= George W. Rice (photographer) =

Canadian photographer (1855–1884)

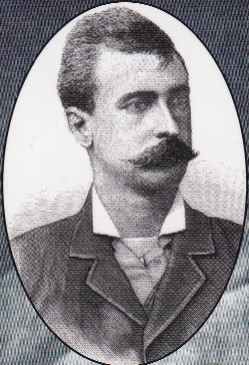
- George Walter Rice circa 1880
- Born: 29 June 1855; Baddeck, Nova Scotia
- Died: 9 April 1884 (aged 28); Cape Sabine, Pim Island, Canadian Arctic
- Known for: photographic pioneer; arctic exploration

George Walter Rice (29 June 1855 – 9 April 1884) was a Canadian photographer who was first to photograph the Arctic region on the ill-fated American led Lady Franklin Bay Expedition of 1881 to 1884. Rice died in the Arctic on 9 April 1884 while awaiting the arrival of a relief vessel.

== Early life and education ==
George W. Rice was born on 29 June 1855, in Baddeck, Nova Scotia, to Joseph Frederick Rice and Mary Ann (Munn) Rice. After attending primary school in Baddeck and secondary school in North Sydney, Nova Scotia, he enrolled in Columbia University Law School in New York but never completed his law degree. He learned the trade of photography from his father who operated a photographic studio in Bridgetown, Nova Scotia, and his two uncles who were well-regarded photographers; Amos Ingraham Rice had a studio in Nova Scotia and Moses Parker Rice had a studio in Washington, DC. Rice gained experience as an arctic photographer on the 1880 Howgate Expedition to explore Greenland.

== Lady Franklin Bay Expedition 1881–1884 ==
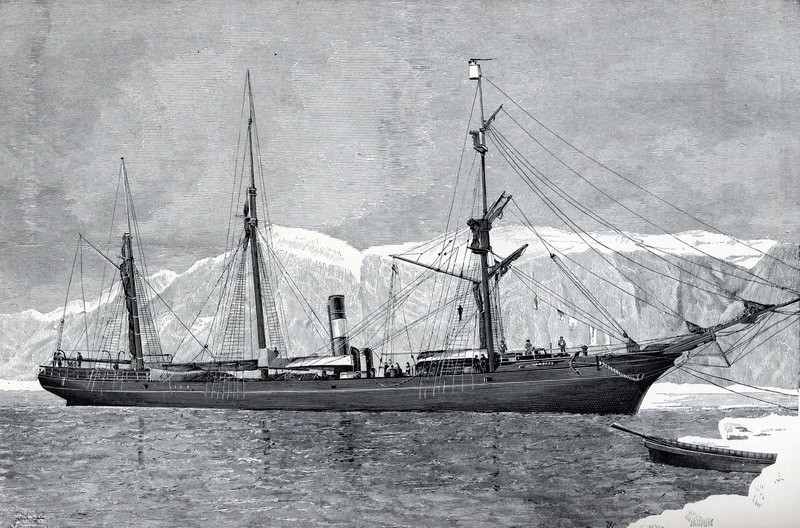
Steamer Proteus in Arctic 1881

George Rice was selected by expedition leader Adolphus Greely as the photographer for a planned expedition to the Arctic Ocean in 1881 after learning of his skill as a photographer in Washington DC. The expedition to Lady Franklin Bay on Ellesmere Island and points north was sponsored by the United States Army Signal Corps, so Rice, a civilian and the only Canadian on the expedition, was given the rank of sergeant. Rice was also on assignment to write about and photograph the expedition for the New York Herald, whose publisher had financed the missing Jeannette expedition and hoped they might find sign of it.

The Lady Franklin Bay Expedition left St. John's, Newfoundland, on 7 July 1881 with a crew of 22 aboard the Proteus, a steam whaler. After picking up 2 Inuit dog sled drivers in Godhavn Greenland, base camp for the expedition was established as Fort Conger on the northern shore of Lady Franklin Bay during late summer 1881. The Proteus returned to home port while the expedition over-wintered, explored, and mapped the region. A relief expedition was expected in the summer of 1882 but the planned relief attempt aboard the steamer Neptune failed. Another relief effort was attempted in the summer of 1883 by the Proteus, but after the Proteus was sunk by ice floes, the expedition remained stranded.

In mid-summer 1883, Greely ordered the abandonment of Fort Conger, and on 9 August 1883 the expedition packed only essential provisions into small boats in an attempt to evacuate to Littleton Island along the Greenland coast of Baffin Bay where sea rescue was more likely. They fell short of Littleton Island, only reaching Pim Island in Smith Sound before onset of winter, and their food supplies became depleted. Rice died on 9 April 1884 near Cape Sabine while hunting seal, polar bear and other arctic animals as food for the remaining survivors. The relief expedition aboard the steam vessels Bear, Thetis, Alert, and the clipper Loch Garry reached Greely and six other survivors at Pim Island on 22 June 1884. Efforts by Rice were credited by Greely for saving the lives of the few who did survive the ordeal.

== Genealogy ==
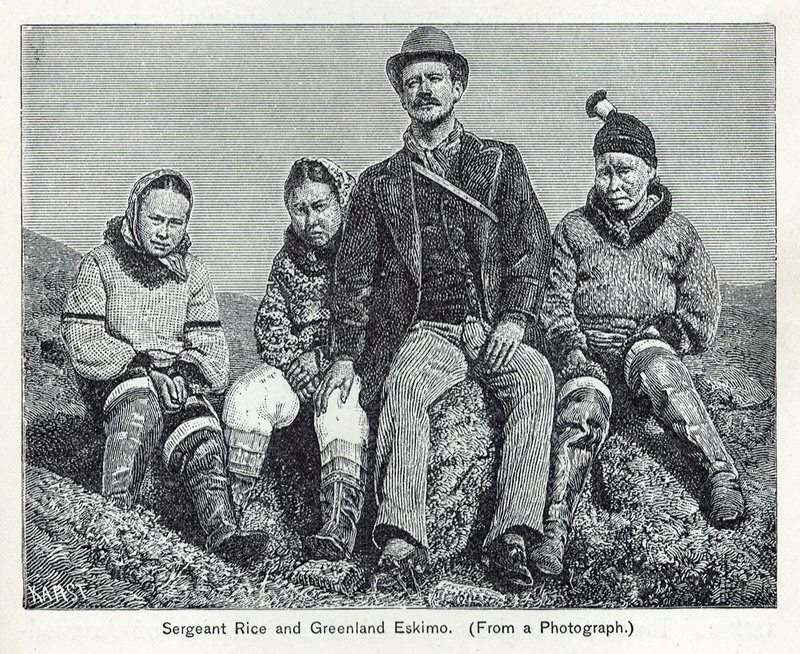
George W. Rice in Greenland in 1881

Rice was a direct descendant of Edmund Rice, an early English immigrant to Massachusetts Bay Colony, as follows:

- George Walter Rice, son of

- Joseph Frederick Rice (1831 – ?), son of
- Robert Muckford Rice (1805 – 1892), son of

- Beriah Rice Jr (1747 – 1818), son of
- Beriah Rice (1702 – 1764), son of

- Thomas Rice (1654 – 1747), son of
- Thomas Rice (1626 – 1681), son of

- Edmund Rice (1594 – 1663)
