= Rice Strait =

Narrow waterway between Ellesmere Island and Pim Island in Nunavut, Canada

Coordinates: 78°43′N 074°43′W

Rice Strait is a narrow waterway between Ellesmere Island's eastern coast and Pim Island in northern Canada's territory of Nunavut. It connects Rosse Bay on the south with Buchanan Bay to the north.

The strait is named after Sergeant George W. Rice (born 29 June 1855 in Baddeck, Nova Scotia), the photographer on Adolphus Greely's ill-fated Lady Franklin Bay Expedition, and a correspondent with the New York Herald. He was the only Canadian on this United States Army Signal Corps sponsored expedition to the Arctic. Rice died on 9 April 1884, before the expedition's rescue.
