= Cocked Hat Island =

Island in Canada

- Location within Nunavut Location within Canada

Geography
- Location: Northern Canada
- Coordinates: 78°47′N 074°34′W
- Archipelago: Queen Elizabeth Islands; Arctic Archipelago

Administration
- Canada
- Territory: Nunavut

Demographics
- Population: Uninhabited

Cocked Hat Island, located off the eastern coast of Ellesmere Island, is a part of the Qikiqtaaluk Region of the Canadian territory of Nunavut. The island is located within the Arctic Archipelago, and is a part of the Queen Elizabeth Islands.

Cocked Hat Island, shaped like a cocked hat, is located 6 km (3.7 mi) north northwest from Pim Island.

== History ==
Adolphus Greely's Lady Franklin Bay Expedition tried to land on Cocked Hat Island in 1883 after spending two months moving southward from their Fort Conger site. Because of ice and wind, they were pushed to Cape Sabine 6 km (3.7 mi) further south on nearby Pim Island.
