= USS Thetis (1881) =

Gunboat of the United States Navy

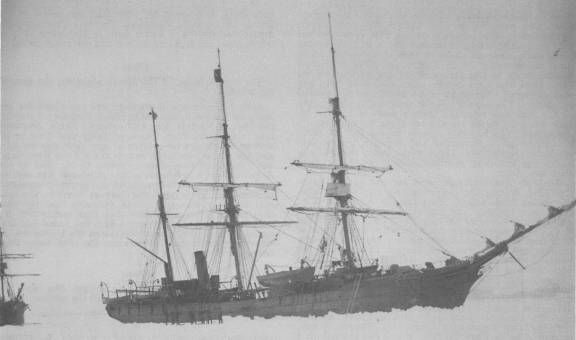
- Thetis (center) with Bear (left) in ice in 1884 during their search for the Greely Expedition.

History

United States
- Name: Thetis
- Builder: Alexander Stephen & Sons
- Launched: 1881
- Acquired: 2 February 1884
- Decommissioned: 30 April 1916
- Fate: Abandoned 1960

General characteristics
- Displacement: 1,250 long tons (1,270 t)
- Length: 188 ft 6 in (57.45 m)
- Beam: 29 ft (8.8 m)
- Draft: 17 ft 10 in (5.44 m)
- Armament: 1 × howitzer

The first USS Thetis was a three-masted, wooden-hulled steam whaler in the United States Navy used to rescue a polar expedition and later in the Revenue Cutter Service.

Thetis was built in 1881 at Dundee, Scotland, by Alexander Stephen & Sons. She was acquired by the U.S. Navy on 2 February 1884 to be employed by the expedition to relieve the polar exploration party under the command of Lt. Adolphus W. Greely. She sailed from Dundee under the command of Lt. L. L. Reamey and arrived in New York on 23 March 1884.

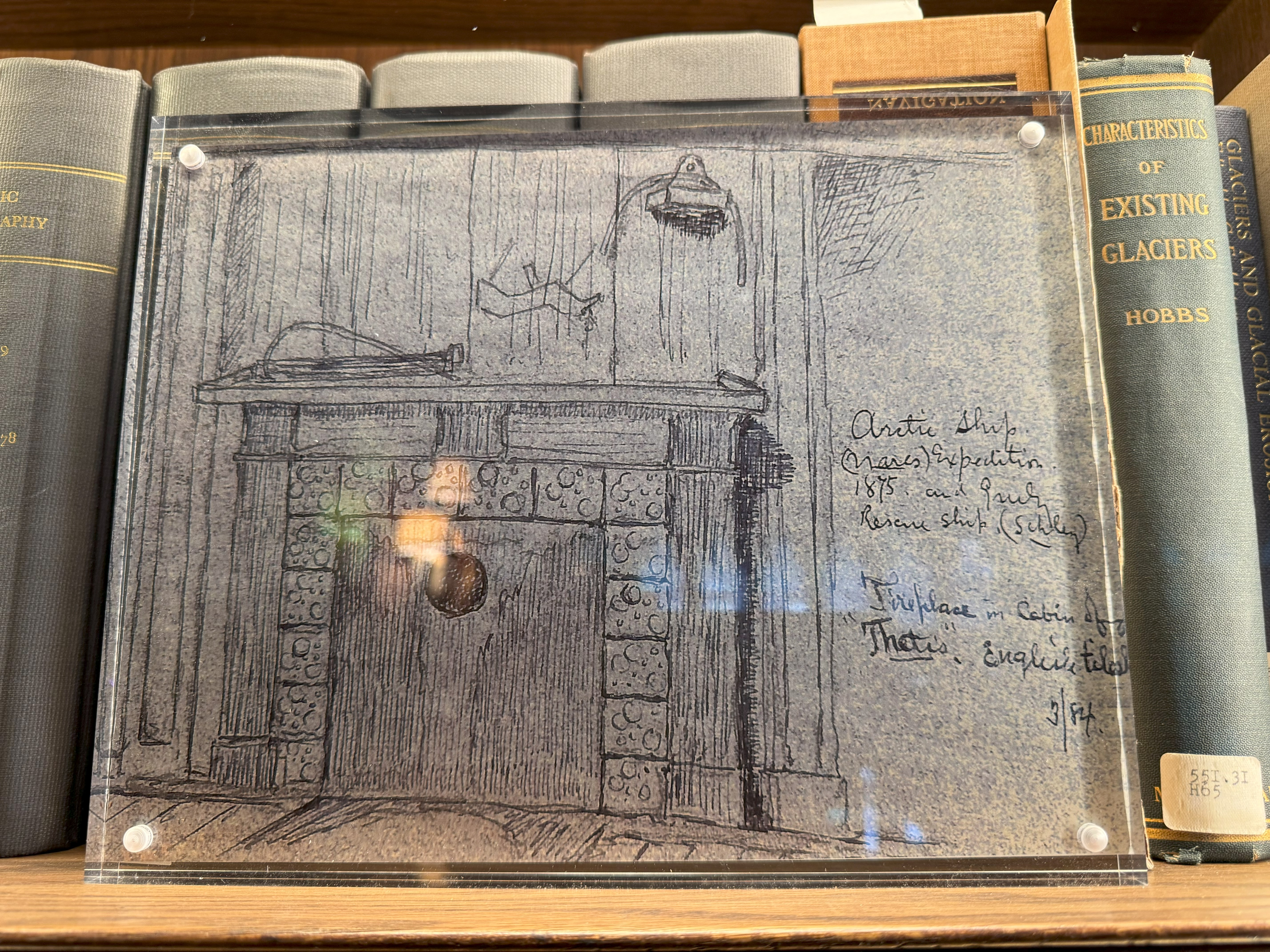
Drawing of the Fireplace on the ship.

== Rescue ==
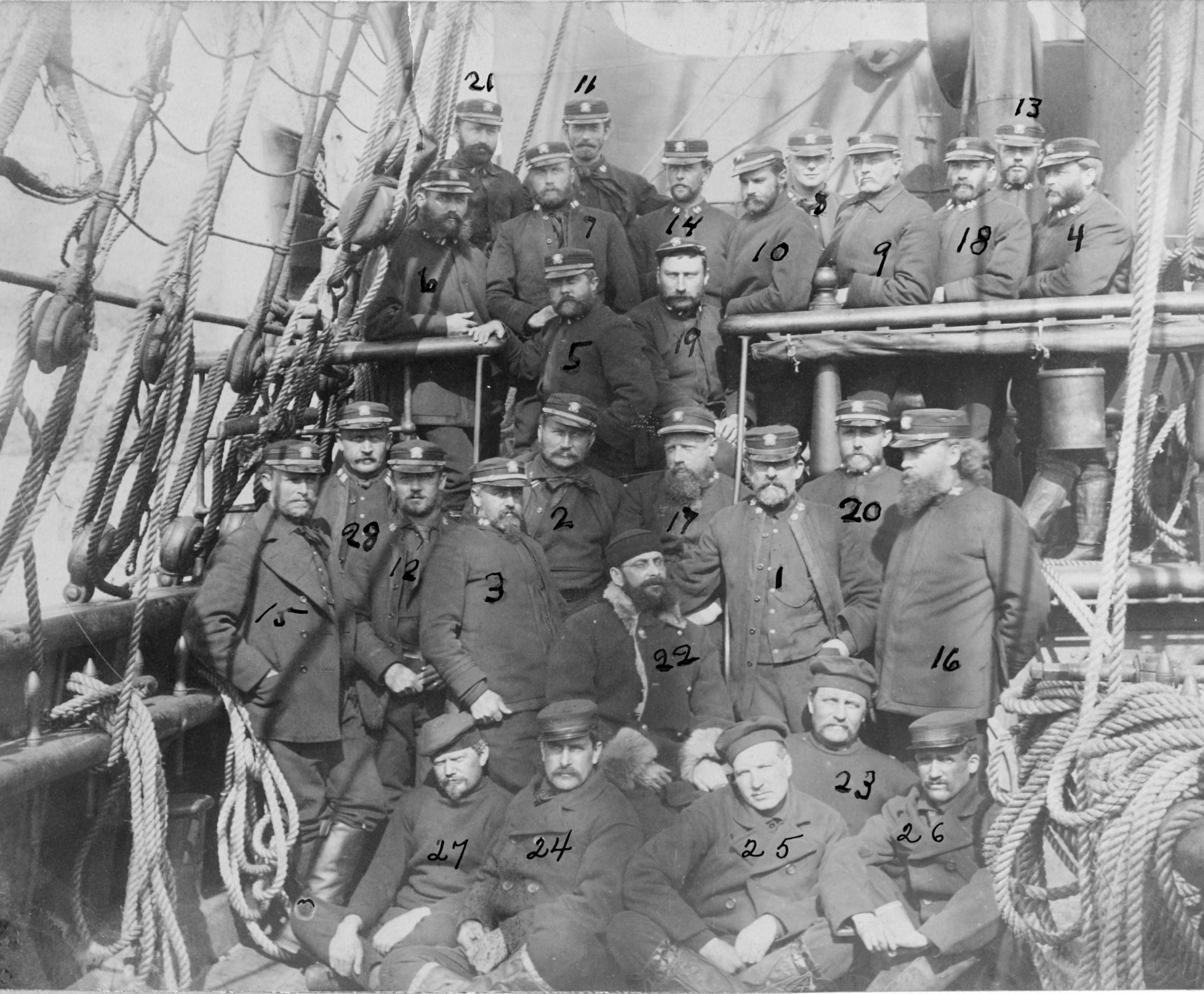
The six survivors of the U.S. Army's Greely Arctic expedition with their U.S. Navy rescuers, at Upernavik, Greenland, 2–3 July 1884. Probably photographed on board Thetis.

After more than a month of preparations, Thetis—now under the command of Commander Winfield Scott Schley, who also headed the relief squadron—departed New York on 1 May. Ice flows and heavy weather hampered the search all along the way. Thetis did not even reach Upernavik, Greenland, her jumping-off point, until the latter part of the month. She departed that port on the 29th in company with Bear and headed north. Along the way, she made stops at the Duck Islands, Cape York, and Littleton Island, arriving at the latter on 21 June. At Littleton Island, her search parties found evidence that Lt. Greely's expedition had stopped there but moved on. They were on the right track. The next day, she moved on to Payer's Harbor and landed search parties on Brevoort Island. More evidence that Greely's party had passed that way also indicated the dire straits in which the expedition found itself. Later that day, the two ships rounded Cape Sabine and, while fighting a howling gale, found Lt. Greely and six companions-alive, but weak from exposure and malnutrition. The other 20 members of the expedition had perished. The following day, the two ships headed south with their precious cargo. After stops at Upernavik, Godhavn, and St. John's, the relief expedition arrived in Portsmouth, N.H., on 1 August. During the five-day stay, rescuers and rescued alike received a tumultuous welcome by the assembled North Atlantic Squadron and enjoyed a warm reception given by the people of Portsmouth. On 6 August, the rescue ships continued south toward New York where they arrived on the 8th. On 20 November 1884, Thetis was placed out of commission and was laid up at New York.

== Pacific service ==
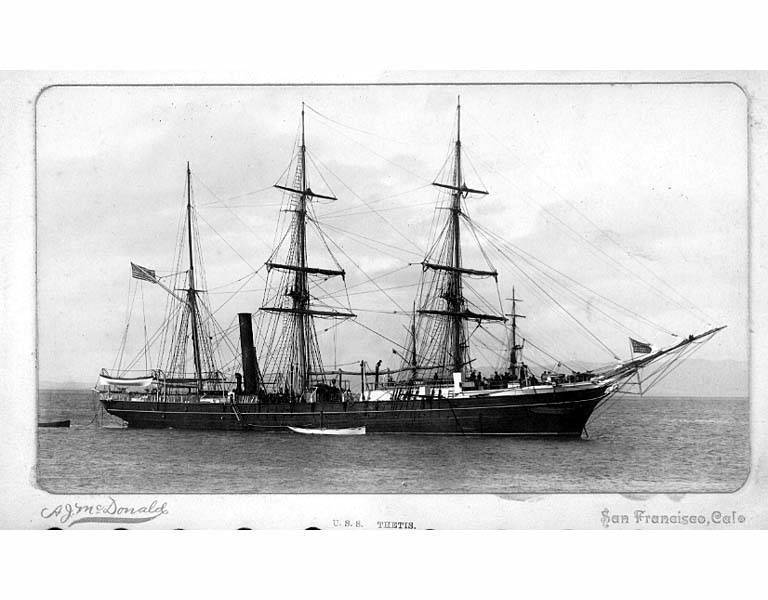
USS Thetis

After more than two years of inactivity, Thetis was recommissioned at New York on 15 January 1887, Lt. William H. Emory Jr., . Between mid January and mid March, the ship was fitted out as a gunboat and prepared for a cruise around Cape Horn to the west coast. She departed New York on 24 March and began an eight-month voyage during which she stopped at Rio de Janeiro, Brazil; Montevideo, Uruguay; Valparaíso, Chile; and Callao, Peru.

On 13 October, Thetis sailed into San Francisco for voyage repairs prior to a brief cruise to Alaskan waters. She departed the Mare Island Navy Yard on 16 November and arrived at Sitka, Alaska, on 4 December. She returned to Mare Island on 9 January 1888 and remained there until 8 April when she embarked upon an extended cruise in Alaskan waters. She returned to Sitka on 18 May and, for the next five months, conducted survey work as far north as Point Barrow, visiting Unalaska, St. Michael, East Cape, and Cape Sabine. On 1 November, she headed south from Sitka and entered San Francisco Bay on the 25th. She spent the following five months at the Mare Island Navy Yard, undergoing repairs and preparing for another Alaska survey assignment. Thetis steamed out from the Golden Gate on 20 April 1889 and shaped a course north to Sitka, where she arrived on 2 June. Another five months of survey work along the Alaskan coast followed, punctuated again with visits to Unalaska and Point Barrow. She returned to San Francisco on 7 December.

Thetis remained at the Mare Island Navy Yard until July 1890, when she sailed for Central America. A revolution had recently broken out in San Salvador, and the insurgents quickly seized power. However, forces of the old government retired to Guatemala which they used as a base for counter-revolutionary operations. This precipitated war between the two countries. By 27 July, Thetis was at San José, Guatemala, beginning a four-month cruise along the coasts of Guatemala and San Salvador to protect American lives and property during the war. During that period, she called several times at La Libertad and Acajulta in San Salvador and at La Union and Amapala, Honduras, in addition to San José, Guatemala. By October, conditions in Central America had quieted sufficiently to allow Thetis to return to San Francisco, where she arrived on the 27th. Two days later, she reentered the Mare Island Navy Yard and remained there until the following June

At mid-month, she departed San Francisco on a four-month assignment in Alaskan waters conducting survey work and patrolling to protect fur seals from poachers. She returned south to San Francisco late in 1891 and remained until the beginning of 1892. In the late spring, she made a brief voyage to the Hawaiian Islands, returning to San Francisco on 18 June. In January 1893, Thetis began survey work along the coast of the Baja California peninsula. For the next four years, she conducted those operations in waters between Magdalena Bay and the southern tip of the California peninsula. She returned periodically to San Diego and San Francisco for repairs and supplies. She concluded that duty in the spring of 1897 and arrived back in San Francisco on 24 April. In July 1897, the ship was placed "in ordinary" at Mare Island.

Although the information above states that Thetis was equipped with one howitzer, a 47 mm (1.85 in) Hotchkiss Revolving Cannon (mislabeled as a "55mm") is on display at Mare Island with an inscription indicating that it came from Thetis.

== Revenue Cutter Service ==
Thetis never again served the Navy. In the spring of 1899, she was transferred temporarily to the United States Revenue Cutter Service for special duty transporting Siberian reindeer to Alaska. This project was instituted through the cooperation of the Revenue Cutter Service and the United States Department of the Interior in an attempt to help Alaskan Natives to learn to herd the animals for food rather than to rely upon hunting for food. Between June and October 1899, she transported 81 reindeer from Siberia to Alaska. In October 1899, she was returned to the Navy briefly but was soon transferred back to the Revenue Cutter Service permanently.

As a commissioned revenue cutter in the Revenue Cutter Service, she spent the next 16 years cruising Alaskan waters on law-enforcement duties and carrying supplies to the frontier fringes. During that time, she was based both at Port Townsend, Washington and San Francisco, California. In the spring of 1904, she made a voyage to the Hawaiian Islands to transport illegal Japanese immigrants from Lisianski Island to Honolulu. In 1908, she rescued 11 members of the crew of the Japanese sealing schooner Satsuma Maru who had been stranded at Point Manby (59°41′30″N 140°18′15″W) on the south-central coast of Alaska below the Malaspina Glacier since their ship's anchor cable had broken during a gale and she had been driven ashore and wrecked there on 5 November 1907. Late in 1909, she returned to Honolulu. From then until the end of her career, she alternated duty in the Hawaiian Islands with annual cruises to Alaskan waters.

The Biological Survey of the United States Department of Agriculture sponsored Thetis on an expedition to the Leeward group of the Hawaiian Islands in 1912–13.

The USRC Thetis visited the French Frigate Shoals in 1912, 1914, 1915, and 1916.

On 27 April 1916, Thetis ended her last voyage in United States Government service at San Francisco. On 30 April 1916, she was placed out of commission. On 3 June 1916, she was sold to W. & S. Job & Co. of New York City. Ironically after years of service on the patrol against seal poachers in the Pacific, she was converted into a sealer herself and operated out of Newfoundland for the next 34 years. In 1950(possibly 1936), her hulk was purposely grounded just outside of St. John's, Newfoundland in Freshwater Bay where few remnants remain.
