= Henry Hayes Lockwood =

American soldier and academic (1814–1899)

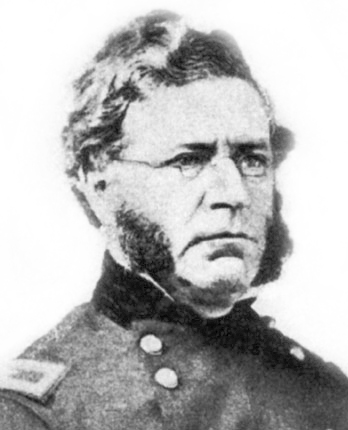
- Lockwood, c. 1861–1865
- Born: August 17, 1814; Kent County, Delaware, U.S.
- Died: December 7, 1899 (aged 85); Georgetown, Washington, D.C., U.S.
- Burial place: United States Naval Academy Cemetery, Annapolis, Maryland
- Spouse: Anna Rogers Booth
- Children: 8
- Military career
- Allegiance: United States of America; Union
- Branch: United States Army; Union Army
- Service years: 1836–1837, 1861–1865
- Rank: Brigadier General
- Commands: 1st Delaware Infantry; Lockwood's Brigade; Middle Department
- Conflicts: Second Seminole War; Mexican-American War; American Civil War
- Other work: Professor; Commander of the U.S. Naval Observatory

Henry Hayes Lockwood (August 17, 1814 – December 7, 1899) was an American soldier and academic from Delaware who rose to the rank of Brigadier General during the American Civil War, captured the Delmarva Peninsula including Virginia's Eastern Shore and headed the Union Middle Department in Baltimore before returning to academic life at the U.S. Naval Academy in Annapolis, Maryland.

== Early and family life ==
Lockwood was born in Camden, Kent County, Delaware on August 17, 1814 to William Kirkley Lockwood (1786–1872) and his wife, the former Mary Hayes (1795–1818). He had a sister, Anne Eliza Lockwood Godwin (1816–1896), but his father did not remarry after his first wife's death while both children were infants. His ancestor Joseph Lockwood had helped the Patriot cause during the American Revolutionary War by serving on a finance commission and as a member of Delaware's state constitutional convention. Lockwood became a cadet at the United States Military Academy at West Point, New York, and graduated in 1836. His father owned three young male slaves in the 1830 census and also lived with a free colored woman of between 24 and 35 years old, but ten years later his six-person household included two free black people and one enslaved male between 10 and 23 years old.

Henry Lockwood married Anna Rogers Booth (1820–1894), whose family was even more prominent in Delaware—her father James Booth Jr. was Chief Justice of Delaware from 1841 until his death in 1845. Her paternal grandfather James Booth Sr. had served as Delaware's Secretary of State, then as Chief Justice of the Court of Common Pleas, and her maternal grandfather Daniel Rogers had been Delaware's governor from 1797 to 1799 after his ancestors had emigrated from England to Accomack County, Virginia before settling in the northern end of the Delmarva Peninsula. The Lockwoods would have six daughters and two sons who survived to adulthood, of whom James Booth Lockwood would follow his father's military career, then become an arctic explorer, but die before his parents. In the 1860 U.S. Federal Census, H.H. Lockwood owned one slave, a 55-year-old black female.

== Career ==
After graduating from West Point, Lockwood completed his year of compulsory military service against the Seminoles in Florida. He then resigned his commission on September 12, 1837 and farmed in Delaware. In 1841 Lockwood received an appointment as a professor of mathematics at the U.S. Naval Asylum at Philadelphia, and also served aboard the frigate United States which helped capture Monterey, California in 1842. Lockwood then resumed his teaching career at the naval asylum at Philadelphia and then became a professor teaching natural and experimental philosophy at the U.S. Naval School at Annapolis in 1845. In 1850 the school was reorganized and renamed as the Naval Academy. In 1851 he became a professor of artillery and infantry tactics, as well as professor of astronomy and gunnery. He wrote and published Manual of Naval Batteries (1852) and Exercises in Small Arms and Field Artillery (1852).

== Civil War ==
As the American Civil War began, Lockwood entered the Union Army as colonel of the 1st Regiment Delaware Volunteer Infantry. After the disastrous First Battle of Bull Run (in which Lockwood's unit did not participate), President Lincoln feared further trouble from Confederate sympathizers on the Delmarva Peninsula, where Lockwood had grown up and where his family remained prominent. He received a commission as brigadier general of volunteers on August 8, 1861, and was assigned to defend the lower Potomac River. On November 13, 1861 Major General John A. Dix entrusted Lockwood with capturing the Eastern Shore of Virginia, that is Accomack and Northampton Counties at the Delmarva Peninsula's southern tip. By massing troops at Pocomoke City, Maryland and promising Virginia residents that if they provided no resistance, their trade would resume, their lighthouses would once again be lit, and their property protected, Lockwood caused the local Confederate forces to retreat and disperse without a fight. Allowing the rebels time to retreat proved another key to Lockwood's pacification strategy.

On July 23, 1862, Lockwood commandeered the Cessford estate at Eastville, Virginia (the former residence of the physician serving the Confederate defenders) for his headquarters. He used it intermittently throughout the war as he led the Union defenses at Point Lookout, Maryland (where the Potomac River enters Chesapeake Bay) and southward on the Delmarva Peninsula. Lockwood thus protected the crucial telegraph line from Hampton Roads across the Delmarva Peninsula to Annapolis, Baltimore and Washington. Gen. Lockwood commanded a brigade attached to XII Corps at the Battle of Gettysburg in July 1863. His brigade was kept directly under corps headquarters control during the battle, because the acting corps commander, Brig. Gen. Alpheus S. Williams, did not want an unknown officer commanding 1st Division just because he was senior to Brig. Gen. Thomas H. Ruger. The brigade was absorbed into the division after Williams returned to that command and Maj. Gen. Henry W. Slocum resumed corps command.

In the winter of 1863–64 Lockwood commanded the Middle Department, with headquarters at Baltimore, Maryland.

During the Battle of Spotsylvania Courthouse General John C. Robinson was severely wounded leading the 2nd Division of the V Corps. The division was ultimately broken up and dispersed among other division commanders for the remainder of the battle. The division was resembled and Lockwood was assigned to command on May 29 during the Battle of Totopotomoy Creek. On June 2, the Pennsylvania Reserves of the 3rd Division were mustered out. All remaining soldiers of that division, along with General Samuel W. Crawford were assigned to the 2nd Division. Corps commander, Maj. Gen. Gouverneur K. Warren, sent the former academic back to the Middle Department because he did not think Lockwood sufficiently competent for so high a rank.

Later he commanded provisional troops against General Jubal A. Early during his raid of July 1864.

== Postbellum career ==
After the war, Lockwood was mustered out on August 25, 1865 and resumed teaching at the U.S. Naval Academy. He commanded the U.S. Naval Observatory from 1870 to 1876, and retired from service on August 4, 1876. His son James Booth Lockwood, who had been born at the Naval Academy but privately educated, had been commissioned a 2nd lieutenant in the 23rd Infantry in 1873, and spent the following seven years in not only military duties but also surveying, telegraphy and phonography west of the Mississippi River with the U.S. Army Signal Corps. He volunteered for the Lady Franklin Bay Expedition into the Arctic for the first International Polar Year, but was not among the seven survivors after rescue parties failed.

== Death and legacy ==
General Lockwood died in Washington D.C.'s Georgetown neighborhood in 1899. He was buried at the U.S. Naval Academy Cemetery in Annapolis, Maryland.

== See also ==
- List of American Civil War generals (Union)
