= Farthest North =

Most northerly latitude reached by explorers before the conquest of the North Pole

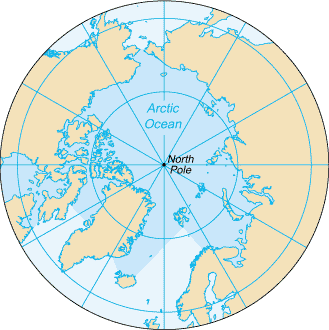
The North Pole, at the center of the Arctic Ocean. The inner circle shows 75° N.

Farthest North describes the most northerly latitude reached by explorers, before the first successful expedition to the North Pole rendered the expression obsolete. The Arctic polar regions are much more accessible than those of the Antarctic, as continental land masses extend to high latitudes and sea voyages to the regions are relatively short.

== Early voyages ==
The most northerly point of mainland Europe, Knivskjellodden in Norway, lies at 71° 11' N. War and trade had led to voyages between western Norway and Northern Russia around Knivskjellodden and the North Cape since at least the 15th Century. John Davis on his third voyage to seek the Northwest Passage in 1587 sailed up the Strait that bears his name, between Greenland and Baffin Island, to a latitude of 72° 12' N. A Dutch expedition led by Willem Barentz, attempting the Northeast Passage reached 79° 49’N on 16 June 1596, on the NW coast of Spitsbergen. In 1607, Henry Hudson probably reached Hakluyt's Headland (a little south of the latitude reached by Barentz), but could not proceed further as ice lay packed along Spitsbergen's north coast. In 1612, an explorer from Hull, Thomas Marmaduke, claimed to have reached 82°N, while Dutch explorers in 1614 and 1624 claimed to have sailed even further north to 83°N.

These latter claims lack basis in fact, with the second, made by Joris Carolus, impossible knowing ice conditions that season; although Marmaduke did at least reach Gråhuken, at 79° 48′N. English whalers reached Svalbard's Nordkapp at 80° 32′N, in or before 1622, as shown on the Muscovy Company's Map of 1625. The Seven Islands, at 80° 49′N, north of Nordaustlandet, were first marked on a Dutch map of 1663, but were allegedly reached by a ship of Enkhuizen as early as 1618.

In 1707, the Dutch whaler Cornelis Giles rounded the northernmost point of Nordaustlandet in Svalbard, passing 81°N. In 1806, the Resolution of Whitby, under William Scoresby, Sr, was said to have sailed north of the Seven Islands and reached 81° 50′N.

== Nineteenth century ==
One of the first expeditions with the explicit purpose of reaching the North Pole was that of Sir William Edward Parry in 1827, who reached 82° 45′N, a record that stood for decades. Sir Albert Hastings Markham, a member of the British Arctic Expedition of 1875 was the next one to get closer to the pole 48 years later, when he reached a latitude of 83° 20′26″N by a dog sledge. Adolphus Greely's Lady Franklin Bay Expedition bested Markham by a few miles, reaching 83° 24′N in 1882.

In 1895, Norwegians Fridtjof Nansen and Fredrik Hjalmar Johansen reached latitude 86° 14′N. In 1900, Umberto Cagni of the Italian Royal Navy left the base camp established by Luigi Amedeo, Duke of the Abruzzi, and reached latitude 86° 34′N on April 25, beating Nansen's 1895 mark by 35 to 40 kilometres (22 to 25 mi).

== Cook and Peary ==
Two American explorers claimed to reach the North Pole; Frederick Cook in 1908 and Robert Peary in 1909. Cook's claim was soon judged to be fraudulent, and Peary was credited as the discoverer of the North Pole for much of the 20th century. In recent decades, however, Peary's claim has become the subject of controversy, though he did set a new record for Farthest North – his support party was dismissed at 87° 45′N. With Peary's claim accepted at the time, overland expeditions to the North Pole came to an end.

Roald Amundsen of Norway redirected his planned Arctic expedition and instead aimed for the South Pole, which he achieved in 1911.

== Wilkins–Ellsworth expedition ==
In 1931, an expedition led by Sir Hubert Wilkins and Lincoln Ellsworth and partly financed by William Randolph Hearst attempted to reach the North Pole with a leased US Navy submarine named Nautilus, formerly the USS O-12. The Nautilus was modified for under ice operations by submarine designer Simon Lake so it could detect openings (or, if necessary, drill them) in the ice pack and surface to recharge her batteries. While the expedition was a failure, the Nautilus did reach a latitude of 82 degrees north. In accordance with the lease agreement, the Nautilus was scuttled after the expedition to prevent her reuse as a warship.

== Conquest ==
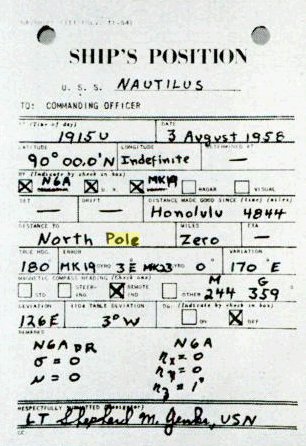
Navigator's report: Nautilus, 90° 00.0′N, 3 August 1958

On 9 May 1926, Richard Evelyn Byrd attempted to fly over the North Pole in an airplane. He was widely credited with achieving this, but his claim subsequently became subject to doubt.

Finally, on 12 May 1926, the airship Norge carried Roald Amundsen and fifteen other men including the craft's designer and pilot Umberto Nobile, helmsman Oscar Wisting, navigator Hjalmar Riiser-Larsen, and the expedition's sponsor, Lincoln Ellsworth, over the North Pole, en route from Spitsbergen to Alaska, the first achievement of the Pole about which there is no controversy.

The first person definitely to set foot on the Pole was the Russian Alexander Kuznetsov, who landed an aircraft there in 1948.

On 3 August 1958, a US Navy submarine, also named USS Nautilus, was the first to sail under the ice pack to reach the North Pole. On 17 March 1959, the USS Skate became the first submarine to surface at the North Pole.

Ralph Plaisted and his three companions, Walt Pederson, Gerry Pitzl and Jean-Luc Bombardier, are regarded by most polar authorities to be the first to succeed in a surface traverse by snowmobile across the ice to the North Pole on 20 April 1968, making the first confirmed surface conquest of the Pole before being airlifted out.

On 6 April 1969, British explorer Sir Wally Herbert became the first person to indubitably reach the Pole on foot, having sledged from Alaska. His expedition was supported by air drops.

== See also ==
- Arctic exploration
- Farthest South

== Sources ==
- Berton, P. (1988). The Arctic Grail. New York: Viking. ISBN 9780670824915.
- Conway, M. (2012). No Man's Land. Cambridge: CUP. ISBN 9781107605091.
- Fleming, F. (2001). Ninety Degrees North. London: Granta. ISBN 9781862074491.
- Holland, C. (1999). Farthest North. London: Robinson. ISBN 9781841190990.
- Laing, J. (1818). Voyage to Spitzbergen. Edinburgh: Balfour and Clarke. ISBN 9781841190990.
