= James B. Lockwood =

American army officer and arctic explorer

James Booth Lockwood (October 9, 1852 – April 9, 1884) was a United States Army officer and arctic explorer.

== Biography ==
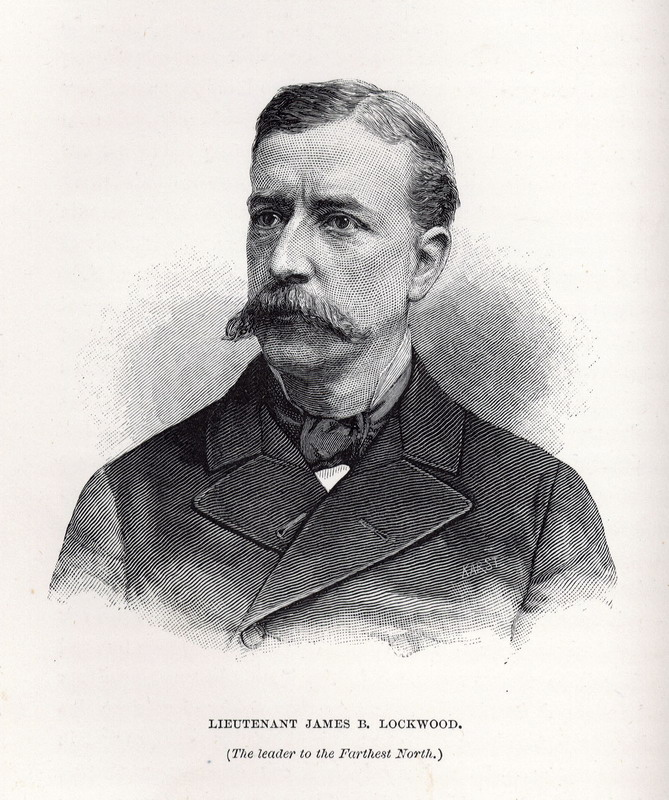

Lockwood was born in Annapolis, Maryland, to Henry Hayes Lockwood and his wife Anna. He attended St. John's College. He was commissioned second lieutenant in the 23rd Infantry of the United States Army in October 1873. He was promoted to first lieutenant in March 1883. In 1881, Lockwood signed up for the Lady Franklin Bay expedition under Adolphus W. Greely, and was accepted as second-in-command.

During this three-year expedition, Lockwood led a sledging party, with David Legge Brainard, to Mary Murray Island, off northern Greenland, at a latitude of 83° 24', thus breaking the British record of the time for the most northerly point reached. In 1883, he crossed Grant Land, reaching the western shore of Ellesmere Island.

He died at Cape Sabine in April 1884, along with several other members of the party, before rescue arrived on June 22, and was buried at the United States Naval Academy Cemetery.

Lockwood Island in northern Greenland was named in his honor.
