= Rutherford Bay =

Bay in Nunavut, Canada

- Location within Nunavut
- Location: Rice Strait
- Coordinates: 78°47′N 74°47′W
- Ocean/sea sources: Arctic Ocean
- Basin countries: Canada
- Settlements: Uninhabited

Rutherford Bay is an Arctic waterway in the Qikiqtaaluk Region, Nunavut, Canada. It is located at the north end of Rice Strait, near the southern entrance of the Kane Basin. Ellesmere Island is to the east.
