= Alexandra Fiord =

Fiord in Nunavut, Canada

Alexandra Fjord
- Location in Nunavut
- Location: Johan Peninsula, Ellesmere Island, Nunavut
- Coordinates: 78°54′N 76°00′W
- Ocean/sea sources: Nares Strait
- Basin countries: Canada

Alexandra Fiord is a natural inlet on the Johan Peninsula of Ellesmere Island in the Qikiqtaaluk Region of Nunavut, Canada. To the east, it opens into Buchanan Bay.

== History ==
Alexandra Fiord has a long and variable history, from the Paleo and Thule cultures that inhabited the fiord from 2500 BCE - 1500 CE, to the scientists that seasonally visit the fiord now. From 1953 to 1963, the Royal Canadian Mounted Police had a station at Alexandra Fjord (78°52′55.2″N 75°48′10.8″W) which, at the time, was the northernmost police station in the world. It was then used as a seasonally scientific research base from 1987 to 1992. It is currently used as a seasonal scientific research base and an online database has been made.
