= David L. Brainard =

American army officer and arctic explorer (1856–1946)

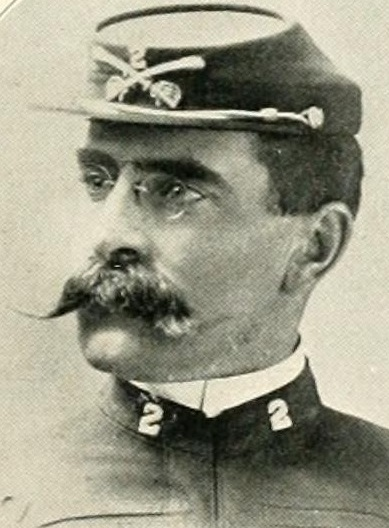
- Brainard as a major in 1902
- Born: David Legge Brainard; December 21, 1856; Norway, New York, U.S.
- Died: March 22, 1946 (aged 89); Washington, D.C., U.S.
- Burial place: Arlington National Cemetery
- Education: State Normal School, Cortland, New York
- Spouse(s): Anna Chase (m. 1888–1893, div.); Sara Hall Guthrie Neff (m. 1917–1946, his death)
- Military career
- Allegiance: United States
- Branch: United States Army
- Service years: 1876–1919
- Rank: Brigadier General
- Service number: 0-13116
- Commands: Chief Commissary, Department of the East; Chief Commissary, Department of California; Chief Commissary, Philippine Division; U.S. Military Attaché, Buenos Aires, Argentina; U.S. Military Attaché, Lisbon, Portugal
- Wars: American Indian Wars; Great Sioux War; Nez Perce War; Bannock War; Spanish–American War; Philippine–American War; World War I
- Awards: Purple Heart; Military Order of Christ (Grand Officer) (Portugal); Military Order of Aviz (Grand Officer) (Portugal); Legion of Honor (Officer) (France)

David Legge Brainard (December 21, 1856 – March 22, 1946) was a career officer in the United States Army. He enlisted in 1876, received his officer's commission in 1886, and served until 1919. Brainard attained the rank of brigadier general and served during World War I as U.S. military attaché in Lisbon, Portugal.

A native of Norway, New York, Brainard was raised and educated in Norway and nearby Freetown, and graduated from the State Normal School in Cortland, New York.

In addition to his First World War service, Brainard was a veteran of the American Indian Wars, Spanish–American War, and Philippine–American War. He was also a noted arctic explorer who attained fame as one of only six survivors of the 1881 to 1884 Lady Franklin Bay Expedition. He was the recipient of several civilian awards in recognition of his explorations. He died in Washington, D.C., on March 22, 1946, and was buried at Arlington National Cemetery.

== Early life ==
Brainard was born in Norway, New York on December 21, 1856, the fifth son of Alanson Brainard and Maria C. Legge. His family moved to a farm in Freetown, New York, when he was ten years old, and Brainard was raised and educated in Norway and Freetown. He attended the State Normal School in Cortland, New York, and then decided upon a military career.

== Military career ==
=== Start of career ===
Brainard enlisted in the United States Army in September 1876. (Note: According to some sources, Brainard attended the 1876 Centennial Exposition in Philadelphia. He was traveling home and discovered while changing trains in New York City that he did not have enough cash to purchase a ticket for the rest of the journey. Rather than ask his family for money, he took the free Army ferry to the recruiting station on Governors Island and signed an enlistment contract. After enlisting, he discovered the ten dollar bill he had previously placed in his shirt pocket, which would have been more than enough to complete his train ride to Freetown.) (Note: In another version of the enlistment story, Brainard was unable to travel beyond New York City because he had been robbed in Philadelphia.) He was assigned to the 2nd Cavalry Regiment and served at Fort Keogh, Montana Territory during the Great Sioux War of 1876. On May 7, 1877, Brainard fought in the Battle of Little Muddy Creek, Montana, where he was wounded in the face and right hand. In August 1877, Brainard was one of four soldiers assigned to escort the Army's commanding general, William Tecumseh Sherman and Sherman's party on an inspection tour of Yellowstone National Park. In 1877 and 1878, he served under Nelson Appleton Miles in Montana during the Nez Perce War and Bannock War. He was promoted to corporal in October 1877, and sergeant in July 1879.

=== Arctic exploration ===
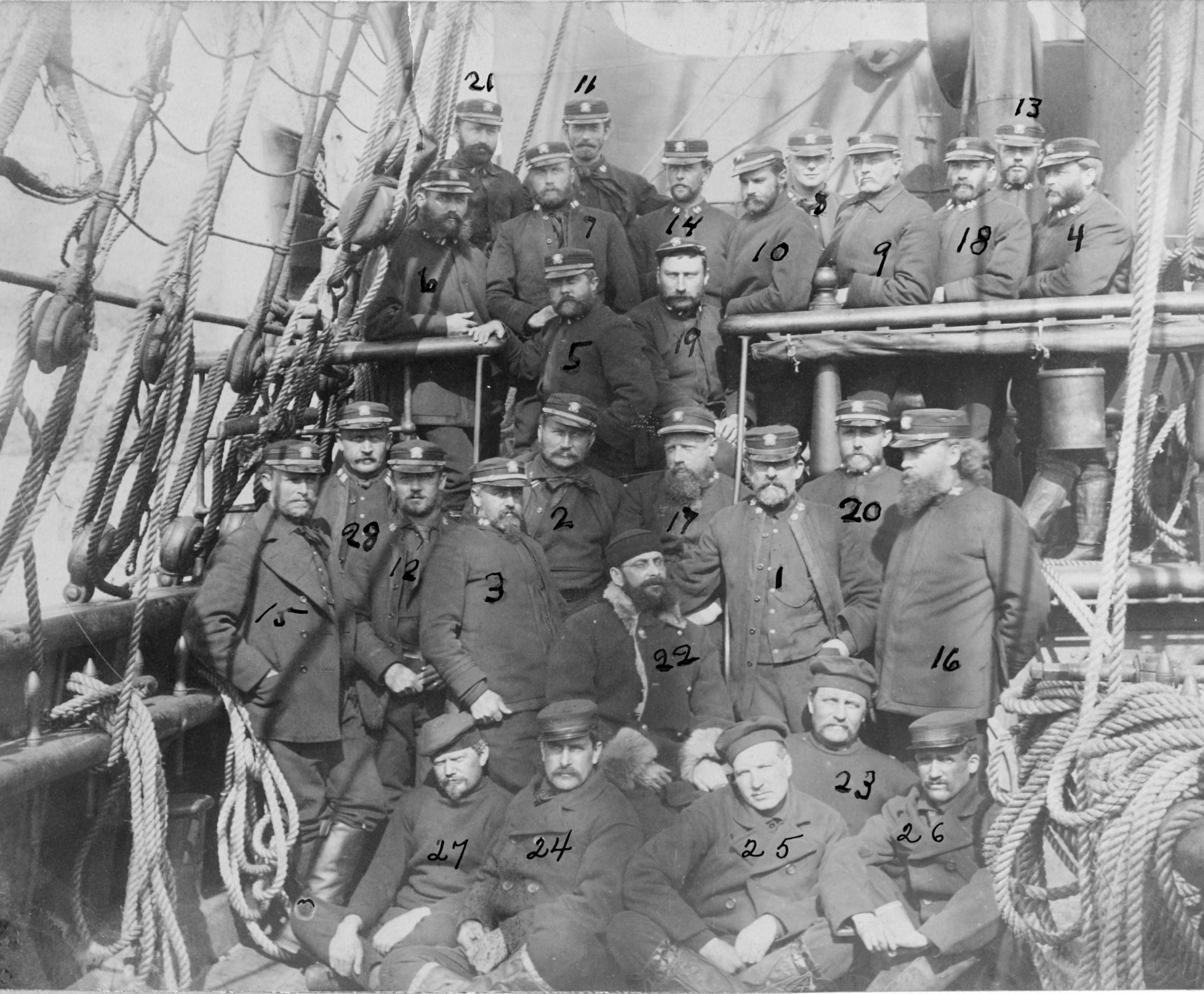
Survivors of the Greely expedition and their rescuers. Brainard is number 24.

In 1880, Brainard was selected for the Howgate expedition, which started for Greenland in July 1880, but turned back after a heavy storm damaged the expedition's ship. In 1881, he was detailed as first sergeant for the Lady Franklin Bay Expedition, which was commanded by Adolphus Greely. Over the three years of this expedition he continuously kept a journal.

Twenty-five men began the expedition, which ran into difficulty when several attempts to resupply it failed, and several rescue attempts were forced to turn back. Among those who died was James Booth Lockwood, second-in-command and Brainard's companion on many excursions, including their record breaking push north to latitude 83° 23' 30". Brainard wrote:

Lieut. Lockwood became unconscious early this morning and at 4:30 pm breathed his last. This will be a sad blow to his family who evidently idolized him. To me it is also a sorrowful event. He had been my companion during long and eventful excursions, and my feeling toward him was akin to that of a brother. Biederbick and myself straightened his limbs and prepared his remains for burial. This was the saddest duty I have ever yet been called upon to perform.

Brainard was later credited with saving as many expedition members as possible by closely rationing the group's limited food. Shortly before the survivors were rescued in the spring of 1884, Brainard, freezing, starving, and suffering from scurvy wrote: "Our own condition is so wretched, so palpably miserable, that death would be welcomed rather than feared ..." Brainard was one of only six survivors rescued by Rear Admiral Winfield Scott Schley on June 22. (Note: Seven men were alive when Schley arrived, but one died soon afterwards.) On that day, he was reportedly near death himself, too weak to hold a pencil so he could make an entry in his log.

=== Later career ===
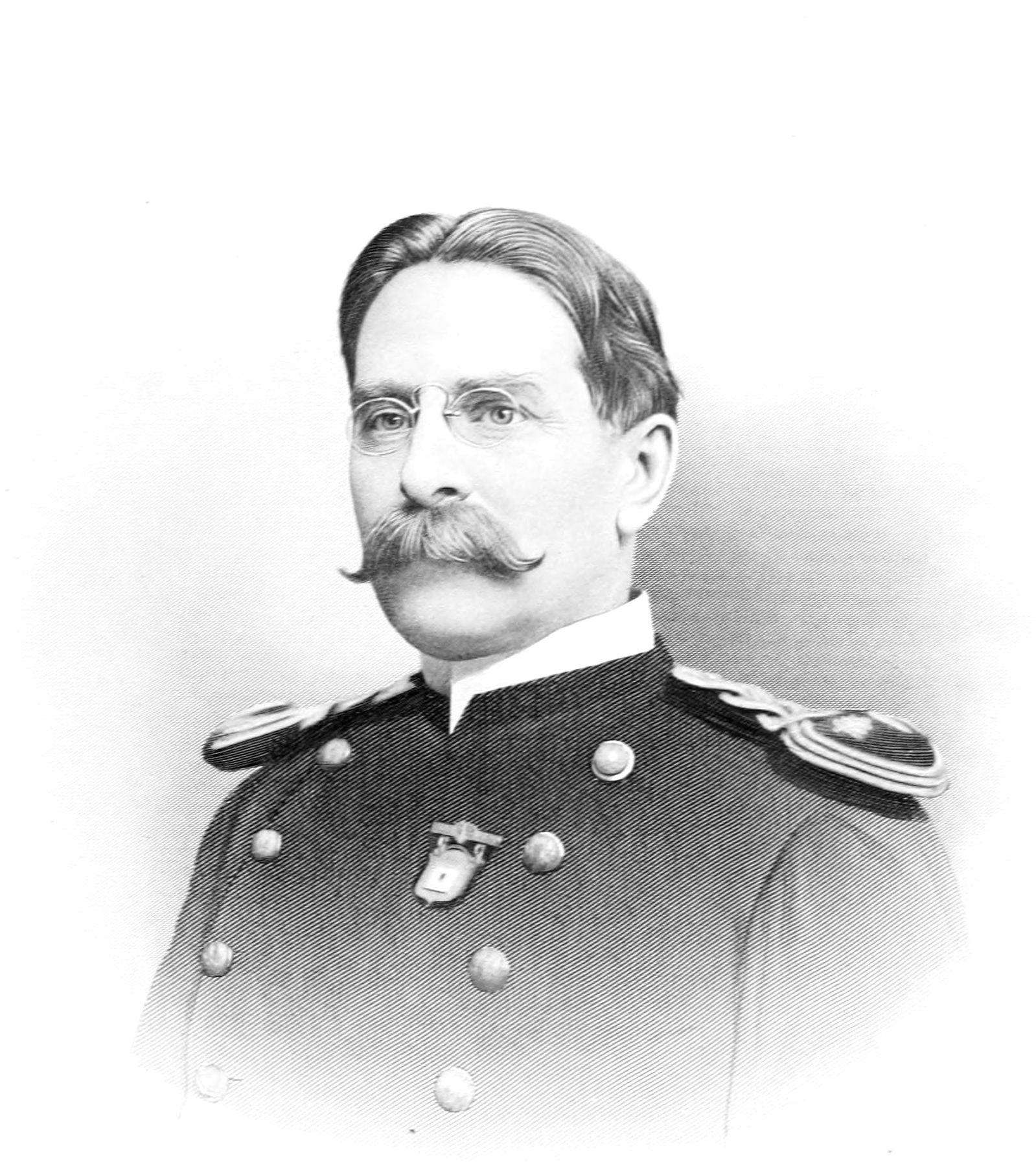
Brainard in 1905

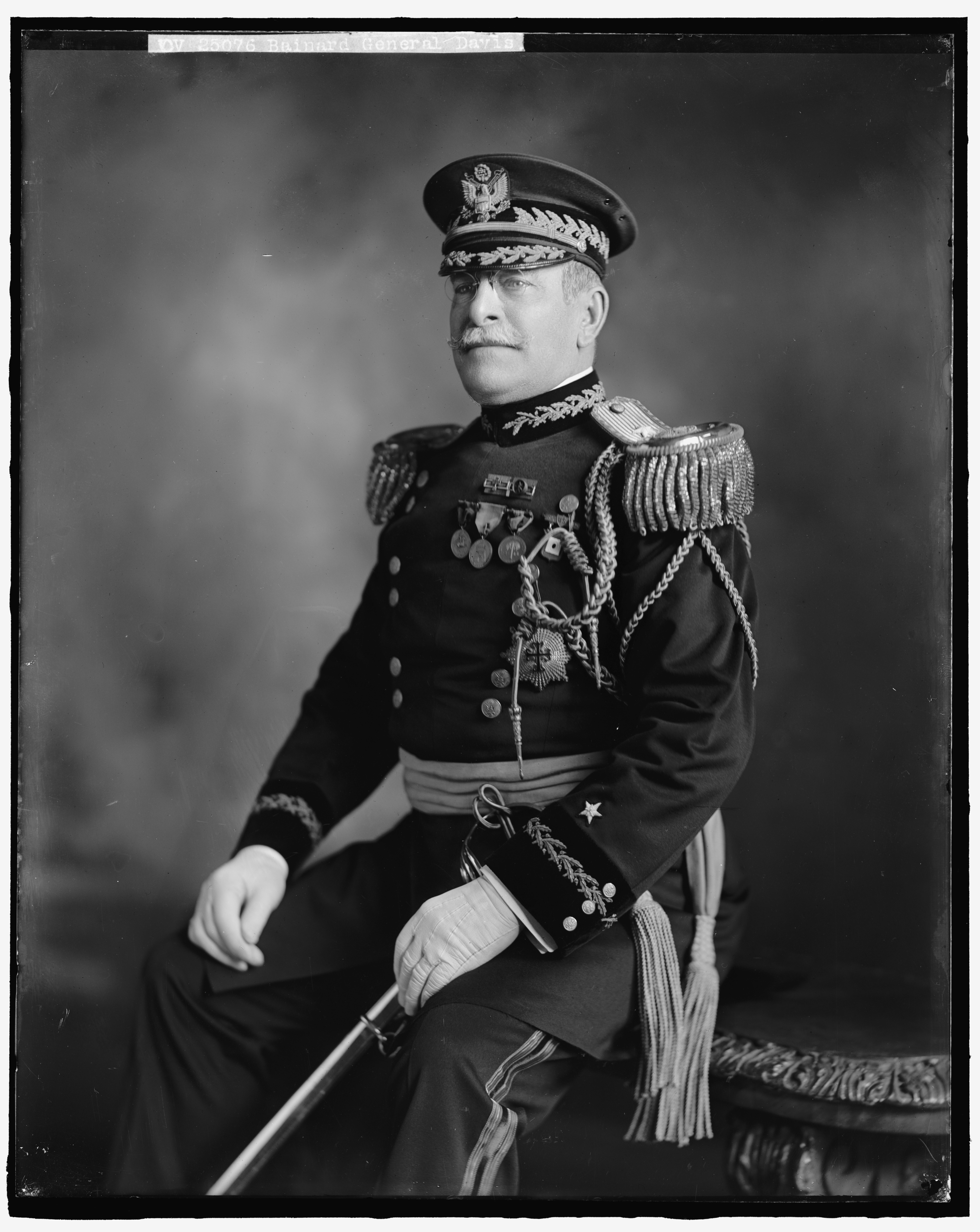
Brainard as a brigadier general, circa 1919

In January 1885, Brainard sought a commission in the 10th Infantry Regiment, but the appointment went to Andre W. Brewster. In 1886, he was commissioned a second lieutenant in the 2nd Cavalry "as recognition of the gallant and meritorious services rendered by him in the Arctic expedition of 1881–1884." He then had the distinction of being the only living US Army officer, active or retired, who had been commissioned as a commendation for specific services.

Brainard was promoted to first lieutenant in August 1893. In October 1896 he transferred to the Subsistence Department and received promotion to captain. In December 1897, he participated in the Yukon Relief Mission, which provided emergency assistance to Klondike Gold Rush miners who were experiencing shortages of food.

In May 1898, Brainard was promoted to temporary lieutenant colonel and he served as chief commissary of the military forces in the Philippines during the Spanish–American War in 1898 and Philippine–American War in 1899. In May 1900, he was promoted to permanent major. His subsequent assignments included chief commissary of the Department of the East, Department of California, and Philippine Division. In 1905, Brainard received promotion to permanent lieutenant colonel. Brainard was a charter member of The Explorers Club and served its president from 1912 to 1913. He was promoted to colonel in June 1912.

In 1914, Brainard was assigned as U.S. military attaché in Buenos Aires, Argentina. In October 1917, Brainard received promotion to temporary brigadier general. During World War I, he served as military attaché in Lisbon, Portugal, and he retired as a brigadier general in October 1919.

== Family ==
Brainard married Anna Chase in 1888, and they divorced in 1893. In 1917, he married Sara Hall Guthrie (1880–1953). Brainard had no children and was the stepfather of his second wife's daughter Elinor.

== Retirement and death ==
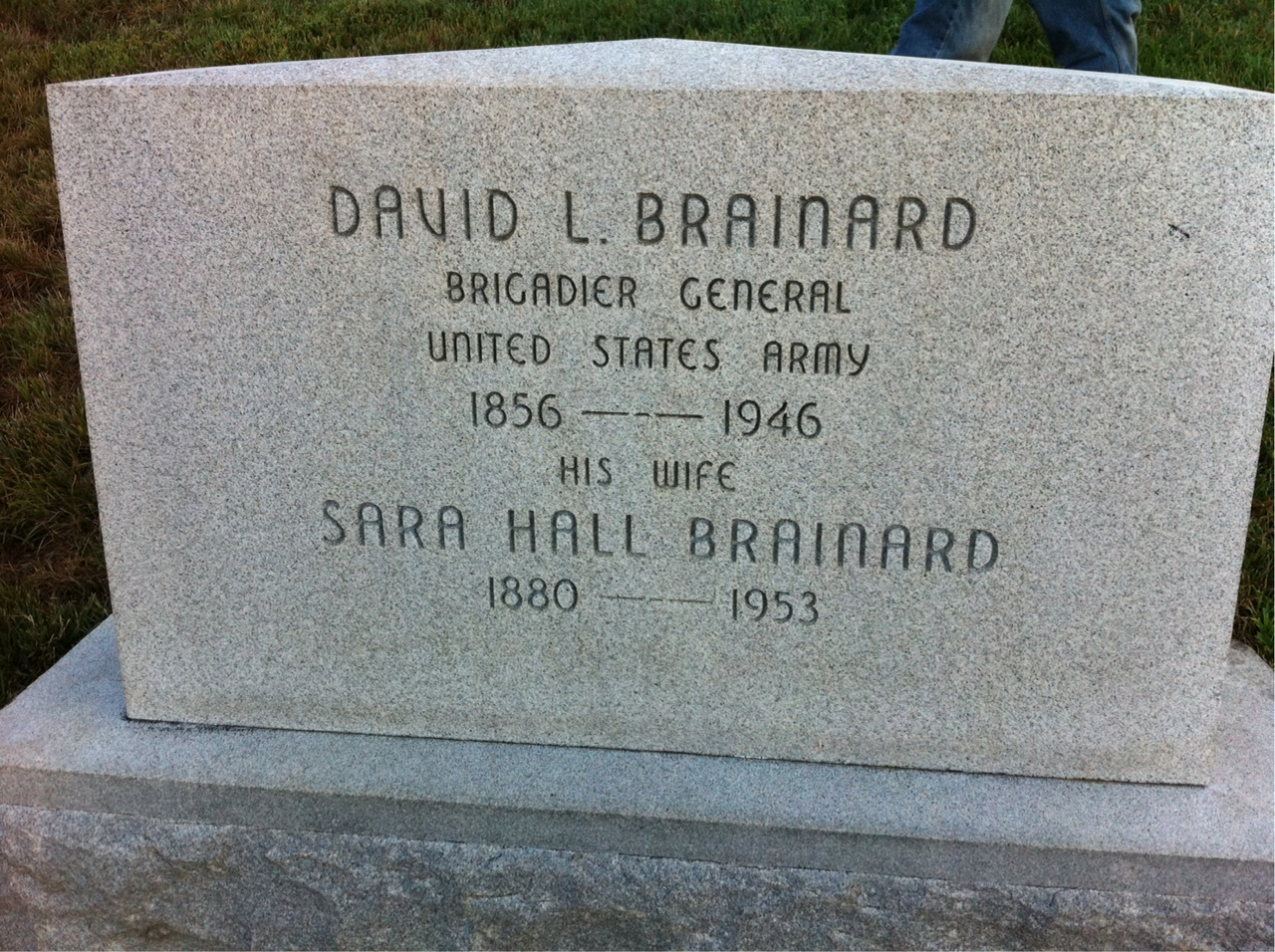
Brainard's gravestone at Arlington National Cemetery

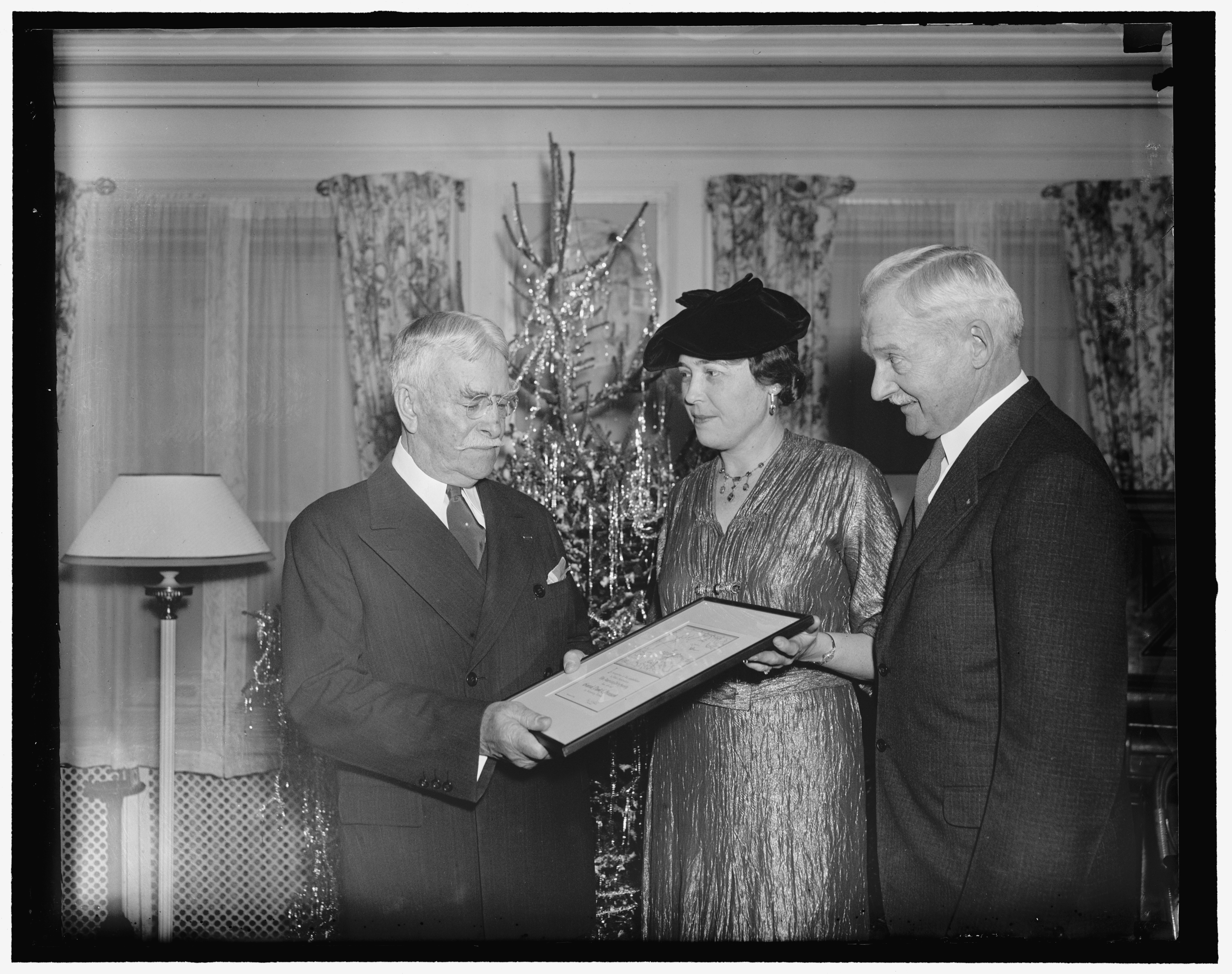
Brainard receiving his honorary membership in the American Polar Society in 1936

After leaving the Army, Brainard was appointed vice president of the Association of Army and Navy Stores, and was named to the association's board of directors. He remained active in these roles until his death.

He was elected an honorary member of the American Polar Society in 1936, on his 80th birthday. He was a Freemason, and belonged to Marathon Lodge No. 438 in Marathon, New York.

Brainard died at Walter Reed Army Medical Center in Washington, D.C. on March 22, 1946. He was buried at Arlington National Cemetery. He was the last survivor of the Greely Arctic Expedition.

== Awards ==
=== Military awards ===
Brainard as a colonel circa 1913, with several of his awards displayed on his dress uniform

The Purple Heart medal was created in 1932. On January 27, 1933, Brainard received the award for wounds he sustained at the Battle of Little Muddy Creek on May 7, 1877. His was one of only two Purple Hearts known to have been awarded for the American Indian Wars, because posthumous awards were not authorized and eligible individuals had to proactively submit applications.

In addition to the Purple Heart, Brainard's military awards and decorations included:

- Purple Heart
- Indian Campaign Medal
- Spanish Campaign Medal
- Philippine Campaign Medal
- World War I Victory Medal
- Military Order of Christ (Grand Officer) (Portugal)
- Military Order of Aviz (Grand Officer) (Portugal)
- Legion of Honor (Officer) (France)

=== Civilian awards ===
In addition to his military awards, Brainard received the Royal Geographical Society's Back Award in 1886. He was a fellow of the American Geographical Society, and his arctic explorations resulted in award of the society's Charles P. Daly Medal in 1926. He was also a 1929 recipient of the civilian Explorers Club Medal.

Brainard was also inducted into the Cortland County Hall of Fame. The hall is maintained by the Homeville Museum in Cortland, and recognizes significant county residents in eras from pre-1850 to 1975-current.

== Publications ==
- The Outpost of the Lost. Indianapolis: Bobbs-Merrill Company. 1929. OCLC 2027965.
- Six Came Back. Indianapolis: Bobbs-Merrill Company. 1940. OCLC 2168015.

== Bibliography ==
- Davis, Henry Blaine Jr. (1998). Generals in Khaki. Raleigh: Pentland Press. ISBN 978-1-5719-7088-6.
