= Edward Israel =

- Edward Israel prior to the expedition
- Born: July 1, 1859; Kalamazoo, Michigan, U.S.
- Died: May 27, 1884 (aged 24); Cape Sabine, Northwest Territories, Canada
- Education: University of Michigan
- Known for: Astronomer for the Greely Arctic expedition
- Scientific career
- Fields: Astronomy

Edward Israel (July 1, 1859 – May 27, 1884) was an astronomer and polar explorer.

== Early years ==
Israel was born in Kalamazoo, Michigan on July 1, 1859. He was the son of Mannes and Tillie Israel, the first Jews to settle in Kalamazoo. After graduating from the Kalamazoo Public School System, Israel went to the University of Michigan, where he studied astronomy.

Just before his graduation in 1881, one of Israel's professors nominated him to serve as the astronomer on an official US expedition to the Arctic. After graduation, Israel briefly returned to Kalamazoo to visit his family.

== Polar expedition ==
Israel left for Washington, D.C., on April 28, 1881, to join the Lady Franklin Bay Polar Expedition with 23 other men under the leadership of Adolphus Greely. The Lady Franklin Bay Expedition was commissioned by the US government to collect scientific information about the polar regions. Israel received the assignment of collecting astronomical, magnetic and meteorological data.

The ill-fated expedition left Washington on June 9, 1881, reaching Newfoundland later in the month. From there, the crew boarded a special polar-equipped ship and went to Lady Franklin Bay, to a site far above the Arctic Circle. Israel and the rest of the crew spent two years at a camp they called Fort Conger.

In 1882, the annual supply ship did not arrive, and by August 1883, the expedition ran out of supplies. They took off trying to find the ship, guided only by Israel's astronomical data. When the expedition reached Cape Sabine, it was found that their supply ship had hit ice and sunk.

The expedition members had to struggle through the winter of 1883 with virtually no supplies. Three weeks before the crew of the expedition was rescued by the US Navy, Israel died. Too weak and ill to bury Israel (or other dead expedition members), the remaining members of the crew returned Israel's body to Kalamazoo on August 11, 1884.

== Burial place ==
Edward Israel was given full honors from the city of Kalamazoo upon the return of his body. His body is buried in the Jewish cemetery next to Mountain Home Cemetery. In 1972, the state of Michigan erected an historical marker commemorating Israel at the site of his grave.
