= Johan Peninsula =

Peninsula in Nunavut, Canada

Coordinates: 78°40′N 076°00′W

The Johan Peninsula is located on the eastern coast of Ellesmere Island, a part of the Qikiqtaaluk Region of the Canadian territory of Nunavut. It stretches eastward into Nares Strait. Buchanan Bay is to the north, Rosse Bay to the east (separating the peninsula from Pim Island), and Baird Inlet lies to the south.

There are several glaciers surrounding the peninsula, including Leffert Glacier, Jewell Glacier, Saate Glacier, Fram Glacier, Twin Glacier, Alfred Newton Glacier, MacMillan Glacier, Allen Glacier, Green Glacier, and Small Glacier.
