= Lady Franklin Bay Expedition =

Polar expedition

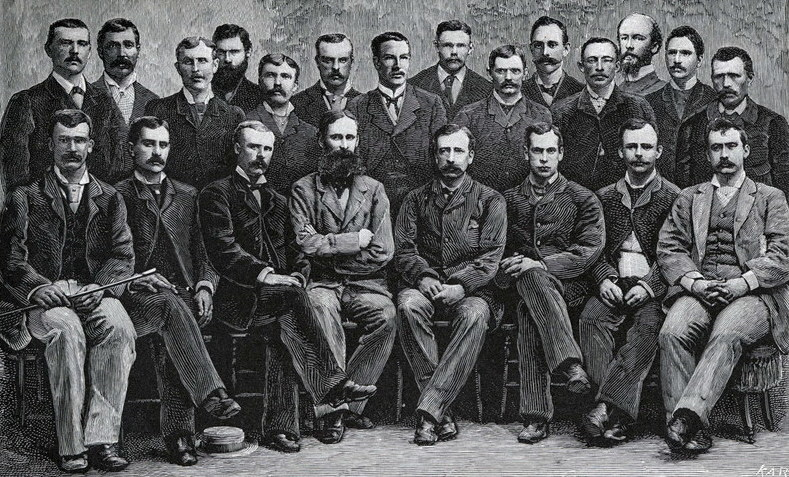
Expedition personnel prior to embarkation: Top row left to right: Whisler, Eller, Bender, Cross, Frederick, Lynn, Beiderdick, Henry, Long, Ralston, Salor, Dr Pavy, Gardner, Elison. Bottom row left to right: Connell, Brainard, Lt Kislingbury, Lt Greely, Lt Lockwood, Israel, Jewell, Rice. Absent is Schneider who replaced a deserter.

The Lady Franklin Bay Expedition (also known as Greely Expedition) of 1881–1884 to Lady Franklin Bay on Ellesmere Island in the Canadian Arctic was led by Lieutenant Adolphus Greely, and was promoted by the United States Army Signal Corps. Its purpose was to establish a meteorological-observation station as part of the First International Polar Year, and to collect astronomical and magnetic data. During the expedition, two members of the crew reached a new Farthest North record, but of the original twenty-five men, only six survived to return.

The expedition was under the auspices of the Signal Corps at a time when the corps' chief disbursements officer, Henry W. Howgate, was arrested for embezzlement. However, that did not deter the planning and execution of the voyage.

== Expedition ==
=== First year, 1881 ===
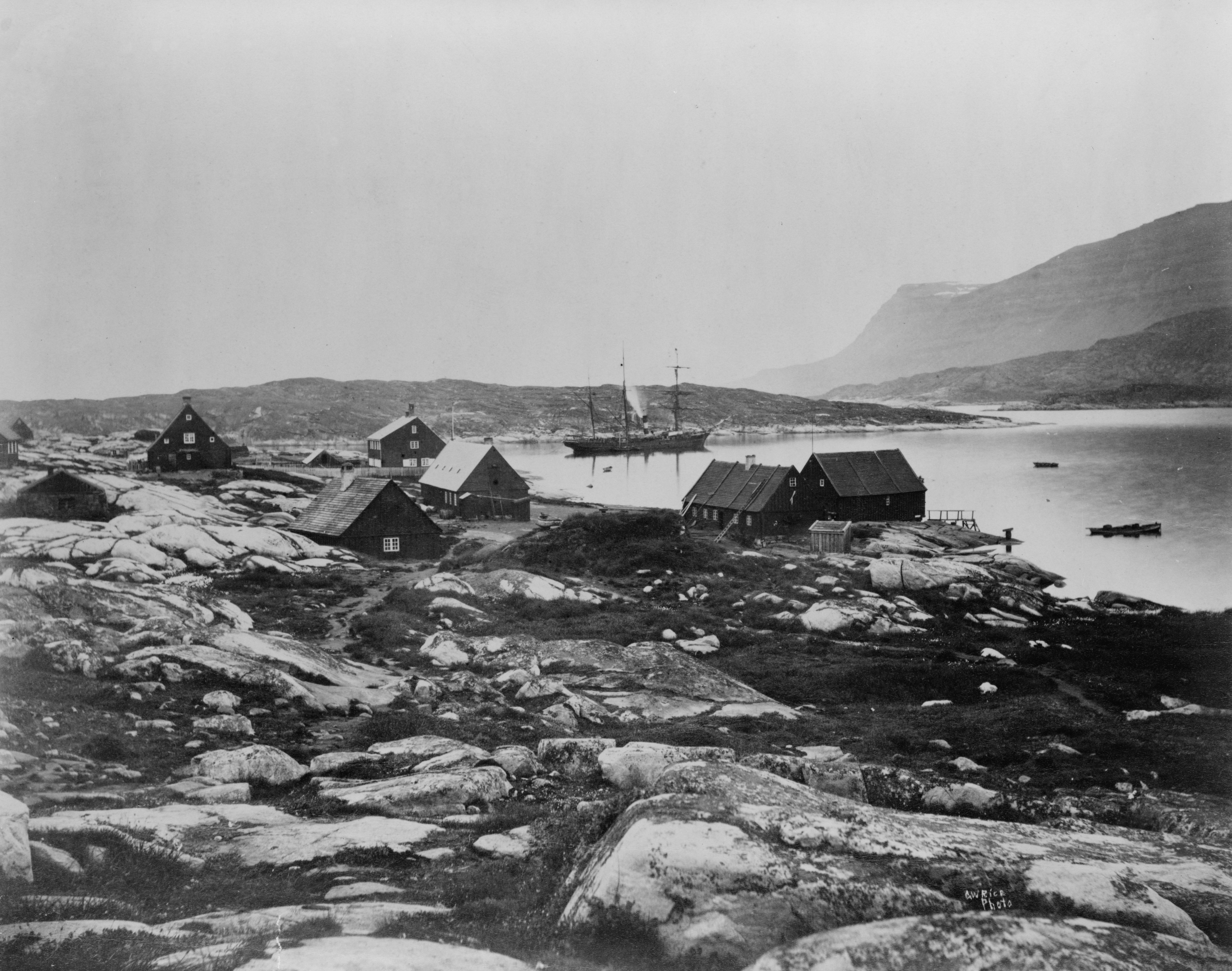
Proteus at Qeqertarsuaq harbor

The Lady Franklin Bay Expedition was led by Lieutenant Adolphus Greely of the Fifth United States Cavalry, with astronomer Edward Israel and photographer George W. Rice among the crew of twenty-five officers and men. They sailed on the ship Proteus and reached St. John's, Newfoundland, in early July 1881. At Godhavn, Greenland, they picked up two Inuit men, Jens Edward and Thorlip Frederik Christiansen, both dog sled drivers, as well as physician Octave Pierre Pavy and Mr. Clay who had continued scientific studies instead of returning on Florence with the remainder of the 1880 expedition of Henry W. Howgate.

Proteus arrived without problems at Lady Franklin Bay by August 11, dropped off men and provisions, and left. In the following months, Lieutenant James B. Lockwood and Sergeant David L. Brainard achieved a new Farthest North record at 83°24′N 40°46′W, off the north coast of Greenland. Unbeknownst to Greely, the summer had been extraordinarily warm, which led to an underestimation of the difficulties which their relief expeditions would face in reaching Lady Franklin Bay in subsequent years.

=== Second year, 1882 ===
By summer of 1882, the men were expecting a supply ship from the south. Neptune, laden with relief supplies, set out in July 1882 but, cut off by ice and weather, Captain Beebe was forced to turn around prematurely. All he could do was leave some supplies at Smith Sound in August, and the remaining provisions in Newfoundland, with plans for their delivery the following year.

On July 20, Pavy's contract ended, and Pavy announced that he would not renew it, but would continue to attend to the expedition's medical needs. Greely was incensed, and ordered the doctor to turn over all his records and journals. Pavy refused, and Greely placed him under arrest. Pavy was not confined, however Greely claimed he intended to court-martial him when they returned to the United States.

=== Third year, 1883 ===
In 1883, new rescue attempts by Proteus, commanded by Lieutenant Ernest Albert Garlington, and Yantic, commanded by Commander Frank Wildes, failed, with Proteus being crushed by pack ice.

Expedition return route

In the summer of 1883, in accordance with his instructions for the case of two consecutive relief expeditions not reaching Fort Conger, Greely decided to head South with his crew. It had been planned that the relief ships should depot supplies along the Nares Strait, around Cape Sabine and at Littleton Island, if they were unable to reach Fort Conger, which should have made for a comfortable wintering of Greely's men. But with Neptune not even getting that far and Proteus sunk, in reality only a small emergency cache with 40 days worth of supplies had been laid at Cape Sabine by Proteus.

When arriving there in October 1883, the season was too advanced for Greely to either try to brave the Baffin Bay to reach Greenland with his small boats, or to retire to Fort Conger, so he had to winter on the spot.

=== Fourth year, 1884 ===
On January 17, 1884, following a communication sent in December 1883 from Robert Todd Lincoln, the Secretary of War, and William E. Chandler, the Secretary of the Navy to Chester A. Arthur, the president of the United States. The president issued a message relative to the relief of Greely and his party for the consideration and approval of Congress. Chandler, was credited with planning the ensuing rescue effort, commanded by Commander Winfield Scott Schley. While four vessels—USS Bear, USS Thetis, HMS Alert, and Loch Garry—made it to Greely's camp on June 22, only seven men had survived the winter. The rest had succumbed to starvation, hypothermia, and drowning, and one man, Private Henry, had been executed on Greely's order for repeated theft of food. Of the seven rescued, Joseph Elison died on July 8 following multiple amputations. The relief party arrived at St. John's, Newfoundland on July 17, 1884, from which the news was telegraphed throughout the States, and a sketched portrait of the members of the Greely Expedition, both living and dead, was published. After a stay of ten days the ships left for New York.

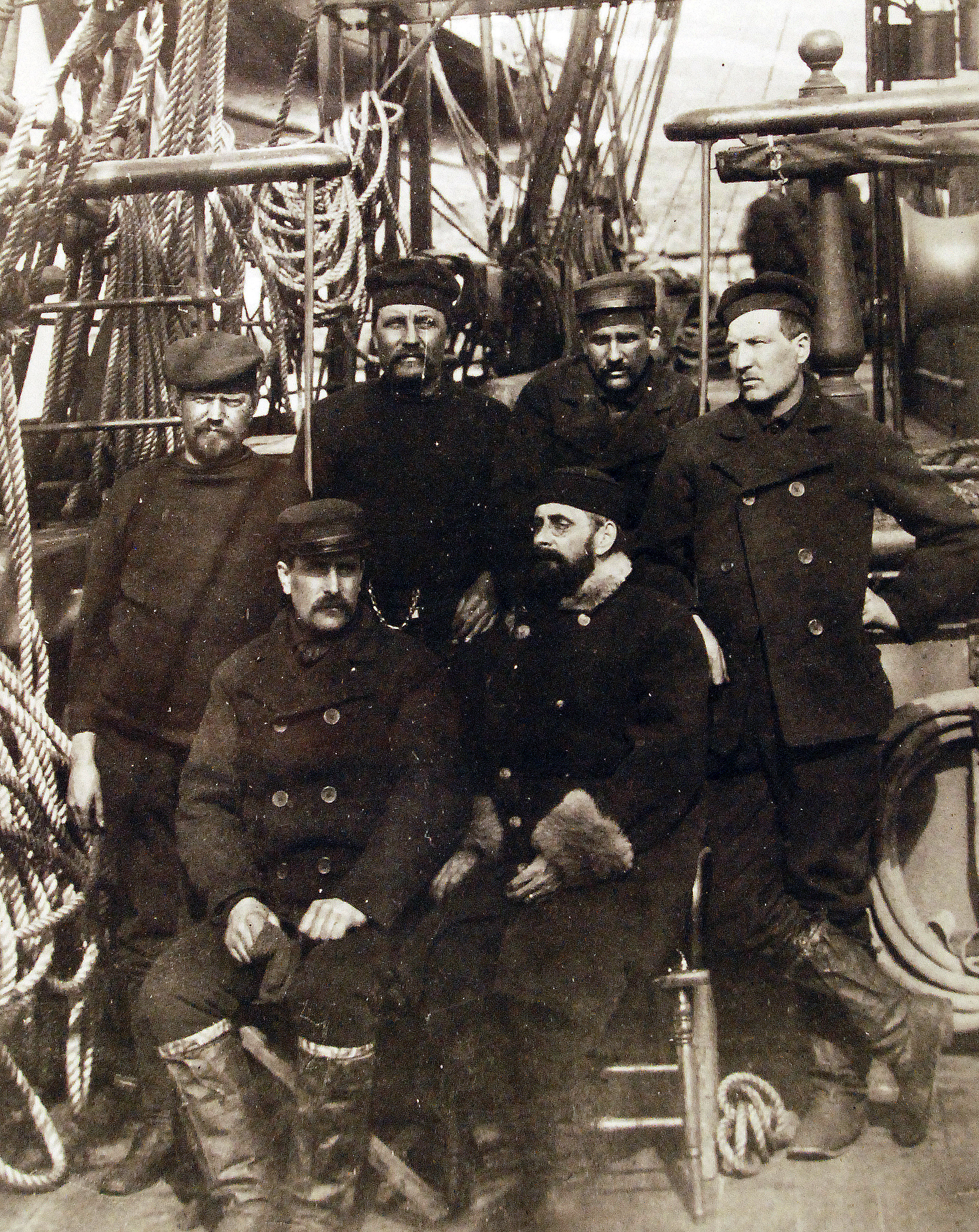
The six survivors. Top row, left to right: Private Francis Long, Sergeant Julius R. Frederick, Private Maurice Connell, Steward Henry Bierderbick. Bottom row, left to right: Sergeant David L. Brainard, Lieutenant Adolphus Greely

Civil War hero David Lewis Gifford served as an ice master – a specially trained navigator responsible for maneuvering ships through polar pack ice, floes, and frozen channels – on HMS Alert. By August 1884, the six survivors were being treated and recovering at the Navy Yard, Portsmouth, New Hampshire. The surviving members of the expedition were received as heroes. A parade attended by thousands was held in Portsmouth, New Hampshire. It was decided that each of the survivors was to be awarded a promotion in rank by the Army, although Greely reportedly refused. As to the men who perished during the expedition, Greely wrote that

"I should be unjust to the dead did I not call attention to their arduous labors, heroic endurance, and unflinching determination which advanced the national ensign to an unparalleled latitude, carried out the programme of international scientific observations, increased perhaps in an unequaled degree in this century our knowledge of the physical characteristics and configurations of polar lands, and who, more than all, in perhaps the most successful Arctic boat journey of the age, brought safely, at the price of great bodily suffering and diminished chances of life, through a dense polar pack, their records to a point whence they would eventually reach the world. They died for that end, and should not be forgotten."

== The original twenty-five men ==
1. First Lieutenant Adolphus Greely, 5th Cavalry Regiment, acting signal officer and the expedition's commander. He is one of the six men who survived.
2. Second Lieutenant Frederick F. Kislingbury, 11th Infantry Regiment, acting signal officer. He was relieved from duty August 26, 1881, and formally ordered to duty with the expedition on April 9, 1884. He died June 1, 1884.
3. Second Lieutenant James B. Lockwood, 23rd Infantry Regiment, acting signal officer. He died April 9, 1884.
4. Sergeant Edward Israel, United States Army Signal Corps. He died May 27, 1884.
5. Sergeant Winfield S. Jewell, United States Army Signal Corps. He died April 12, 1884.
6. Sergeant George W. Rice, United States Army Signal Corps. He died April 9, 1884.
7. Sergeant David C. Ralston, United States Army Signal Corps. He died May 23, 1884.
8. Sergeant Hampden S. Gardiner, United States Army Signal Corps. He died June 12, 1884.
9. Sergeant William H. Cross, General Service, United States Army. He died January 18, 1884.
10. Sergeant David L. Brainard, Company L, 2nd Cavalry Regiment. He is one of the six men who survived.
11. Sergeant David Linn, Company C, 2nd Cavalry Regiment. He died April 6, 1884.
12. Corporal Daniel C. Starr, Company F, 2nd Cavalry Regiment. He was forced to return on the Proteus on August 14, 1881, due to asthma, which made him unfit for the expedition.
13. Corporal Paul Grimm, Company H, 11th Infantry Regiment. He deserted and was replaced by Private Roderick R. Schenider, Company A, First Artillery. Schneider died June 18, 1884.
14. Corporal Nicholas Salor, Company H, 2nd Cavalry Regiment. He died June 3, 1884.
15. Corporal Joseph Elison, Company E, 10th Infantry Regiment. He died July 8, 1884.
16. Private Charles B. Henry, Company E, 5th Cavalry Regiment. He died June 6, 1884.
17. Private Maurice Connell, Company B, 3rd Cavalry Regiment. He was one of the six men who survived.
18. Private Jacob Bender, Company F, 9th Infantry Regiment. He died June 6, 1884.
19. Private Francis Long, Company F, 9th Infantry Regiment. He was one of the six men that survived.
20. Private William Whisler, Company F, 9th Infantry Regiment. He died on May 24, 1884.
21. Private Henry Bierderbick, Company G, 17th Infantry Regiment. He was one of the six men that survived.
22. Private Julius Fredericks, Company L, 2nd Cavalry Regiment. He was one of the six men that survived.
23. Private James Ryan, Company H, 2nd Cavalry Regiment. He was sent on board the Proteus on August 22, 1881, under orders to return to Washington on account of an epileptic attack.
24. Private William A. Ellis, Company C, 2nd Cavalry Regiment. He died May 19, 1884.
25. Dr. Octave Pavy, assistant surgeon, United States Army. He died June 6, 1884.

== Controversy ==
Rumors of cannibalism arose following the return of the corpses. On August 14, 1884, a few days after his funeral, the body of Lieutenant Frederick Kislingbury, second in command of the expedition, was exhumed and an autopsy was performed. The finding that flesh had been cut from the bones appeared to confirm the accusation. However, Greely and the surviving crew denied knowledge of cannibalism. Brainard and Rice had devised a method of netting sea-lice for food, (Note: Brainard euphemistically called them "shrimp".) and Greely surmised that if flesh had been cut from the bodies of the dead, some group members who died before being rescued needed bait, so they cut into the bodies of those who had previously died.

== Bibliography ==
- Berton, P. F. (1988). The Arctic Grail: The Quest for the North West Passage and the North Pole. New York: Viking Press. ISBN 9780670824915.
- Guttridge, L. F. (2000). Ghosts of Cape Sabine: The Harrowing True Story of the Greely Expedition. New York: G. P. Putnam's Sons. ISBN 9780399145896.
- Levy, Buddy (2019). Labyrinth of Ice: The Triumphant and Tragic Greely Polar Expedition. St. Martin's Press. ISBN 978-1250182197.
- Stein, S. K. (December 2006). "The Greely Relief Expedition and the New Navy". International Journal of Naval History. 5 (3): 1–17. ISSN 1932-6556.
- Węslawski, J. M.; Legeżyńska, J. (December 2002). "Chances for Arctic Survival: Greely's Expedition Revisited". Arctic. 55 (4): 373–379. doi:10.14430/arctic721. JSTOR 40512495.
