= Pim Island =

Island in Canada

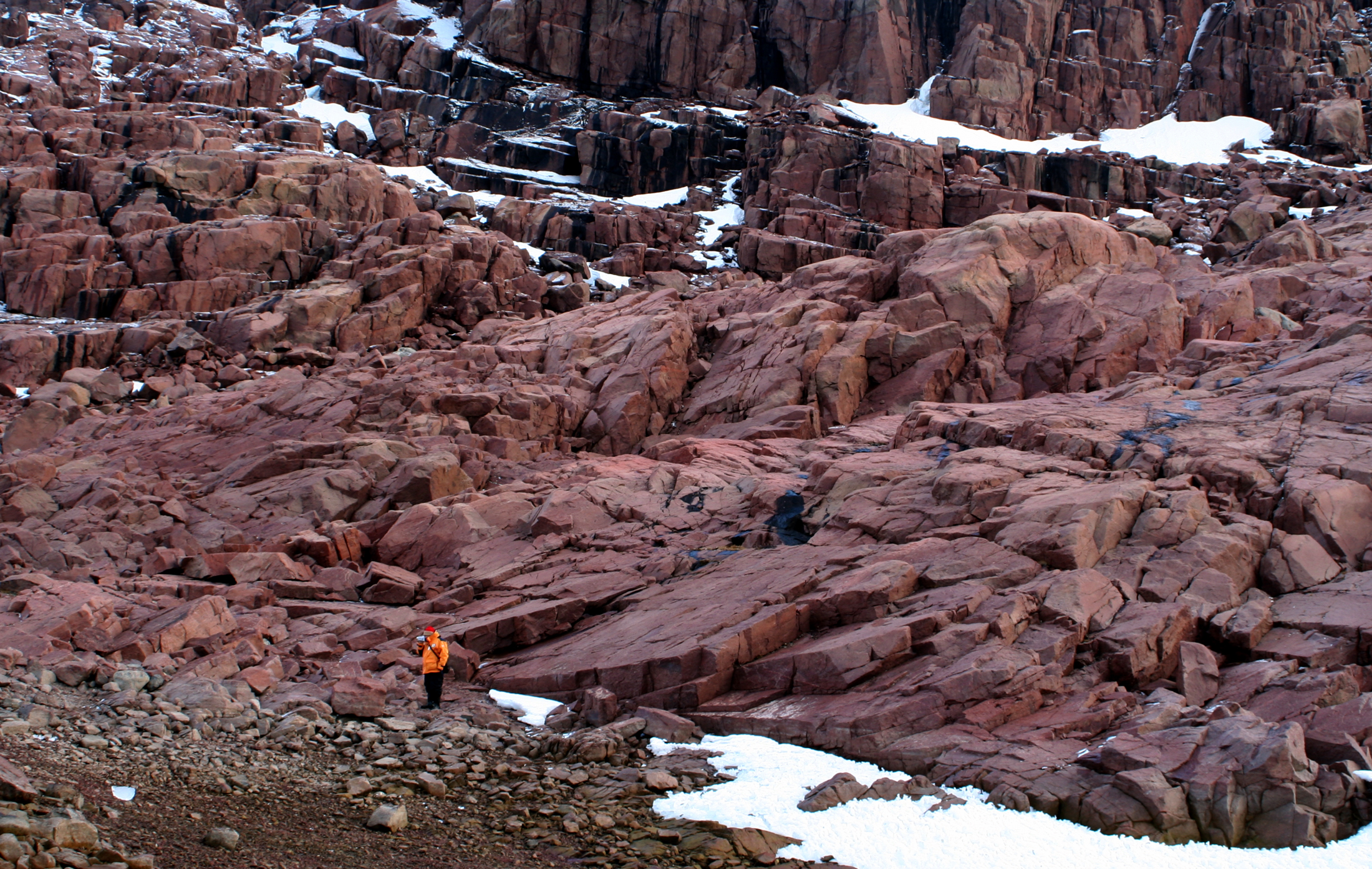
- 2005 photo of Pim Island

- Location within Nunavut Location within Canada

Geography
- Location: Northern Canada
- Coordinates: 78°44′N 074°25′W
- Archipelago: Queen Elizabeth Islands; Arctic Archipelago

Administration
- Canada
- Territory: Nunavut
- Region: Qikiqtaaluk

Demographics
- Population: Uninhabited

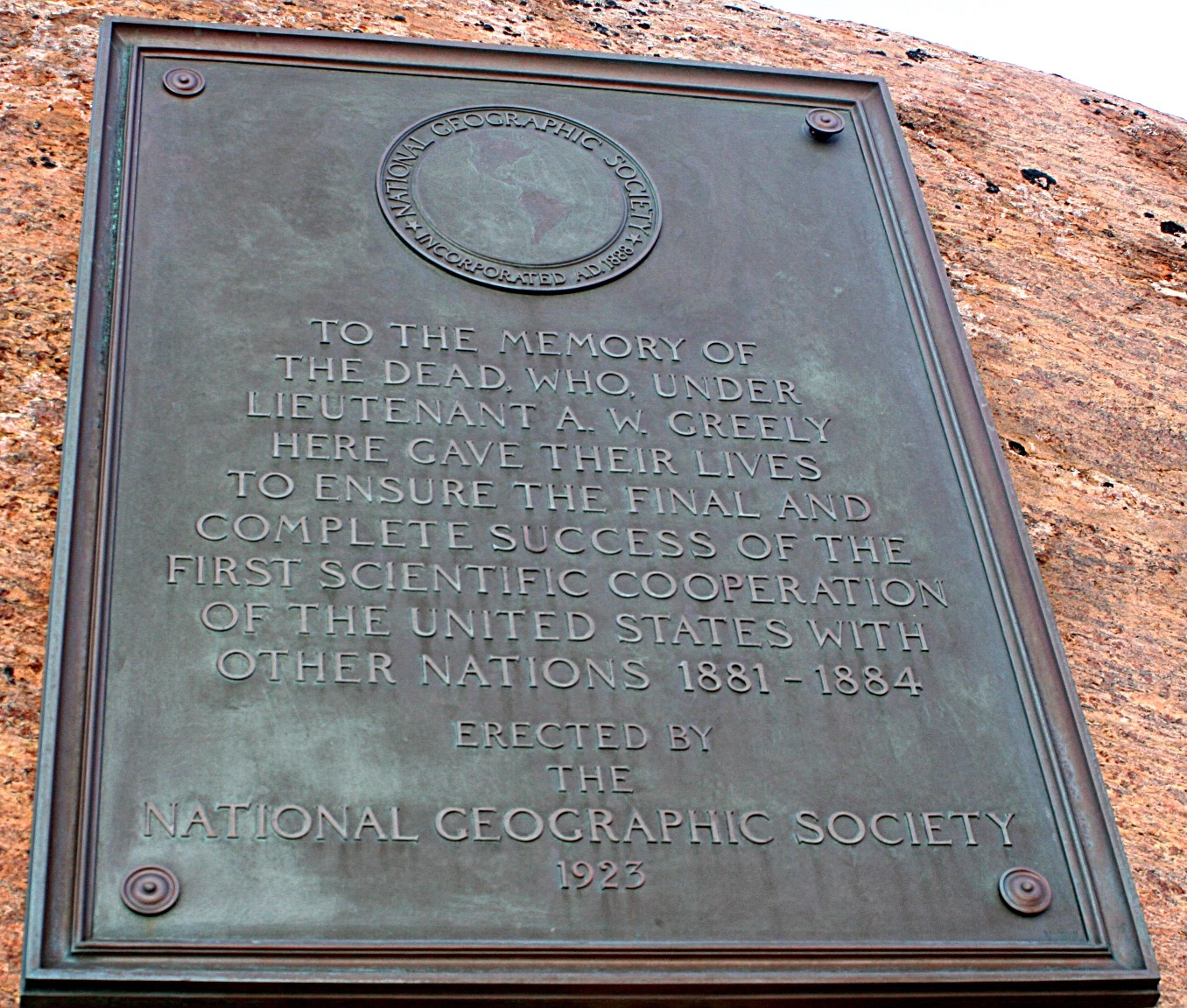
Plaque on Pim Island to the memory of dead men from the expedition of Adolphus Greely. Photographed in 2005

Pim Island (previously Bedford Pim Island) is an uninhabited island located off the eastern coast of Ellesmere Island, part of the Qikiqtaaluk Region of the Canadian territory of Nunavut. Located within the Arctic Archipelago, it is a part of the Queen Elizabeth Islands.

Pim Island is separated from Ellesmere Island by Rice Strait, the waterway that connects Rosse Bay to the south and Buchanan Bay to the north. Nares Strait is to the east. Pim Island is 6 kilometres (3.7 mi) from Cocked Hat Island.

== History ==
The Adolphus Greely expedition wintered at Camp Clay in 1883, and in 1884, Cape Sabine was the rescue site for Greely and the Lady Franklin Bay Expedition. The island is named in honour of naval officer and barrister Bedford Pim of HMS Resolute.
