= Rosse Bay =

Bay in Nunavut, Canada

- Location within Nunavut Location within Canada
- Location: Nares Strait
- Coordinates: 78°40′N 74°35′W
- Ocean/sea sources: Arctic Ocean
- Basin countries: Canada
- Settlements: Uninhabited

Rosse Bay is an Arctic waterway in the Qikiqtaaluk Region, Nunavut, Canada. It is located in Nares Strait between Pim Island and Ellesmere Island's Johan Peninsula. The bay is also connected to Rice Strait.

== Geography ==
Physical characteristics include a gravel and sand moraine ridge on its southwestern shore. There are also tidewater glaciers. The main discharge of Lefferts Glacier is into Rosse Bay.
