= Henry W. Howgate =

American Union Army officer (1835–1901)

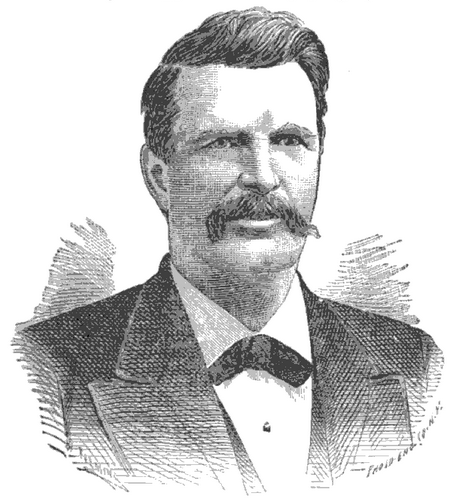
- Born: Henry Williamson Howgate; March 24, 1835; Leeds, England, UK
- Died: June 1, 1901 (aged 66); District of Columbia, US
- Military career
- Allegiance: United States
- Branch: Army Signal Corps
- Years of service: 1862–1880
- Rank: Captain
- Unit: 22nd Infantry Regiment
- Battles: Battle of Chickamauga

Henry Williamson Howgate (March 24, 1835 – June 1, 1901) was an American Army Signal Corps officer and Arctic explorer who embezzled over $133,000 from the U.S. Government. He escaped custody while on trial and evaded the Secret Service and Pinkerton Detective Agency for 13 years, during which time he worked as a reporter and ran a New York bookstore.

== Early life ==
Howgate was the son of a British shopkeeper. At age 21, Howgate immigrated to the United States and worked as a reporter. In 1866, he married Cordelia Day of Macomb County, Michigan. Howgate and Cordelia had one daughter, Ida, born in 1866.

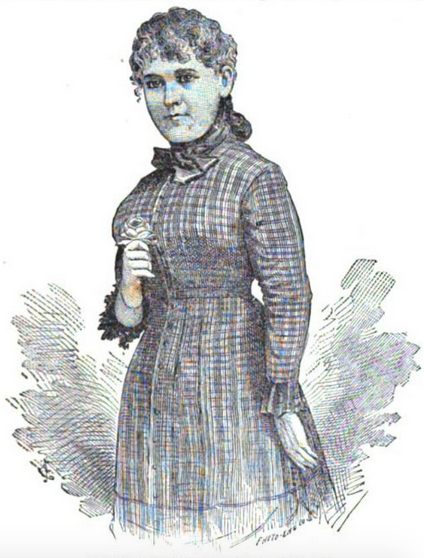
Nellie Pollard

Howgate met Nellie Pollard (alias "Burrell"; alias "Nettie Burrill") of Nebraska, or Massachusetts, early in his military career. She got a job working as a hostess in the Treasury Department in Washington through the influence of Senator Algernon Paddock. She remained Howgate's mistress for most of his life.

== Career ==
In 1862, Howgate became a second lieutenant with the 22nd Michigan Volunteer Infantry Regiment. In 1863, he became a first lieutenant in the U.S. Signal Corps. In 1867, he joined the 20th Infantry before re-joining the Signal Corps where he served as a property and disbursing officer before becoming responsible for planning all polar expeditions. Under his auspices, he was responsible for polar expeditions at a time when several countries were also supporting polar exploration and scientific studies. Fascinated with the Arctic, Howgate developed an extensive library of Arctic literature.

=== Preliminary expedition ===
The Howgate Preliminary Polar Expedition had two phases. The 1877 phase was tasked with establishing relationships with local Inuit promoting scientific experiments, and whaling as a source of revenue. Its vessel, the schooner Florence, was a fair sea-boat, but too small for the mission at 56 ton fore and aft. The Florence was captained by George Emory Tyson, Master, who had been assistant master and navigator of the Polaris under Charles Francis Hall. The Florence crew included Ludwig Kumlien, Orray Taft Sherman, and New London mariners.

The 1878 phase, to be captained by Howgate, was to join forces with the first crew and establish polar colonization. The Florence left New London on August 2, 1877, and first anchored at Niantilic Harbour, western Cumberland Sound, on September 12. It reached the winter harbor of Annanactook on October 6. While at Annanactook, Mr. Kumlien and Mr. Sherman engaged in notable scientific work, assisted by local Inuit.

The Florence was unable to leave Annanactook until early July, and when it did embark, on July 5, 1878, it was pressed ten miles east by an ice floe before making Kickatiue Island. The expedition arrived in Godhavn Harbor on July 31. There, Tyson learned that the government expedition steamer they were expecting to join forces with had been deferred. With phase one complete and phase two abandoned, the Florence sailed home on August 22, reaching Boston harbor on October 30.

=== Arctic expedition ===
The Howgate Arctic Expedition was tasked with scientific and geographical exploration of Greenland in preparation for an 1881 International Polar Year expeditionary force and Arctic colonization. However, the Army and Navy decided, in June 1880, to withdraw support of the Howgate Arctic Expedition as the expeditionary vessel, the steamship Gulnare, was unseaworthy. Howgate, not to be deterred, found private funding.

The Gulnare departed in July, captained by Lieutenant Gustavus A. Doane. The crew included Sergeant David Legge Brainard, George W. Rice, Dr. Octave Pavy and Henry Clay. On August 3, in a heavy gale, the Gulnare was damaged and lost a deck boat and her entire deck load. The steamer reached Disko on August 8 and repairs lasted through August 21. Pavy did not join the crew for the home voyage, instead staying in Greenland to continue scientific studies. Doane reported ironically:

The cruise of the Gulnare is the first acknowledged failure in Arctic annals. We did but little, but left a great many things undone requiring some moral courage to refrain from doing. We did not change the names of all the localities visited, as is customary, nor give them new latitudes to the bewilderment of the general reader. We do not dispute anyone's attained distance not declare it impossible that he should have been where he was. We did not hunt up nameless islands and promontories to tag them with the surnames ... We did not even erect cenotaphs ... We received no flags, converted no natives, killed no one ... The object of this report is to expose a few of the specious pleas, fallacious reasonings, and ill-grounded conjectures which are called scientific, and to place the subject of circumpolar exploration on a basis of facts and reasonable probabilities. One cannot explore the earth's surface from an observatory, nor by mathematics, nor by the power of logic. It must be done physically.

=== International Polar Year ===
Howgate was active in soliciting international support, including with the Société de Géographie, for the Howgate Plan, his vision of an Arctic colony. Karl Weyprecht, an officer in the Austro-Hungarian Navy who co-led, with Julius von Payer, the 1872–1874 Austro-Hungarian North Pole Expedition that discovered Franz Josef Land, made a presentation at the 48th Meeting of German Scientists and Physicians in 1875 where he, too, made recommendations for establishment of fixed Arctic observation stations. The Smithsonian Museum's Spencer Fullerton Baird, in his 1877 Annual Record of Science and Industry, says that Weyprecht, and others, made recommendations for manned polar stations at that year's International Congress of Meteorologists, adding:

As these proposed international Polar stations are for purely scientific observations, and as their plan so perfectly harmonizes with the Howgate plan of an Arctic colony, it is to be hoped that our own government will establish, at least, two such scientific stations.

While the Howgate Expedition of 1880 was ultimately a failure, Howgate was able to pocket hundreds of thousands of dollars to plan a new expedition to coincide with the First International Polar Year. Named the Lady Franklin Bay Expedition, its purpose was to establish and sustain, with adequate supplies, an Arctic colony near the northeastern tip of Ellesmere Island. It was based on assumptions that Lady Franklin Bay could be reached every summer by ship, and that ships hindered Arctic adaptation. The colony was to be dropped off and left on its own in 1881 near the coal seam found previously by George Nares, relief supplies were to arrive in 1882, and the expeditionary team was to be picked up in 1883.

Though it was clear that some shared Howgate's enthusiasm for manned Arctic Circle stations, others did not. Captain Sir Frederick John Owen Evans commented:

This ... appears to be a renewal of the Howgate Expedition of 1880 ... which was unsuccessful. There is now engrafted on the Howgate Expedition the taking part in a scheme (not yet matured) for various nations to found stations in the Arctic Circle ... the time available, the money voted, the means proposed, all appear to be equally inadequate for the contemplated purpose.

== Legal issues ==
Fearing his embezzlement of government funds would soon be discovered, Howgate resigned his military commission on December 7, 1880. In 1881, the Signal Corps was in turmoil over allegations of fraud, scandals, and embezzlement. An investigation began into Howgate's handling of fraudulent U.S. Government vouchers, totaling up to $237,000. Some alleged that Signal Service employees assisted Howgate with the embezzlement which amounted to between $370,000 and $380,000. On August 15, Howgate was arrested at the Avery House in Mount Clemens, Michigan. The government began actions on August 24 to recover $133,000 from Howgate. Plans for the Lady Franklin Bay Expedition continued despite Howgate's sudden departure and the subsequent investigation.

=== Indictment ===
Howgate was indicted for embezzlement in 1882, but slipped away from authorities on April 13, 1882, while on a court-supervised visit to his home where his daughter sang to the marshal for an hour while he was supposed to be changing his underwear but in fact was fleeing across the Potomac River. A judgment against Howgate was made in absentia on May 24, 1883, in the amount of $101,000 plus interest.

Secretary of War Robert Todd Lincoln authorized Secret Service operatives to stake out Howgate's possible hiding place in New Orleans, but, spotting them, Howgate and his mistress departed quickly for Nebraska City. There, Howgate visited former Signal Corps officer, now attorney, Albert S. Cole for assistance to file a claim that the government actually owed Howgate money. Howgate moved on to Escanaba, Michigan, where he assumed the alias H. W. Harrison and worked as a reporter. Afraid that the Secret Service could not capture Howgate, Lincoln hired the Pinkerton Detective Agency, who tried but failed to bribe Cole for information on Howgate's whereabouts.

=== Capture ===
Howgate was captured, in New York City on September 28, 1894, and spent the night at the Ludlow Street Jail. He was using the alias "Henry Williams" and had been leading the life of an old book and print dealer at 80 Fourth Avenue since 1888. Howgate was living with Burrell (alias "Mrs. Williams") on West Tenth Street. During this period he also claimed to have been a talesman for juries in trials assigned to the city's Court of General Sessions. Howgate was brought before Judge Charles L. Benedict, who signed the arrest warrant. The New York Times reported that Howgate was accused of embezzling $370,000 from the U.S. Government. Found guilty of numerous crimes, Howgate served time in Albany Penitentiary.

== Later life ==
Upon release in December 1900, Howgate moved to his daughter Ida's home in Washington, D.C., where he died of a cerebral hemorrhage in 1901.
