= Buchanan Bay =

Bay in Nunavut, Canada

- Location within Nunavut Location within Canada
- Location: Nares Strait
- Coordinates: 78°58′N 75°11′W
- Ocean/sea sources: Arctic Ocean
- Basin countries: Canada
- Settlements: Uninhabited

Buchanan Bay is an Arctic waterway in Qikiqtaaluk Region, Nunavut, Canada. It is located in Nares Strait by eastern Ellesmere Island. The bay is bordered by Cape Camperdown on Bache Peninsula to the north, Cape Rutherford on Johan Peninsula to the south, and the Alexandra Fiord at its head.

It is 64 km (40 mi) long, and up to 32 km (20 mi) wide.

== Fauna ==
Muskox frequent the area.
