= Littleton Islands =

Two small coastal islands off Greenland

Native name: Pikiuleq
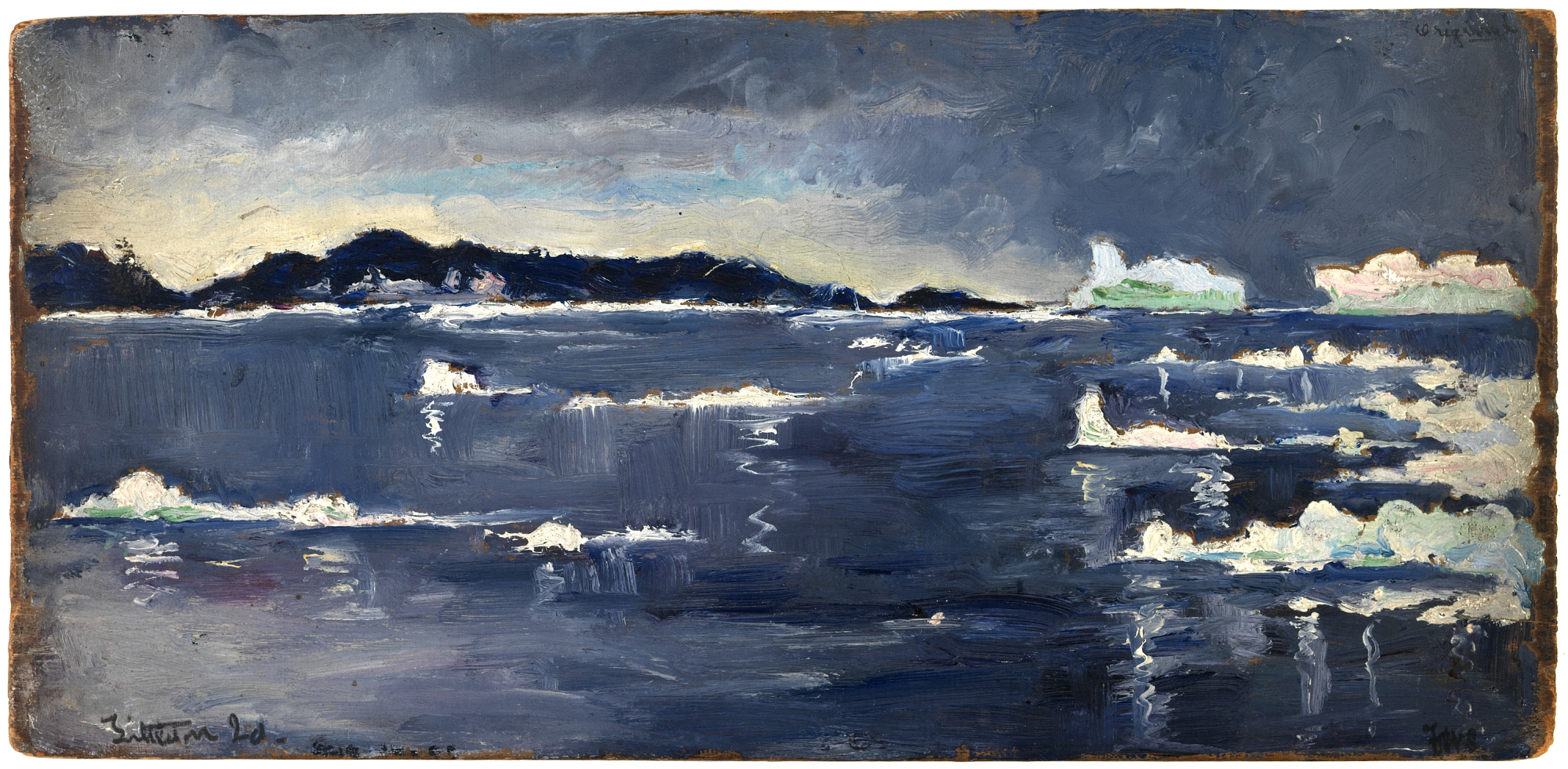
- Littleton Island. Painting by Frank Wilbert Stokes (1858 - 1955)

- Location within Greenland

Geography
- Location: Smith Sound
- Coordinates: 78.367°N 72.853°W
- Total islands: 2

Administration
- Greenland
- Municipality: Avannaata

Demographics
- Population: 0

The Littleton Islands, (Greenlandic: Pikiuleq) are a group of two small coastal islands, the largest of which is Littleton Island. They are located in the Avannaata municipality, off NW Greenland.

== Geography ==
Littleton is a group of two rocky islets.

- Littleton Island (Littleton Ø), the main island, lies approximately 1 km (0.6 mi) from NW Greenland’s coast in the Hatherton Bay, Smith Sound area.
- McGary Island (McGary Ø) is a much smaller islet, separated from the northwestern shore of the main island by a narrow sound.

Littleton and the nearby area are one of the largest breeding grounds in Greenland for the common eider and have been designated an Important Bird Area.

== History ==
In July 1853, during the Second Grinnell Expedition on the brig Advance Kane built a cairn on Littleton Island. Kane named one of the adjacent islets Hans Island after Hans Hendrik, the native Greenlandic helper he had with him on the trip. The islet lies about 300 km (190 mi) south of the island today called Hans Island —that this is part of the Littleton Island cluster is testified by Kane mentioning Edward Augustus Inglefield, who named Littleton Island.

Later in the expedition Christian Ohlsen died on the Littleton Island on 12 June 1855.

== See also ==
- List of islands of Greenland
