= Cape Sabine =

Land point in Nunavut, Canada

- Cape
- Coordinates: 78°43′55″N 74°6′0″W
- Location: Pim Island, Qikiqtaaluk Region, Nunavut, Canada
- Offshore water bodies: Smith Sound

Area
  - Total: Arctic
- Topo map: NTS 39E11 (untitled)

Cape Sabine is a land point on Pim Island, off the eastern shores of the Johan Peninsula, Ellesmere Island, in the Smith Sound, Qikiqtaaluk Region, Nunavut, Canada.

== History ==
The cape was named after Arctic explorer Sir Edward Sabine (1788–1883), was the site of the winter camp of Adolphus Greely and the Lady Franklin Bay Expedition in 1883–1884.

== Notable people ==
- Edward Israel
