= Adolphus Greely =

American polar explorer and army general (1844–1935)

Adolphus W. Greely
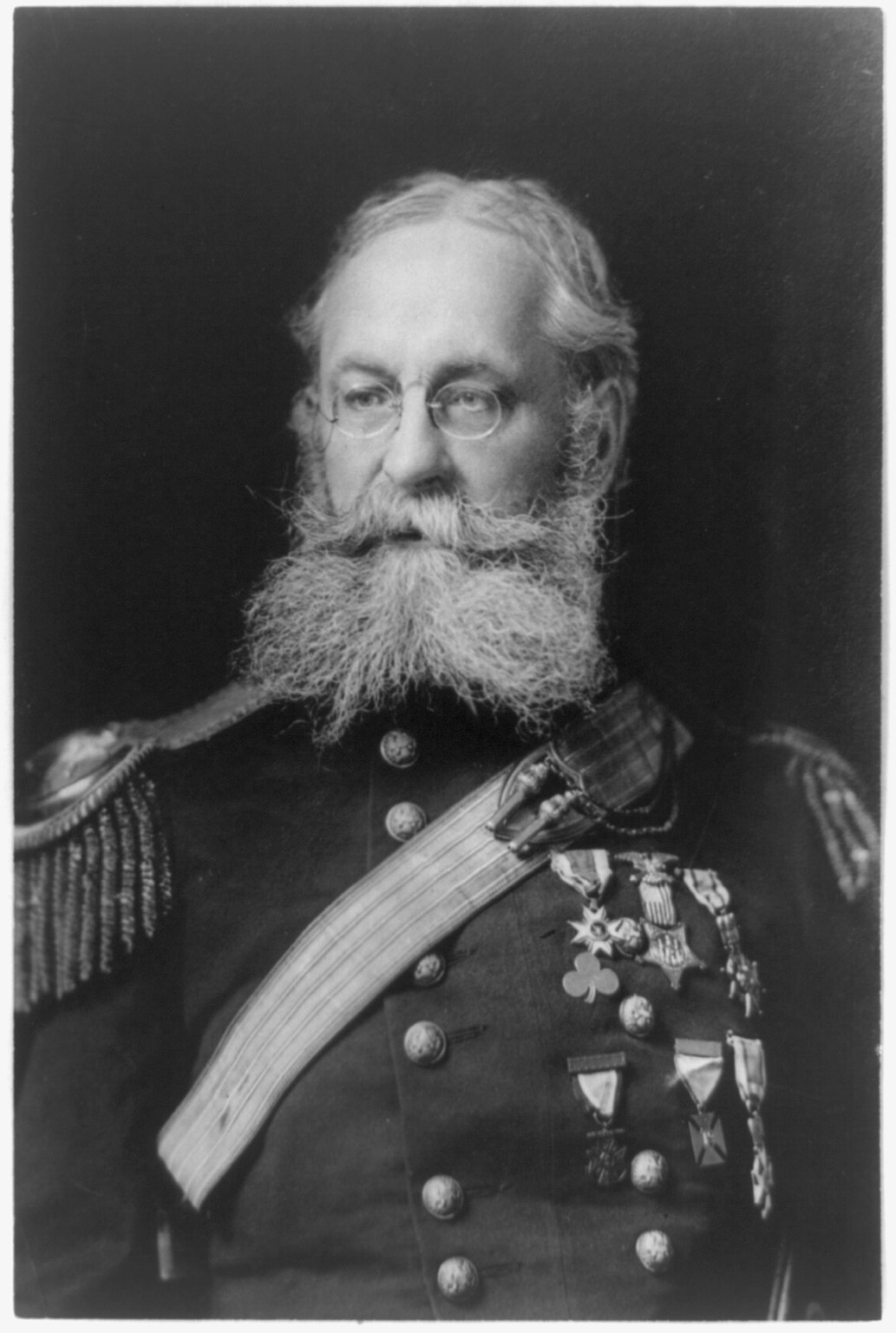
- Greely in uniform, 1890
- Born: Adolphus Washington Greely; March 27, 1844; Newburyport, Massachusetts, U.S.
- Died: October 20, 1935 (aged 91); Washington, D.C., U.S.
- Burial place: Arlington National Cemetery
- Spouse: Henrietta Nesmith (m. 1878-1918, her death)
- Children: 7 (including Rose Greely)
- Military career
- Allegiance: United States
- Branch: United States Army
- Service years: 1861–1908
- Rank: Major General
- Commands: Lady Franklin Bay Expedition; Chief Signal Officer of the U.S. Army; Pacific Division; Northern Division; Department of the Columbia; Department of Dakota
- Conflicts: American Civil War; American Indian Wars; Spanish–American War; Philippine–American War
- Awards: Medal of Honor

Adolphus Washington Greely FRSGS (March 27, 1844 – October 20, 1935) was a United States Army officer and polar explorer. He attained the rank of major general and was a recipient of the Medal of Honor.

A native of Newburyport, Massachusetts, and an 1860 graduate of Brown High School (now Newburyport High School), in 1861 he enlisted in the Union Army for the American Civil War. He received his commission as a second lieutenant in 1863 and was promoted to first lieutenant in 1864 and captain in 1865. At the end of the war he received a brevet promotion to major in recognition of his wartime accomplishments.

After the war, Greely accepted a second lieutenant's commission in the regular army. In 1881, he was appointed to command the Lady Franklin Bay Expedition, a 25-man expedition organized to carry out Arctic explorations. The expedition ran short of food and several resupply and rescue missions were unsuccessful, and by the time Greely and his men were rescued in 1884, there were only six survivors.

In March 1887, Greely was serving as a captain when President Grover Cleveland appointed him as the Army's Chief Signal Officer with the rank of brigadier general. As Signal chief, he was responsible for creating and maintaining the worldwide communications networks required during and after the Spanish–American War and during the Philippine–American War. Greely was promoted to major general in February 1906. In April 1906, he was assigned to command relief efforts following the San Francisco earthquake. Greely left the Army in 1908 after reaching the mandatory retirement age of 64.

In retirement, Greely authored numerous magazine articles and books on his Arctic experiences. In March 1935, he was awarded the Medal of Honor in recognition of "his life of splendid public service." Greely died in Washington, D.C., on October 20, 1935. He was buried at Arlington National Cemetery.

== Early life and education ==
Greely was born in Newburyport, Massachusetts, on March 27, 1844, the son of John Balch Greeley and Frances Dunn Cobb Greely. He was educated in Newburyport and was an 1860 graduate of Brown High School (now Newburyport High School).

== Early career ==
After having been rejected twice, on 26 July 1861, he joined the Union Army for the American Civil War, enlisting in the 19th Massachusetts Infantry Regiment. Over the next two years he worked his way up the enlisted ranks to first sergeant. On 18 March 1863, he was commissioned as a second lieutenant in the 81st United States Colored Infantry. He was promoted to first lieutenant on 26 April 1864 and to captain on 4 April 1865. After the war he received a brevet promotion to major in recognition of his meritorious service. He was mustered out of the Volunteer Army on 22 March 1867.

During his Civil War service, Greely took part in several battles, including Ball's Bluff, Antietam, and Fredericksburg. From 1865 to 1867, Greely took part in the post-war occupation of New Orleans.

He was commissioned as a second lieutenant in the 36th Infantry Regiment of the Regular Army on 7 March 1867 and was reassigned to the 5th Cavalry Regiment on 14 July 1869 after the 36th Infantry was disbanded. Greely was detailed for service with the Signal Corps from 1871 to 1880, and he was promoted to first lieutenant on 27 May 1873.

With the Signal Corps, which also included the Weather Bureau, Greely was recognized as an expert weather forecaster. His efforts helped establish the floodplains of the Mississippi, Missouri, and Ohio Rivers, which facilitated Corps of Engineers flood control projects. In addition, he oversaw planning, construction, and maintenance of several telegraph lines, including lines in remote areas of Indian Territory, Texas, Dakota Territory, and Montana Territory.

=== Lady Franklin Bay Expedition ===
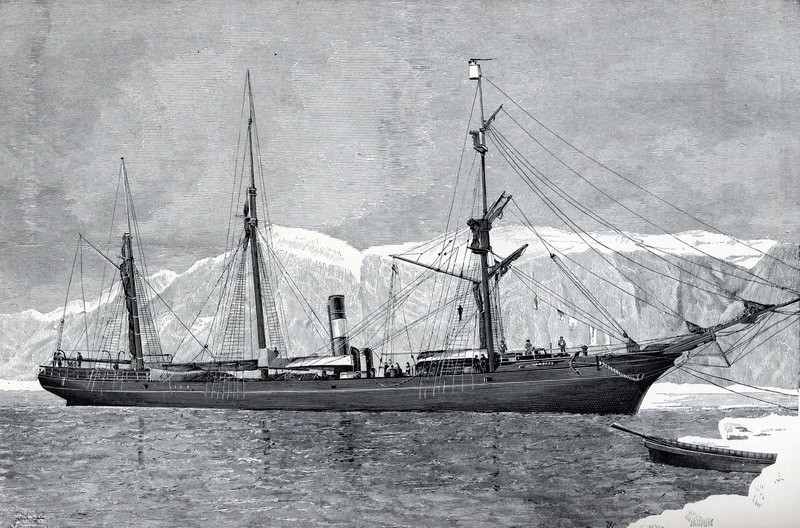
Steamer Proteus in Arctic 1881

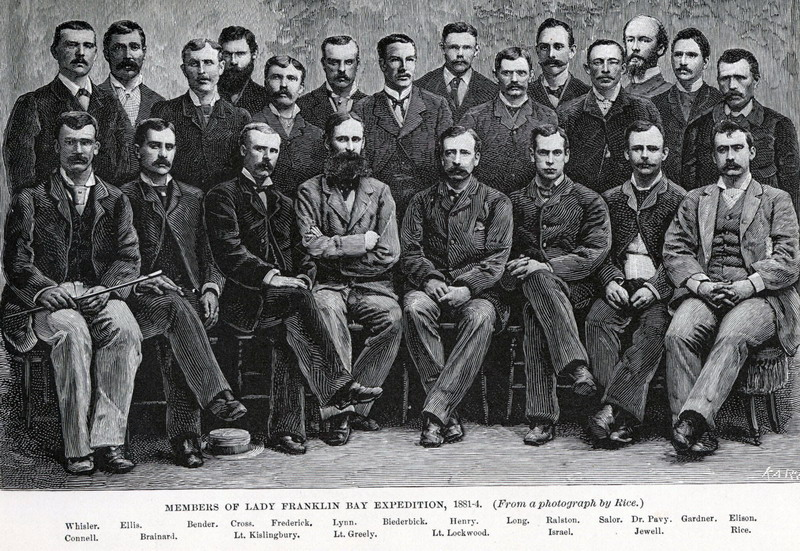
The Explorers of Lady Franklin Bay prior to departure in 1881. Photograph by Moses Rice.

In 1881, First Lieutenant Greely was named to command the Lady Franklin Bay Expedition. Promoted by Henry W. Howgate, its purpose was to establish one of a chain of meteorological-observation stations as part of the First International Polar Year. The expedition also was commissioned by the US government to collect astronomical and polar magnetic data, which was carried out by the astronomer Edward Israel, who was part of Greely's crew. Another goal of the expedition was to search for any clues of USS Jeannette, lost in the Arctic two years earlier.

The expedition sailed on the steamship SS Proteus. Greely was without previous Arctic experience, but he and his party succeeded in discovering and exploring much of the coast of northwest Greenland. The expedition also crossed Ellesmere Island from east to west, and James B. Lockwood and David Legge Brainard achieved a new "farthest north" record of 83° 23' 8" on Lockwood Island. In 1882, Greely sighted a mountain range during a dog sledding exploration to the interior of northern Ellesmere Island and named it the Conger Range. He also sighted the Innuitian Mountains from Lake Hazen.

Greely's party ran into difficulty when two supply parties failed to reach Greely's encampment at Fort Conger on Ellesmere Island in 1882 and 1883. In accordance with his instructions, Greely decided in August 1883 to abandon Fort Conger and travel south. His team reached Cape Sabine expecting to find food and equipment left by the supply ships, but these had not been provided. With winter setting in Greely and his men were forced to remain at Cape Sabine with inadequate rations and little fuel.

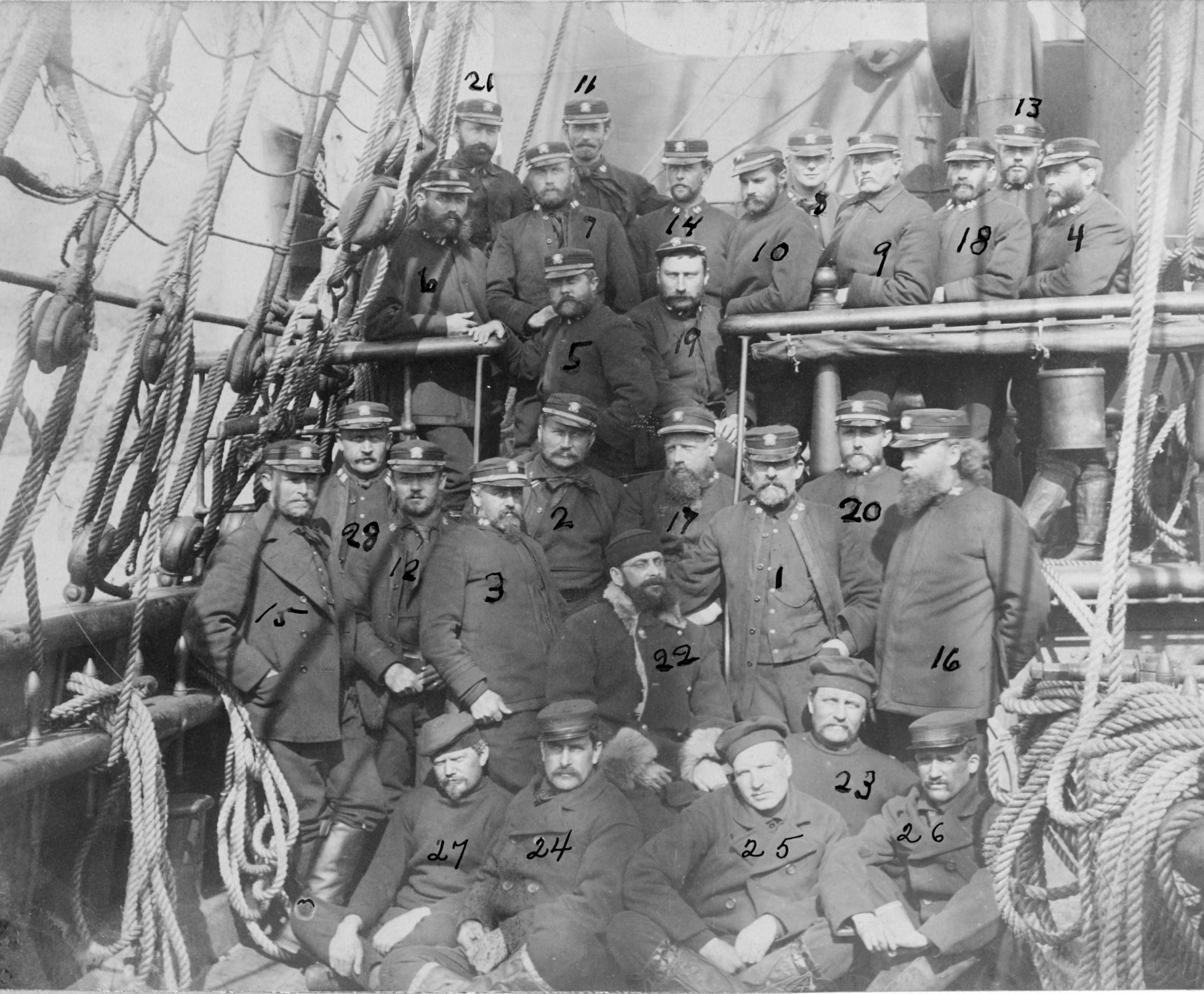
The six survivors of the U.S. Army's Greely Arctic expedition with their U.S. Navy rescuers, at Upernavik, Greenland, 2–3 July 1884. Probably photographed on board the USS Thetis. (22: Adolphus Greely, 23: Julius Frederick, 24: David L. Brainard, 25: Henry Bierderbick, 26: Maurice Connell, 27: Francis Long

A rescue expedition, led by Capt. Winfield Scott Schley on USRC Bear (a former whaler built in Greenock, Scotland), was sent to rescue the Greely party. By the time Bear and the ships Thetis and Alert arrived on June 22, 1884, 18 of Greely's 25 men had perished from starvation, drowning, hypothermia, and, in one case, a gunshot from the execution of a soldier ordered by Greely as punishment for repeatedly stealing food.

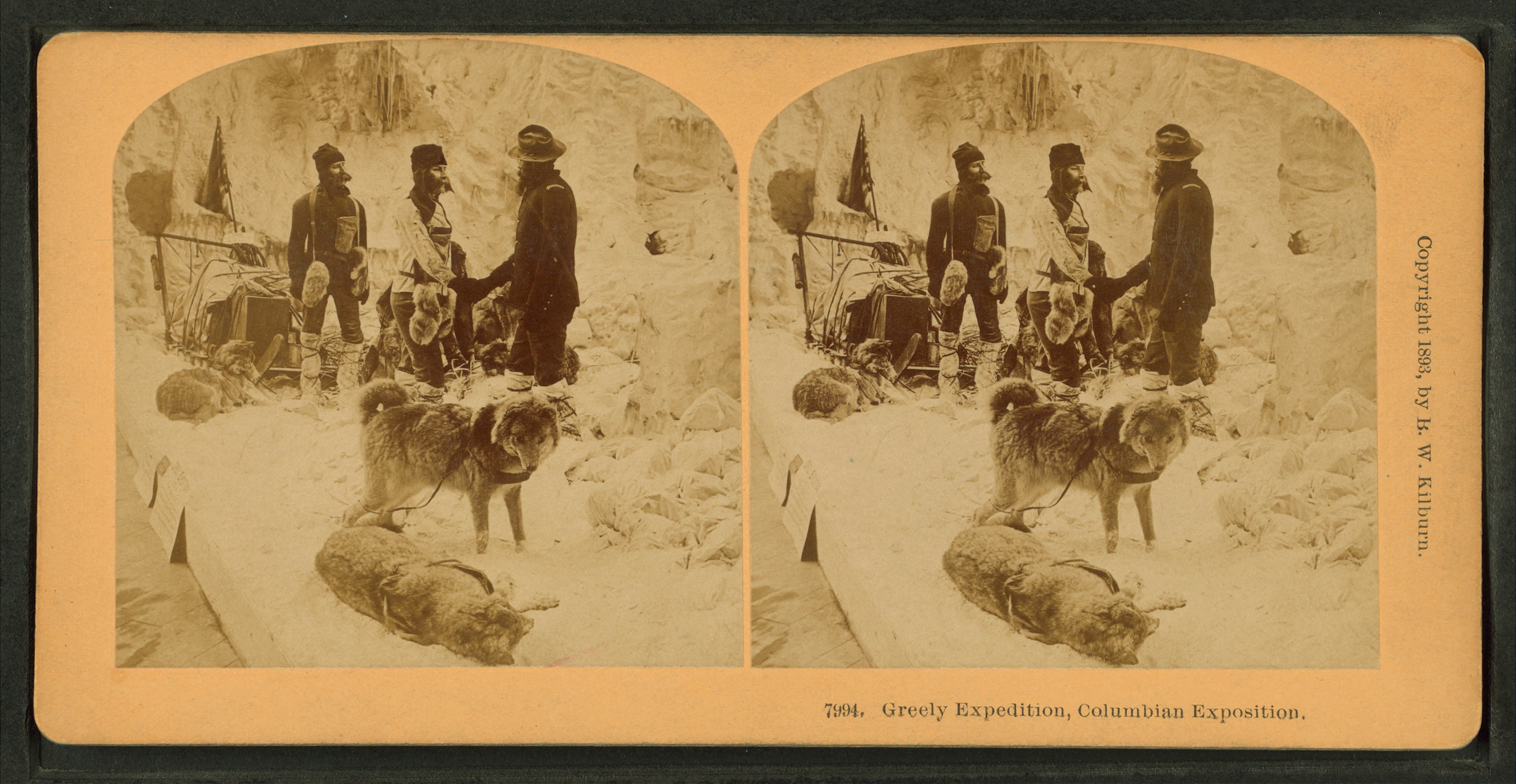
Stereoscopic image of the Greely expedition exhibition at the Columbian Exposition, 1893

Greely and the other survivors were near death; one died on the homeward journey. They were venerated as heroes, though the heroism was temporarily tainted by sensational accusations of cannibalism, which Greely denied. An exhibition on the Greely expedition was part of the Columbian Exposition in 1893 and was captured on stereoscopic images.

== Later career ==
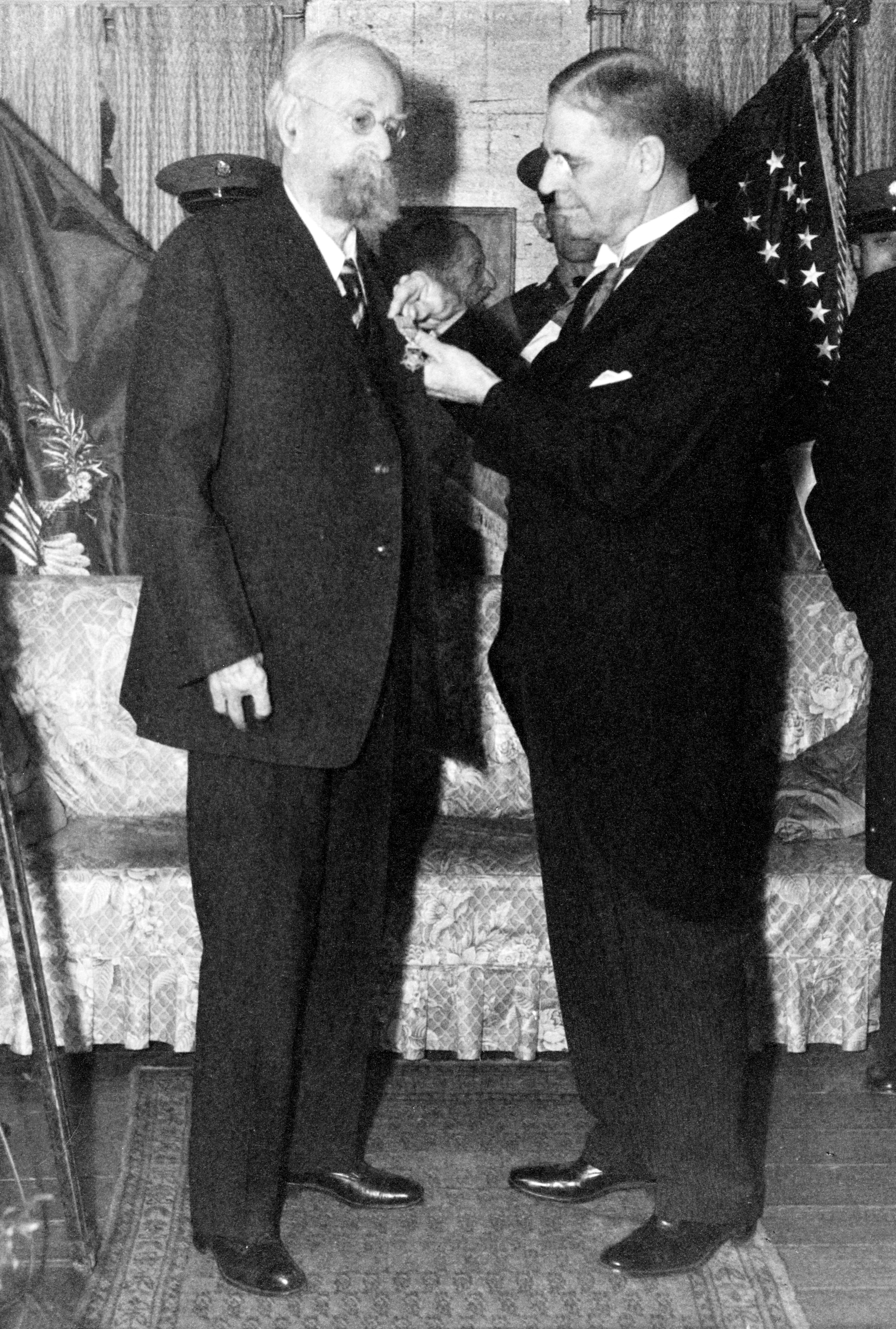
Greely receives the Medal of Honor from Secretary of War George Dern (1935)

In June 1886, Greely was promoted to captain. In March 1887, President Grover Cleveland appointed him as Chief Signal Officer of the U.S. Army with the rank of brigadier general. During his tenure as Chief Signal Officer of the Army, he oversaw construction, operation, and maintenance of numerous telegraph lines during and after the Spanish–American War, including: Puerto Rico, 800 miles (1,300 kilometers); Cuba, 3,000 mi (4,800 km); and the Philippines, 10,200 mi (16,400 km). Greely also oversaw construction under adverse conditions a telegraph system for Alaska consisting of nearly 4,000 mi (6,400 km) of submarine cables, land cables and 107 mi (172 km) of wireless telegraphy, which at the time was the longest regularly working commercial system in the world. Greely went aboard the cable ship USAT Burnside in 1903 to personally supervise the laying of submarine cable for the system.

Greely's innovations as Chief Signal Officer led to the Army's fielding of wireless telegraphy, airplanes, motorized automobiles and trucks, and other modern equipment. He represented the United States at the 1903 International Telegraph Congress in London and the 1903 International Wireless Telegraph Congress in Berlin. As an expert on the telegraph, Greely worked on some of the first international telecommunication treaties.

On February 10, 1906, he was promoted to major general and assigned to command the Pacific Division. In 1906, he commanded the relief effort that followed the San Francisco earthquake. As commander of the Northern Division, Greely was responsible for negotiating an end to the 1905-1906 Ute Rebellion. Greely commanded the Department of the Columbia in 1907. His terminal assignment was commander of the Department of Dakota in late 1907 and early 1908. In 1908, Greely reached the mandatory retirement age of 64.

== Death ==
Greely died in Washington, D.C., on October 20, 1935. He was buried at Arlington National Cemetery. Honorary pallbearers included David L. Brainard, Charles McKinley Saltzman, George Sabin Gibbs, Irving J. Carr, Leon Kromer, Billy Mitchell, and Gilbert Hovey Grosvenor.

== Personal life ==
In 1890, Greely was a founding member of the District of Columbia Society of the Sons of the American Revolution (SAR) and was elected vice president. Upon the death of Admiral David D. Porter in February 1891, Greely became president, and he served until the end of 1892. Greely was a companion of the District of Columbia Commandery of the Military Order of the Loyal Legion of the United States. He was also a member of the General Society of the War of 1812 and Grand Army of the Republic.

Greely was member of Washington's Cosmos Club. In 1904, he was elected a member of the American Philosophical Society. In 1905, he was selected as the first president of The Explorers Club. In 1911, Greely represented the Army at the coronation of King George V.

=== Marriage and family ===
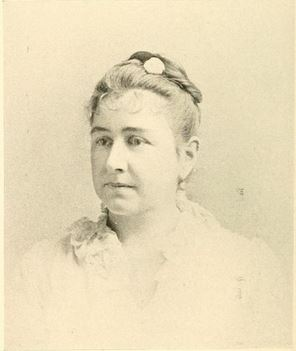
Henrietta Nesmith

In 1878, Greely married Henrietta Nesmith, and they remained married until her death in 1918. Henrietta Greely was a member of the Daughters of the American Revolution and one of the founding vice presidents general of the Children of the American Revolution. The Greelys were the parents of seven children, of whom six lived to adulthood:

- Antoinette (1879–1968), a social worker who never married and lived in New Hampshire and Texas
- Adola (1881–1961), the wife of Reverend Charles Lawrence Adams
- Baby boy (1881–1881), Adola's twin
- John (1885–1965), a veteran of World War I and World War II who attained the rank of brigadier general in the Army
- Rose (1887–1969), a noted landscape architect.
- Adolphus (1889–1956), an engineer and Army veteran of World War I who attained the rank of major
- Gertrude (1891–1969), the wife of Dr. G. Harold Shedd

== Honors ==
USS General A. W. Greely (AP-141), a 20th-century transport ship operated first by the United States Navy and later the Army and the Military Sea Transportation Service, was named for Greely. Fort Greely, located 100 miles southeast of Fairbanks, Alaska, was named for Greely in 1942. An earlier Fort Greely, also named for Adolphus Greely, was located on Kodiak Island, Alaska. With Kodiak Naval Operating Base and Fort Abercrombie, it is now part of Coast Guard Base Kodiak and one of eight national historic landmarks that commemorate World War II in Alaska.

== Awards ==
=== Military awards ===
- Medal of Honor
- Purple Heart with oak leaf cluster
- Civil War Campaign Medal
- Indian Campaign Medal
- Spanish War Service Medal

Greely received the Medal of Honor in 1935: "For his life of splendid public service, begun on March 27, 1844, having enlisted as a private in the U.S. Army on July 26, 1861, and by successive promotions was commissioned as major general February 10, 1906, and retired by operation of law on his 64th birthday."

Greely was the second person (after Frederick W. Gerber) to receive the award for lifetime achievement rather than for acts of physical courage at the risk of one's own life.

During the Civil War, Greely was wounded twice, once at the Battle of Glendale, and once at the Battle of Antietam. When the Purple Heart was created in 1932, Greely received the medal with an oak leaf cluster in recognition of his wounds.

=== Civilian awards ===
Greely was awarded the Royal Geographical Society's Founder's Medal in 1886. In 1886, Greely also received the Roquette Medal of the Societe de Geographie. His attendance at George V's coronation was commemorated with award of the King George V Coronation Medal. In 1922, he received the American Geographical Society's Charles P. Daly Medal.

== Dates of rank ==
Greely's effective dates of rank were:

- Private, 19th Massachusetts Volunteer Infantry – 26 July 1861
- Corporal – 15 May 1862
- First Sergeant – 1 January 1863
- Second Lieutenant, 81st U.S. Colored Infantry – 18 March 1863
- First Lieutenant – 26 April 1864
- Captain – 4 April 1865
- Brevet Major, United States Volunteers – 13 March 1865
- Second Lieutenant, 36th Infantry – 7 March 1867
- Second Lieutenant, 5th Cavalry – 14 July 1869
- First Lieutenant, 5th Cavalry – 27 May 1873
- Captain, 5th Cavalry – 11 June 1886
- Brigadier General, Chief Signal Officer – 3 March 1887
- Major General – 10 February 1906
- Retired – 27 March 1908

== See also ==
- Greely Island
- List of Medal of Honor recipients during Peacetime

== Works ==
- Three Years of Arctic Service (1886)
- Handbook of Alaska (rev. ed. 1925)
- Reminiscences of Adventure and Service (1927)
- The Polar Regions in the Twentieth Century (1928).
