= Canadian Arctic tundra =

Biogeographic region in Northern Canada

Canadian Arctic Tundra
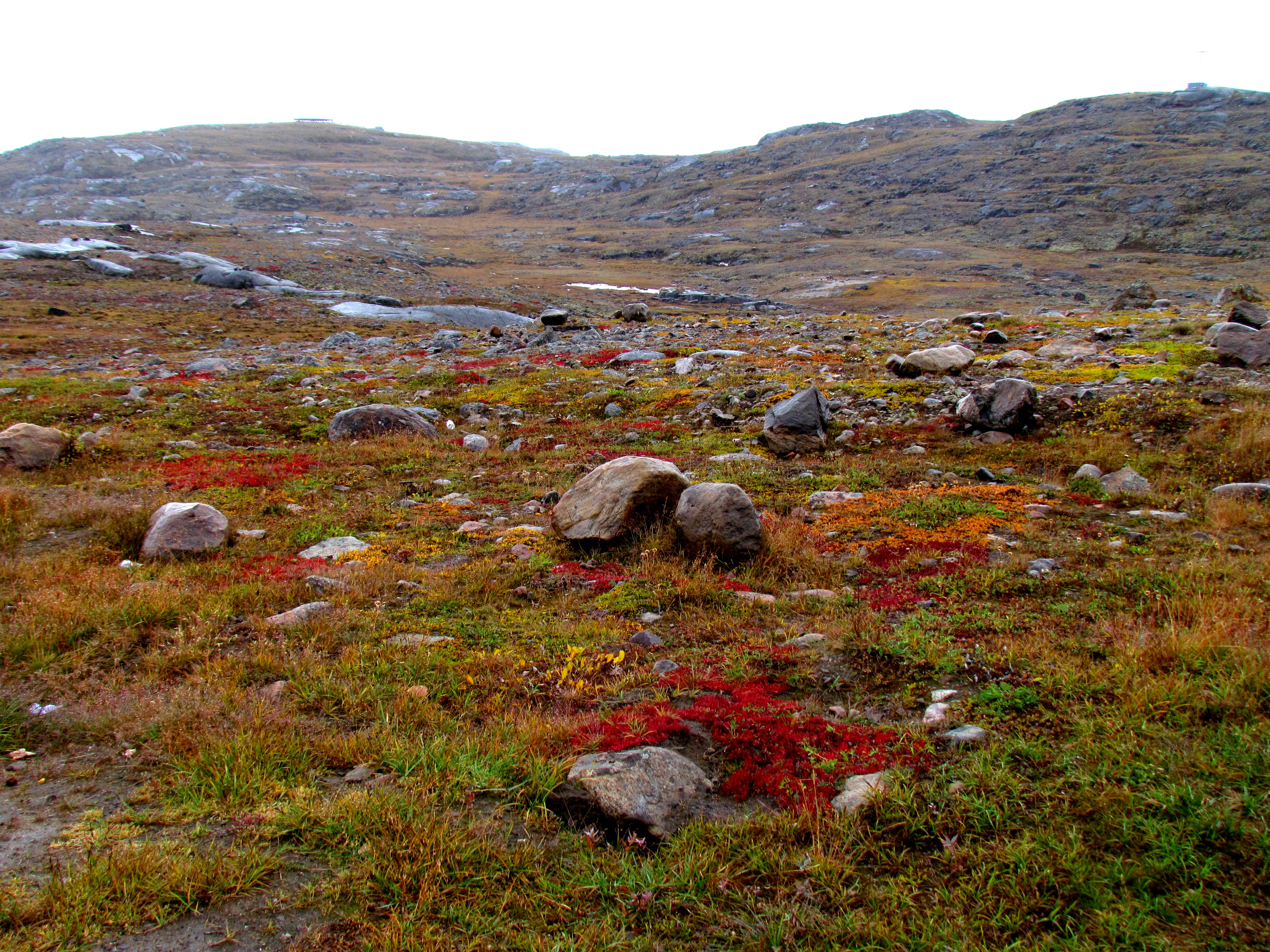
- Tundra in Nunavut

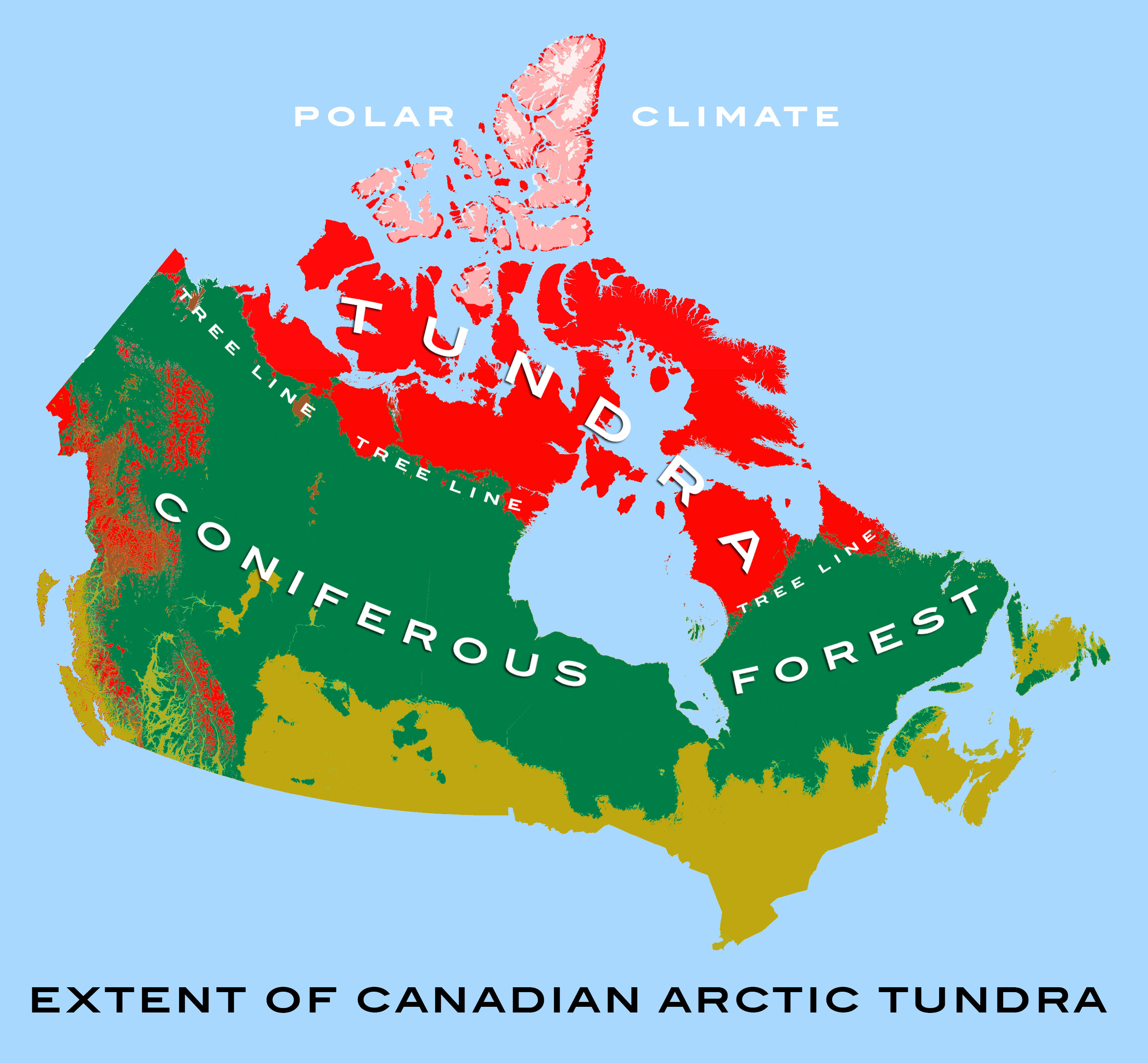
- Canadian Tundra

Ecology
- Realm: Nearctic
- Biome: Tundra
- Animals: Mammals, migratory birds

Geography
- Area: 2,600,000 km^{2} (1,000,000 mi^{2})
- Elevation: max. 2,500 m (8,200 ft)
- Coordinates: 72.8°N 93.6°W
- Oceans or seas: Arctic Ocean (Baffin Bay, Hudson Bay, Beaufort Sea), Atlantic Ocean
- Rivers: Mackenzie River, Back River, Thelon River, Coppermine River
- Climate type: ET
- Soil types: colluvial, morainal, permafrost

Conservation
- Habitat loss: Arctic fox, polar bear, caribou%

The Canadian Arctic tundra is a biogeographic designation for Northern Canada's terrain generally lying north of the tree line or boreal forest, that corresponds with the Scandinavian Alpine tundra to the east and the Siberian Arctic tundra to the west inside the circumpolar tundra belt of the Northern Hemisphere.

Canada's northern territories encompass a total area of 2,600,000 km^{2} (1,000,000 sq mi), 26% of the country's landmass that includes the Arctic coastal tundra, the Arctic Lowlands and the Innuitian Region in the High Arctic. Tundra terrain accounts for approximately 1,420,000 km^{2} (550,000 sq mi) in Yukon, the Northwest Territories, in Nunavut, north-eastern Manitoba, northern Ontario, northern Quebec, northern Labrador and the islands of the Arctic Archipelago, of which Baffin Island with 507,451 km^{2} (195,928 sq mi) is the largest.

Canada's tundra is characterized by extreme climatic conditions with year-round frozen grounds, long and cold winters, a very short growing season and low precipitation rates.

The Canadian Arctic tundra is the traditional home of indigenous peoples, predominately Inuit, who for most of their settlement history occupied the coastal areas of Nunavut, Nunavik (northern Quebec), Nunatsiavut (northern Labrador), the Northwest Territories and formerly in Yukon. Population numbers remain very moderate for the entire region and as of 2006 around 50% of the inhabitants are of indigenous descent.

Changing climate, recorded and documented over several decades has already caused noticeable regional environmental instability and threatened or endangered a number of species.

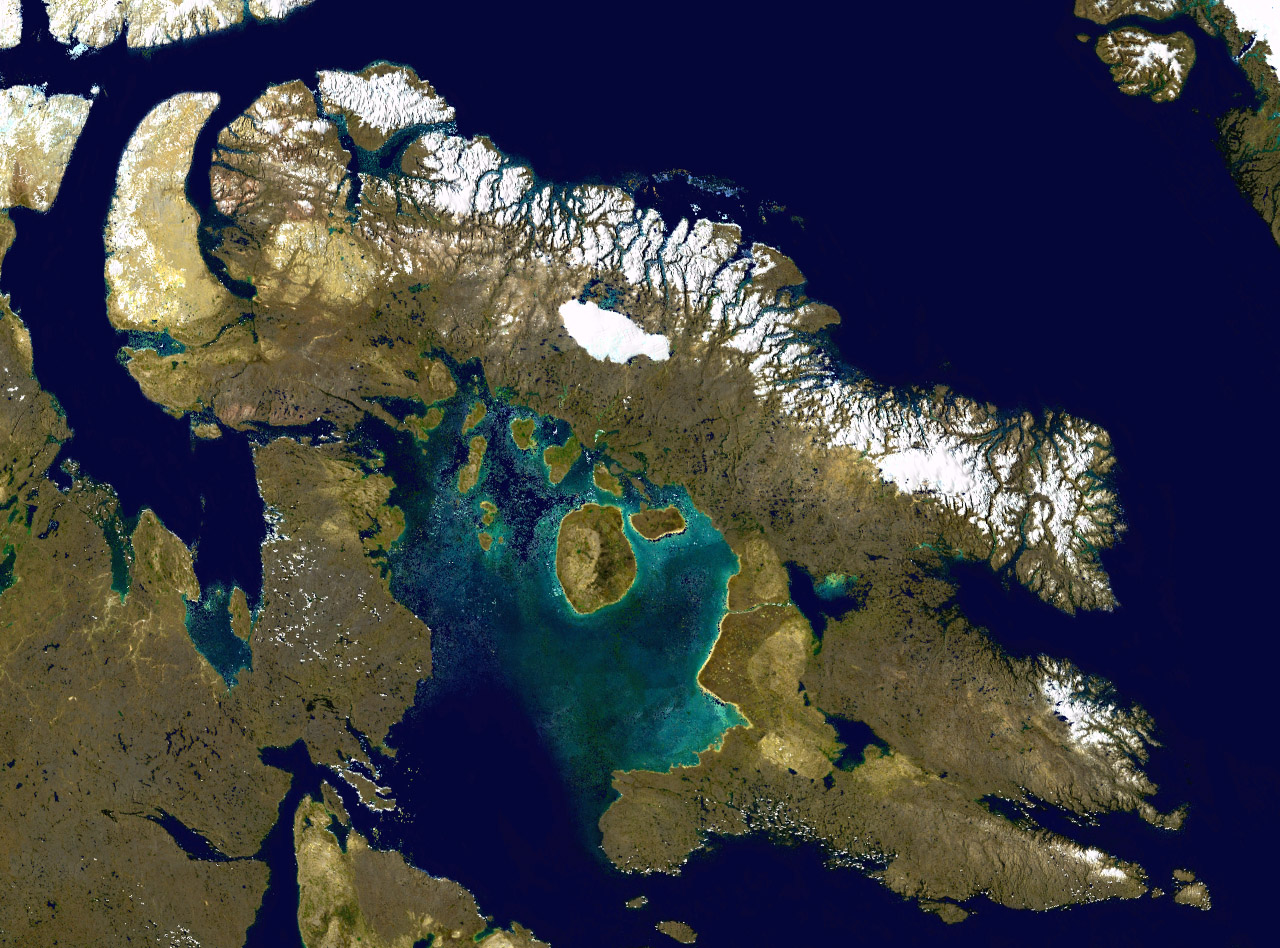
Satellite image of Baffin Island

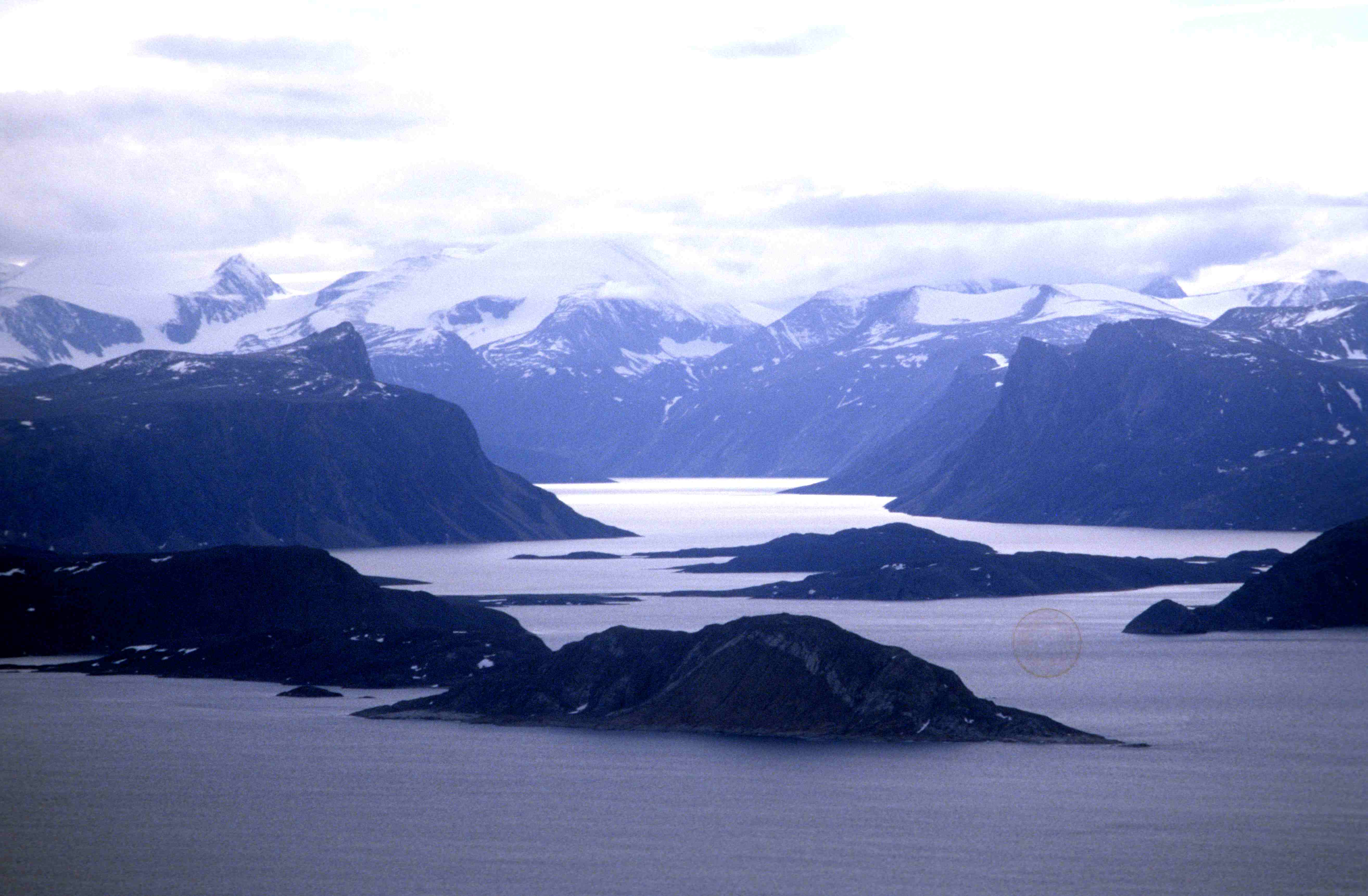
The Baffin Mountains, Auyuittuq National Park

Arctic coastal tundra

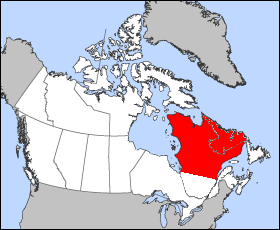
Labrador Peninsula

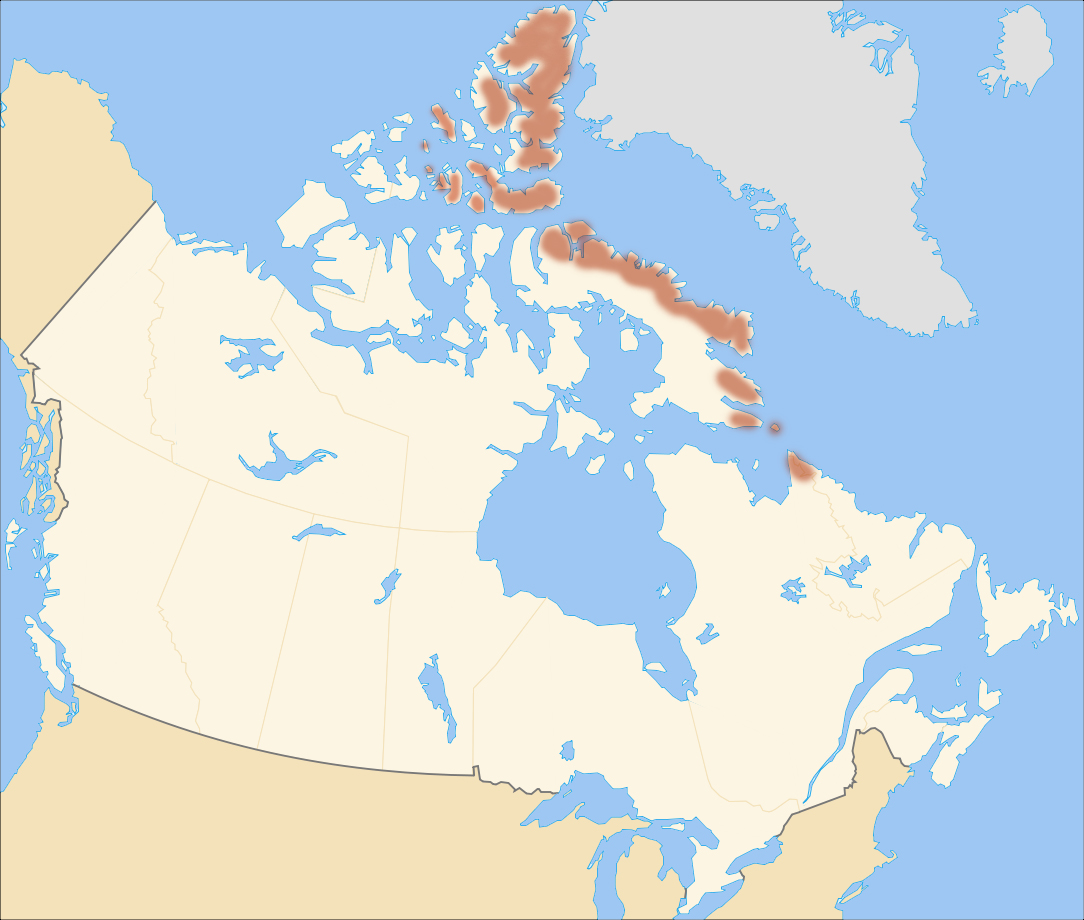
Arctic Cordillera

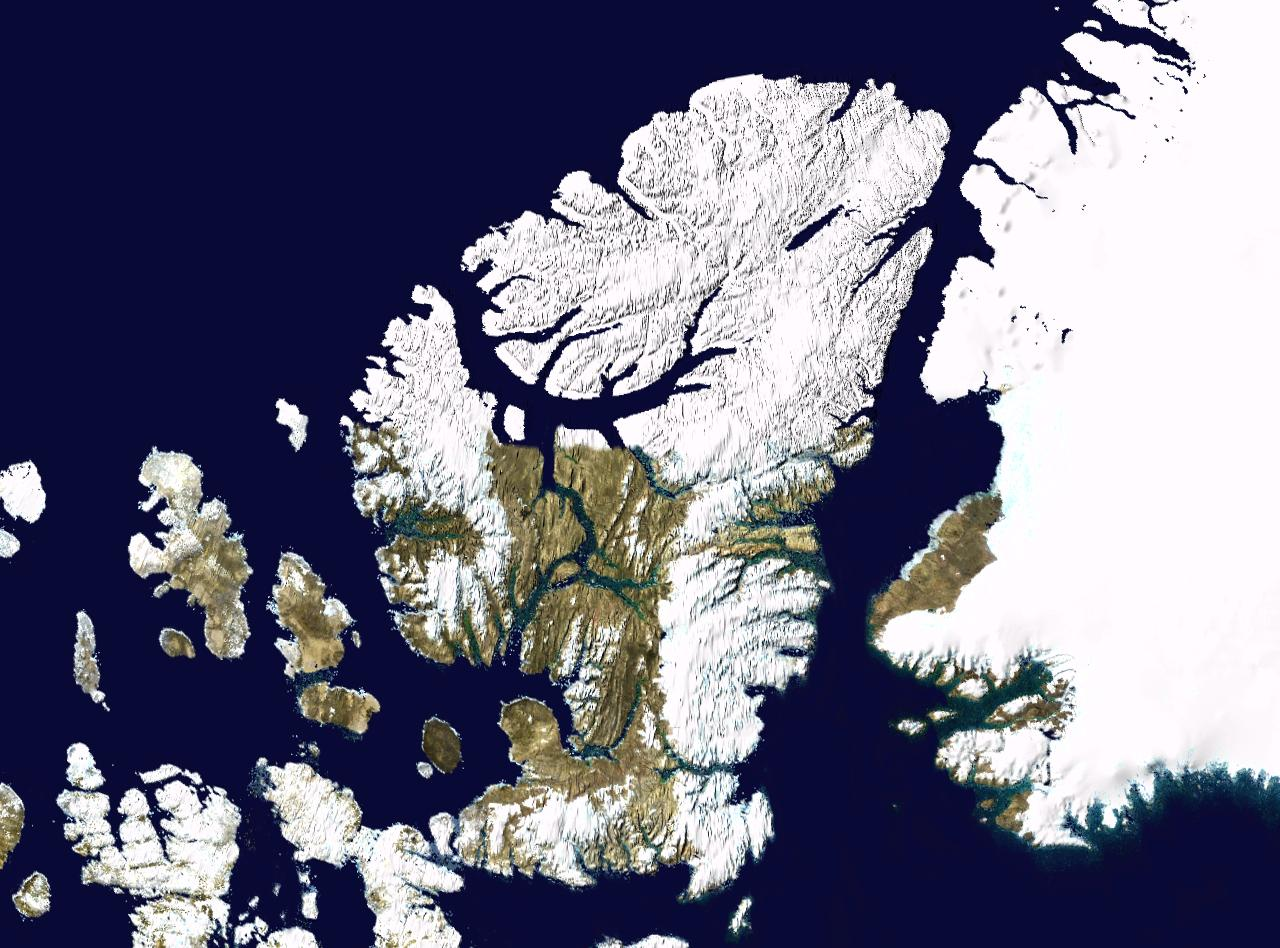
Ellesmere Island part of the Arctic Archipelago

Tundra is predominant in:

1. Canada's northern mainland - the terrain north of the arboreal taiga belt, east and west of Hudson Bay
2. the islands of the Arctic Archipelago - bordered by the Beaufort Sea, Hudson Bay and Baffin Bay

== Coordinates ==
Geographic extremes for Canada's Arctic tundra
North - South maximum latitudinal extent

North: Cape Columbia 83°4′N 74°10′W to South: Flaherty Island 56°37′N 79°12′W

East - West maximum longitudinal extent

East: Baffin Island 66°33′N 61°17′W to West: Herschel Island 69°35′N 139°2′W

== Mainland ==
The northern mainland terrains, the Arctic coastal tundra and the Arctic Lowlands connect with the Alaskan coastal plain to the west and adjoin the coastal tundra of Greenland to the east. Countless lakes, rivers, deltas, marine straits and an extensive, rugged coastline comprise this complex and interdependent patchwork of terrestrial and marine habitats.

== Arctic archipelago ==
The Arctic Archipelago is subdivided into three biogeographical regions with distinctive floral and faunal communities:

- Arctic Cordillera

The Arctic Cordillera is a large, deeply dissected chain of mountain ranges extending along the northeastern flank of the Arctic Archipelago from Ellesmere Island to the north-easternmost part of the Labrador Peninsula in northern Labrador and northern Quebec. The range is characterized by high glaciated peaks and ice caps, that includes Northern Canada's highest point at Barbeau Peak, reaching 2,616 m (8,583 ft). The high elevations of this ecoregion is a Polar desert as lower elevated plains are dominated by patches of lichen and moss.

- Northern Arctic

It contains the northern edges of the Northwest Territories, Nunavut and much of the island plateaus, such as the Parry and Lancaster island plateaus. Extending over most of the archipelago, this is the coldest and driest part of Canada. Lichens and herbs dominate in dry tundra interspersed with wetland species.

- Southern Arctic

It comprises areas on the mainland - the southern half of Nunavut and the Northwest territories and stretches down into Quebec, Hudson Bay, the Ungava Peninsula and includes the Aberdeen and Amundsen Plains. Dominant features are hills and plains, ponds and lakes that allow growth of low shrubs mixed with herbs, lichens, and cotton-grass. Stunted Krummholz trees grow along the major river valleys.

For almost a million square kilometres, the pattern of habitats in the Southern Arctic is the same: sprawling shrublands, wet sedge meadows, and cold, clear lakes. Superimposed on this pattern are the fascinating shapes and textures created by intense frost action in the soil.

The Southern Arctic is the region of transition from the treeless Arctic tundra to the conifer forests. dwarf birch and Arctic willow are among the common shrub species, along with heaths, herbaceous plants, and lichens. Where nutrients and moisture are available along the rivers and streams, scattered clumps of stunted spruce trees grow. Sedges and mosses thrive in the wetlands of the lowland areas of this ecoregion and provide nesting sites for birds. Vegetation is most dense in sheltered areas and depressions, where there is less wind and more moisture.

== Arctic forest tundra transition zone ==
Canada's 4,800 km (3,000 mi) long tree line is a spatially inconsistent structure. Often several alternating vegetation patches are found in a Vegetation Tension Zone. The entire range greatly varies in width and widens markedly in the east, particularly in the region of the Hudson Bay. Local soil, elevation and drainage quality are influential factors for the growth of the transition, some scholars also pointed to "differences in albedo and snow retention caused by the presence of certain coniferous trees".

== Geological setting ==
Barren Grounds and tundra are shown in light blue, and the taiga and boreal forest in dark blue

Northern Canada's present physiognomy formed beginning around 750 to 600 million years ago by the breakup and subsequent rifting of the supercontinent Rodinia. The subsequent geological sequence has since created a recent physiography that divides into the regions listed below.

- Canadian Shield
- Interior Platform
- Appalachian Orogen
- Innuitian Orogeny
- Cordillera and Western Canada Sedimentary Basin

Canada's tundra runs more or less over all physiographic divisions except the Appalachian Orogen. As these formations are of deep tectonic nature they do not necessarily constitute the structure and material found on the surface, are observable elevated mountain ranges or orogenic belts. Large areas of the Canadian Shield - the ancient geological core of the North American continental plate are buried under sedimentary rocks of the Interior Platform. Repeated glaciations have had a profound impact on shaping land forms and determining drainage patterns.

=== Surface geology and permafrost ===
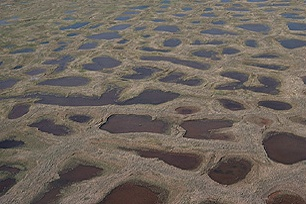
Patterned ground

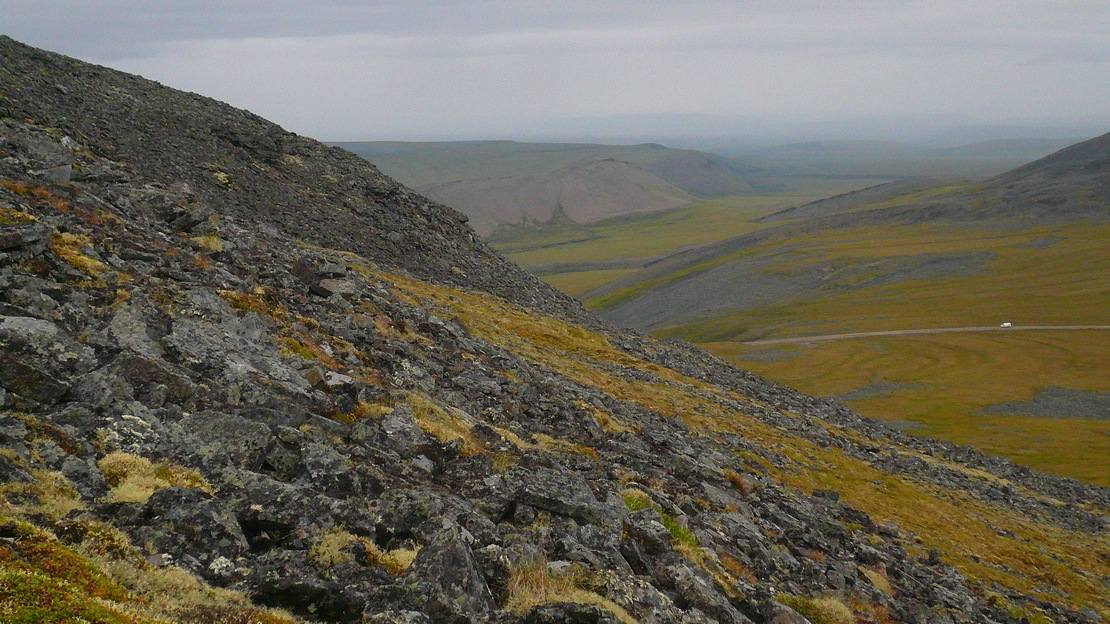
Richardson Mountains

Permafrost, the dominant natural phenomenon of the tundra is of fundamental significance for this unique ecosystem, as it commands the tundra's climate, wild life, ecology, drainage and soils. Definition: "Permafrost is soil, rock or sediment that is frozen for more than two consecutive years."

Recognized classification for the Northern Hemisphere regions in which permafrost occurs, on approximately 25% of the land area (23,000,000 km^{2} (8,900,000 sq mi)).

- continuous permafrost (underlying 90 to 100% of the landscape)
- discontinuous permafrost (50 to 90%)
- sporadic permafrost (0 to 50%)

In the discontinuous and sporadic zones permafrost distribution is complex and patchy, and permafrost-free terrain is common. The depth of permafrost varies from less than one meter to more than 1,500 m (4,900 ft). Patterned ground - large polygonal ground patterns and ice wedges caused by frost over a long period of time are common throughout the region except for areas of solid bedrock.

=== Surface ===
The Arctic Cordillera peaks at over 2,000 m (6,600 ft), topped with extensive glaciers. There are nunataks, ice fields and deeply cut valleys, a rugged coastline with long winding fjords and large areas of exposed bedrock. Lowland soils consist of loose rocky, sandy, colluvial and morainal material.

The lowland plains of the western mainland Arctic are covered with Pleistocene materials and outcrops of Paleozoic and Mesozoic sediments. East of the Prince of Wales and Somerset islands, Precambrian granite bedrock surfaces.

The Southern Arctic sits on Precambrian granitic bedrock outcrops, followed in the west by Cretaceous shales from the Great Bear Lake to the Firth River, Yukon. The undulating landscape has innumerable lakes, ponds and wetlands and stratified sediments up to 100 km (62 mi) long. Seasonally frozen top layers vary in depth as differences in moisture give rise to a variety of land forms and habitats.

=== Soils ===
The active top layer of most southern and central soil profiles is only seasonally frozen, contains water, gases and nutrients, its depth varies depending on material, vegetative cover and the local temperature. Permafrost acts "through physical and chemical processes in the top layer which operate as thermal and hydrological gradients". Soils of the southern terrain consist of various glacial deposits. Finely-textured marine sediments dominate the soils of the coastal regions.

== Climate and biotope ==
=== Characteristics ===
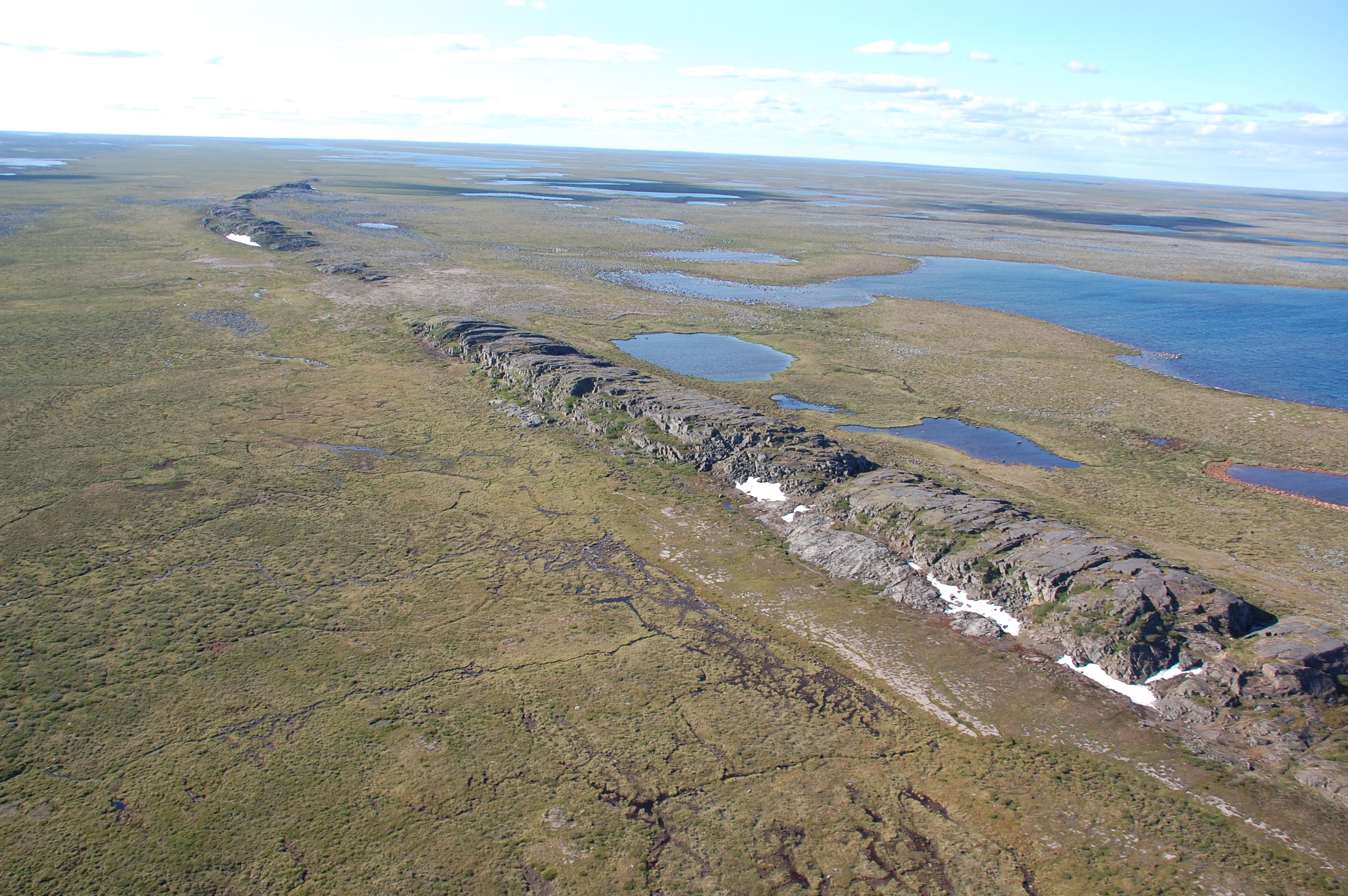
Dyke in the Kivalliq Region, Nunavut

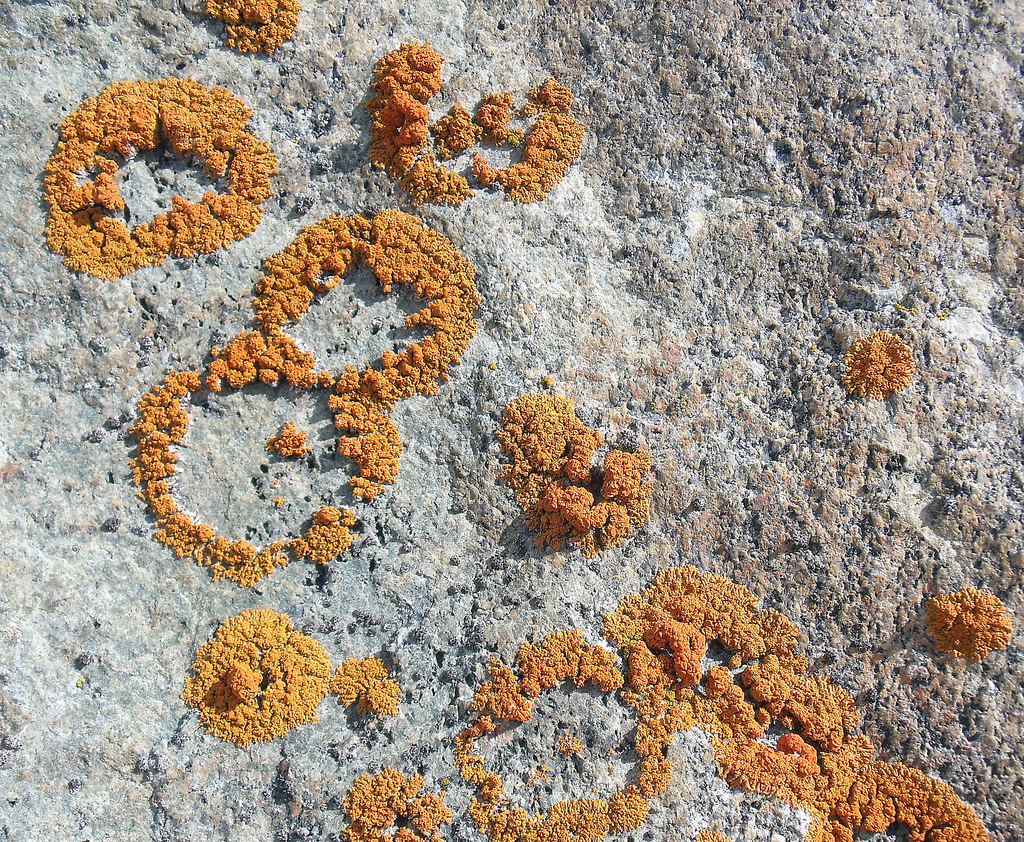
Lichen on rock, Nunavut

Harsh environmental and weather conditions, slow growth and decomposition, poor soils, sparse resources and nutrients, low variety of land forms favour highly adapted and migratory life forms. Diversity of species is only seasonal and habitat sustainability is usually confined to brief periods of appropriate conditions. Hundreds of species of flowering plants are documented. Yet these are organisms with a short life cycle that reproduce by budding and division rather than by interaction with insects. The mid-summer growing season with up to 24 hours of sun lasts for 50 to 60 days. The average precipitation is 4.5 in (110 mm) per season. The tundra classifies as a desert due to low precipitation rates, yet permafrost causes even lower degrees of drainage and evaporation and as a result the ground, lakes and glaciers hold large quantities of fresh water.

Prolonged periods without sun light, frozen ground and strong winds also prevent substantial tree growth. Lichen, uniquely adapted, and does not rely on roots and soil for growth is one of the most notable, widespread and enduring organisms of the tundra. A symbiotic life form with a photobiont (algae or cyanobacteria) living among the filaments of a fungus where it benefits from moisture, elementary nutrients and is protected from the environment. The photobiont's photosynthetic processes in turn generate organic carbon sugars that feed the fungus.

=== Temperatures ===
Midsummer shade temperatures peak at 30 °C (86 °F) on the continent beyond the Arctic Circle, and in winter the temperature drops below −50 °C (−58 °F). In the Arctic Archipelago average midsummer temperatures are lower than 10 °C (50 °F). Differences between soil surface and air temperatures can be considerable and are largely influenced by direct insolation and wind velocity.

== Wildlife ==
=== Pleistocene migrations ===
Beringia land bridge

During the Pleistocene, Beringia a land bridge existed (from 70,000 to 60,000 and 30,000 to 11,000 years ago) between Alaska and Siberia. This corridor offered an opportunity for the interchange of fauna between Asia and the Americas. At the same time, these land masses provided ice-free terrain for mammals on which they could settle and reproduce - called Wisconsin refuge.

Beringia is also one of the main migration routes of paleo-humans into North America including the Paleo-Eskimo communities of Alaska, Greenland and the Canadian Arctic.

=== Flora ===
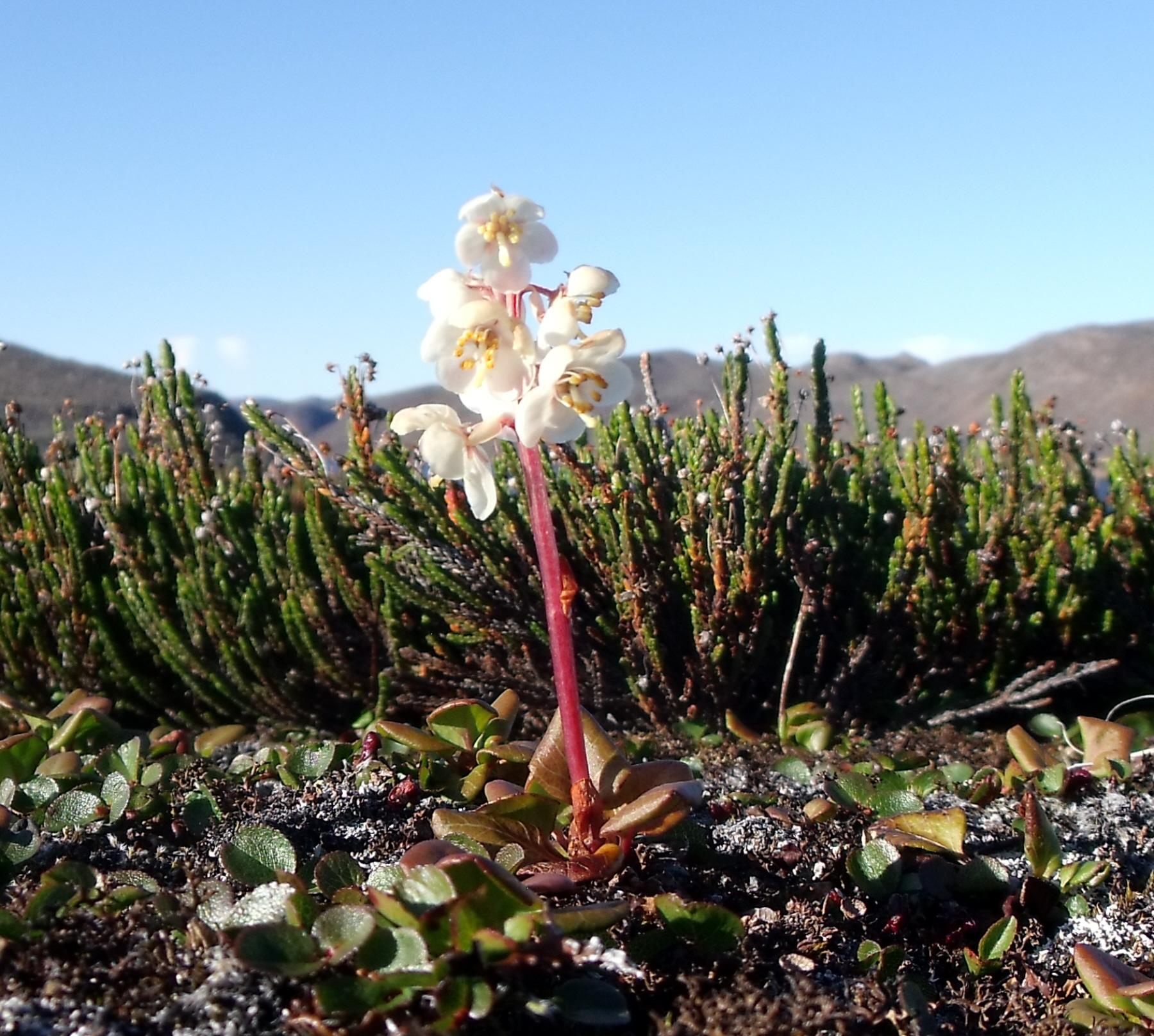
Pyrola grandiflora (largeflowered wintergreen)

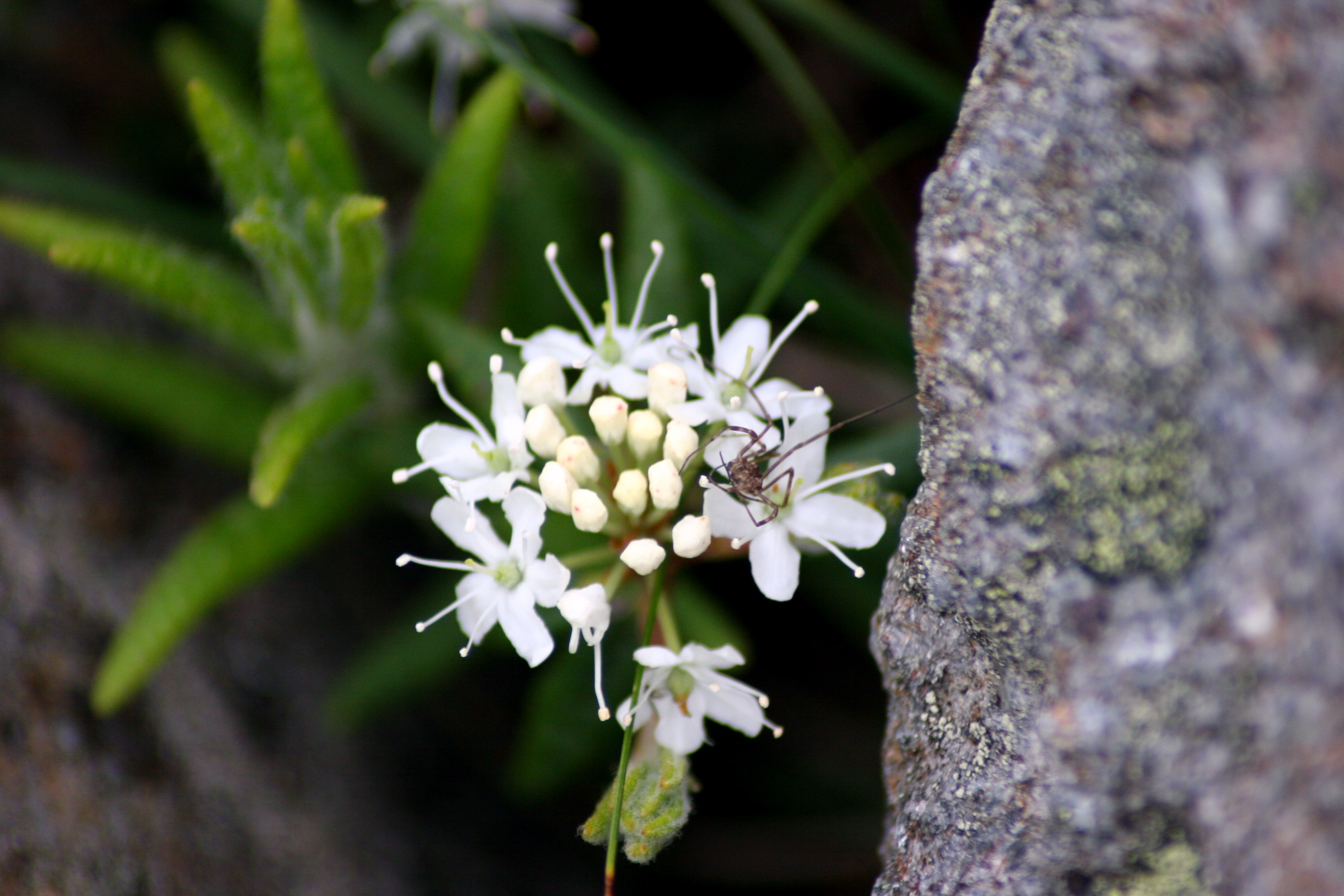
Labrador tea

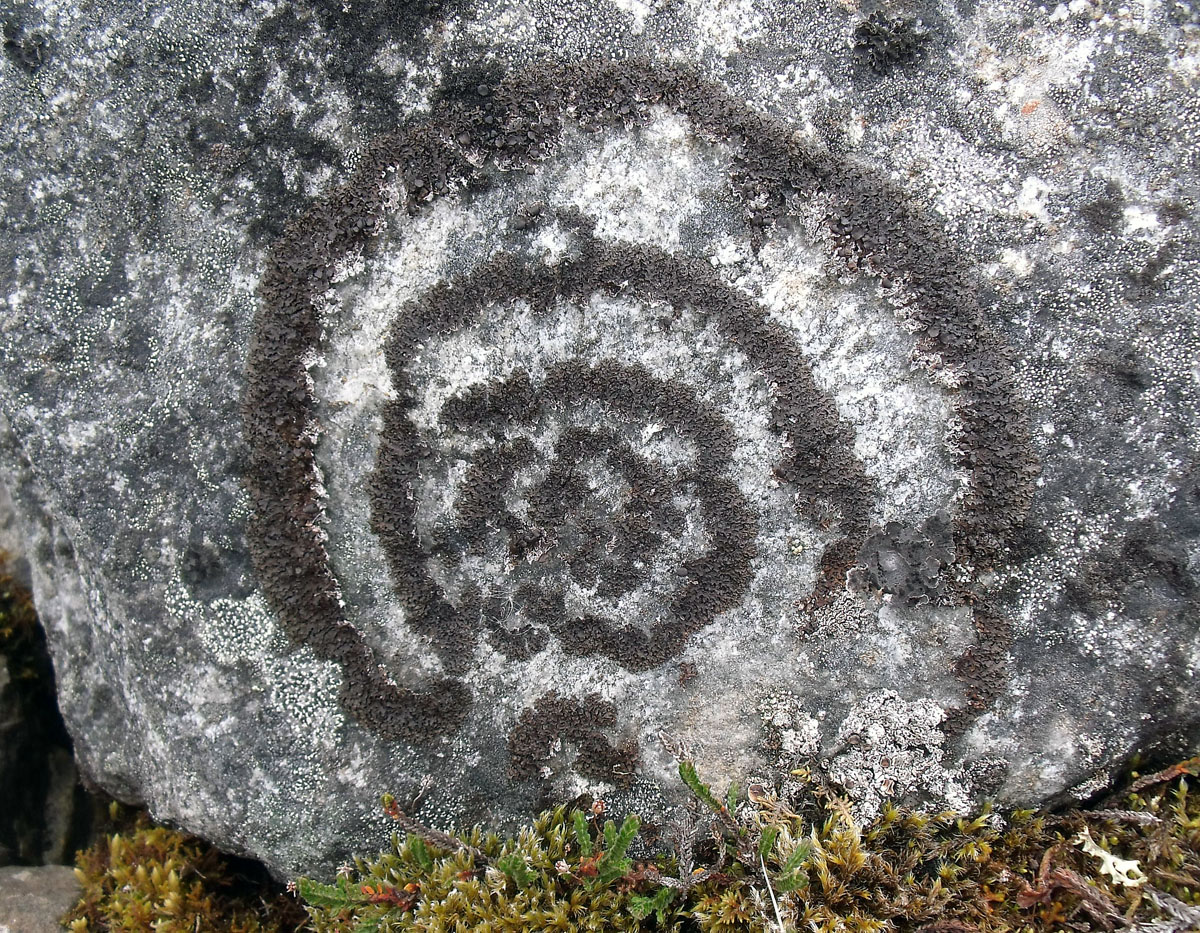
Lichen, Nunavut

The flora of the Canadian Arctic is characterized by low species diversity, low endemism and high resistance towards introduced species, attributed to more recent glaciation, in comparison to other Arctic regions, such as the Siberian tundra. The southern edge of the Canadian Arctic tundra is met by an arboreal tree line - the Arctic forest-tundra transition zone.

In order to adapt to the extreme conditions of the Arctic, plants have:

- reduced leaf size to minimize water loss to wind
- fuzzy hair-like structures or alternatively grow in mats to protect themselves from snow and wind damage
- often extensive root systems to store nutrients for the long and harsh winter months.

On the northernmost area of the Canadian Arctic tundra, the Arctic Cordillera the features of a Polar desert dominate on the highlands and in the interior, covered in ice and snow or just exposed bare bedrock and little vegetation is found. Typically, only patches of moss, lichen, Arctic poppy (Papaver radicatum) and cold-hardy vascular plants such as sedge and cotton grass are found.

Recent records have identified around 400 species of vascular plants in the region, represented in 42 families and 141 genera of plants. Of the approximately 106 endemic vascular plant species of the region, 34 different species have been identified in central Northern Canada, 20 in the Hudson Bay - Labrador area and 28 on Ellesmere Island. Some endemic plants, such as the Yukon Whitlow-grass (Draba yukonensis) and the Long's northern rockcress (Braya longyi) have become endangered due to industrial activities. In a 2008 expedition to south-west Victoria Island 204 species of vascular plants were recorded and more than 800 species were identified for the region.

On the southern islands of the Arctic Archipelago patches of low-lying and dwarf versions of arctic deciduous and evergreen shrubs are identified. In certain regions - such as Nunavut, the Baffin Uplands and the Lancaster Plateaus - Arctic willow (Salix arctica), purple saxifrage (Saxifraga oppositifolia) and Kobresia simpliciuscula are also common. Other species found include the northern Labrador tea, Vaccinium ssp., foxtail grass and Luzula multiflora. In the Southern Arctic tundra, shrubs are more regular, consisting of dwarf birch, Arctic willow, northern Labrador tea, Dryas spp., and Vaccinium ssp. In waterlogged areas, moss, willow and sedge cover is substantial.

Invasive species, such as the Kentucky blue grass, orchids, Red fescue and flax proved to be unsuccessful. Some exceptions are the common dandelion (Taraxacum officinale), which since its introduction to the region has proliferated on beaches and shores and near newly opened roads on Baffin Island, Barley (Hordeum vulgare), shepherd's purse (Capsella bursa-pastoris) and the opium poppy (Papaver somniferum). (Note: This only applies to the common dandelion. Other species of Taraxacum are native to the Canadian Arctic tundra)

=== Fauna ===
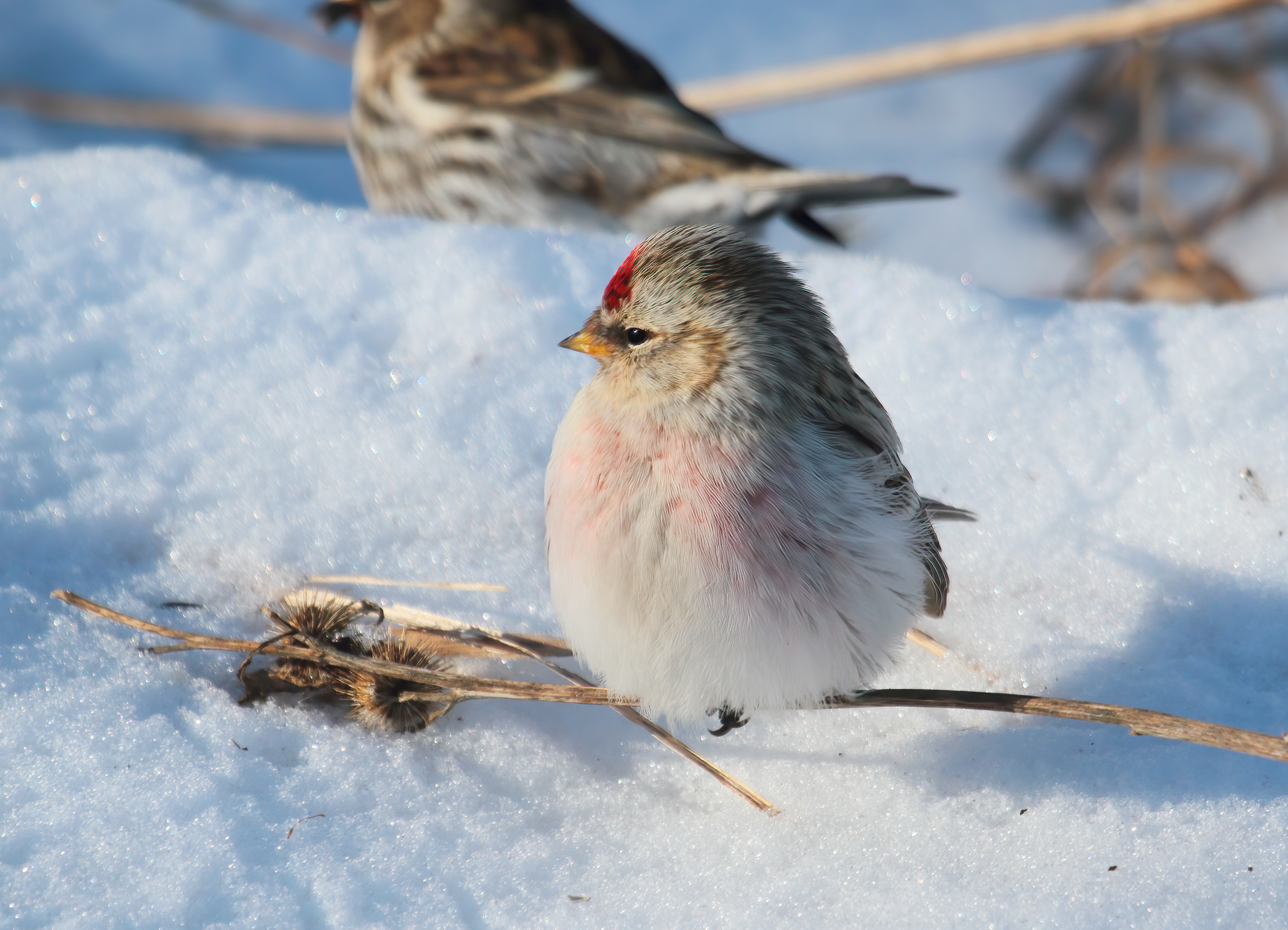
Arctic redpoll (Acanthis hornemanni)

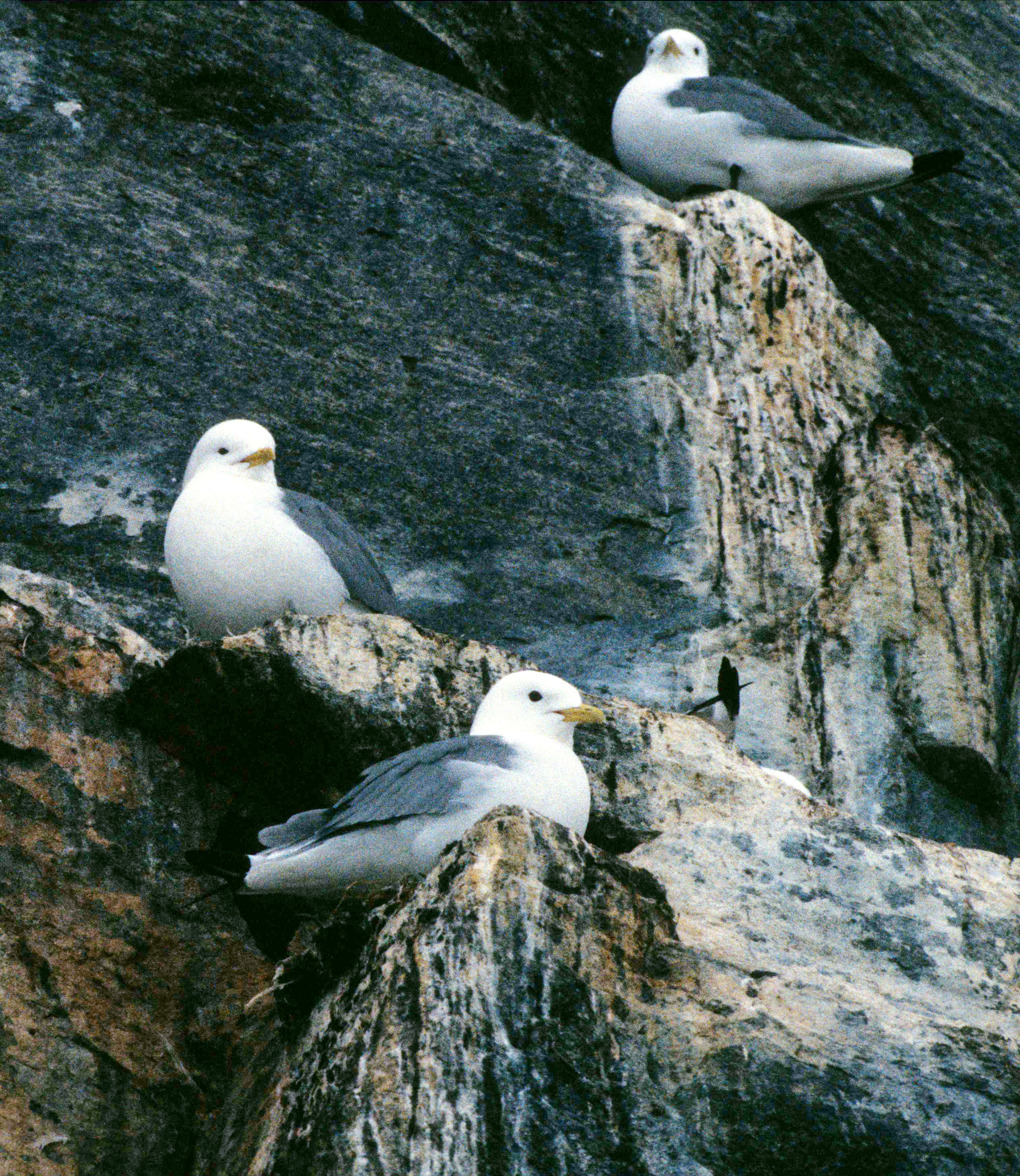
Black-legged kittiwakes (Rissa tridactyla), Bylot Island at Baffin Bay

During the brief Arctic summer, migratory birds - ducks, geese, shore birds, jaegers (skua), gulls, terns, songbirds, owls and others nest in the mosaic of habitats provided by the tundra. The snowy owl (Nyctea scandiaca) and the common raven (Corvus corax) live in the Arctic tundra year-round.

Most recent mammal species have a greatly varied evolutionary history:

- Mammals that lived on the land masses of Northern Canada, able to survive in the polar deserts are the polar bear (Ursus maritimus), and the Arctic fox (Vulpes lagopus). Recent statistics show there are 26,000 polar bears worldwide, of which two of the three largest sub-populations are found in the Canadian Arctic. The Arctic fox is abundant today throughout the Canadian Arctic with a population of approximately 100,000 individuals. Arctic foxes in northern regions such as Ellesmere Island have a diet consisting mainly of lemmings.
- Mammal species that existed on the tundra before the Beringia land bridge are the Arctic hare (Lepus arcticus) and diverse lemming species (Dicrostonyx spp.) and muskox (Ovibus moschatus).
- Mammals absent from the tundra before the Beringia land bridge but widespread in other parts of North Canada are the boreal woodland caribou (Rangifer tarandus), Arctic wolf (Canis lupus arctos) and ermine or stoat (Mustela ermine). Approximately, 3 million caribou are found in the Canadian Arctic. There is a dynamic relationship between the caribou and wolves, as the caribou is the main and practically exclusive source of food for wolves.
- Mammals living in open habitats with forest, that continued breeding during the Beringia land bridge consist of the masked shrew (Sorex cinereus) and the northern red-backed vole (Myodes rutilus).
- Mammals that lived in open habitats with forests. The red fox (Vulpes vulpes) and wolverine (Gulo gulo) originated in forests and are still expanding their territory in northern Canada.
- Mammals now common on the tundra but not existent before the Beringia land bridge occurred. These mammals consist of the Arctic ground squirrel (Spermophilus parryii) and North American brown lemming (Lemmus trimucronatus).
- Migrating mammals from Eurasia that crossed the Beringia land bridge and adapted to the tundra climate and environment. These mammals consist of the brown bear (Ursus arctos), including the grizzly bear (Ursus arctos horribilis.), and the tundra vole (Microtus oeconomus).

Notable marine species include the narwhal (Monodon monoceros), the Greenland shark (Somniosus microcephalus), the walrus (Odobenus rosmarus) and the ringed seal (Pusa hispida).

Insect species include the Bombus polaris and Bombus hyperboreus (Arctic bumblebees), the mosquito, the hoverfly and the black fly.

Invasive species include the cabbage white butterfly (Pieris rapae), common starling (Sturnus vulgaris) and the house sparrow (Passer domesticus).

== Human population ==
The Canadian Arctic tundra was first colonized by indigenous peoples, of which the Inuit today are descendants. In the late 17th century European colonization of the region began. French and British merchants arrived and subsequently settled in the Canadian Arctic and dominated the fur trade. In doing this, the merchants established trade centres which grew into small villages. Over the years, the villages grew but remained primitive and self-sufficient, dependent on local resources. In 2011, the north of Canada corresponding to the Canadian Arctic had a population of 107,265 people and a population density of 0.03 inhabitants per square kilometre.

According to Natural Resources Canada (2001), the health status of Canadians living in the Arctic is significantly lower than that of the rest of the country. Life expectancy is low and infant mortality rates are high, especially in Nunavut. The health of the indigenous peoples in Northern Canada is much worse compared to non-Aboriginals in the same area. Many indigenous peoples in Canada's North have a lower socioeconomic status that has significant implications for health and well-being. Suicide rates, lung cancer, drowning rates and the number of deaths by accident are high. Due to the self-sufficient lifestyle in the Arctic, a large amount of time is spent hunting, fishing and gathering other food sources, which makes motor vehicle accidents in hazardous terrain common.

== Climate change ==
Map of Canada showing the increases in GHG emissions by province/territory in 2008, compared to the 1990 base year. 50%+ increase 30%-50% increase 20%-30% increase 10%-20% increase 0%-10% increase 0%-10% decrease Each square represents 2 tonnes CO_{2} eq. per capita

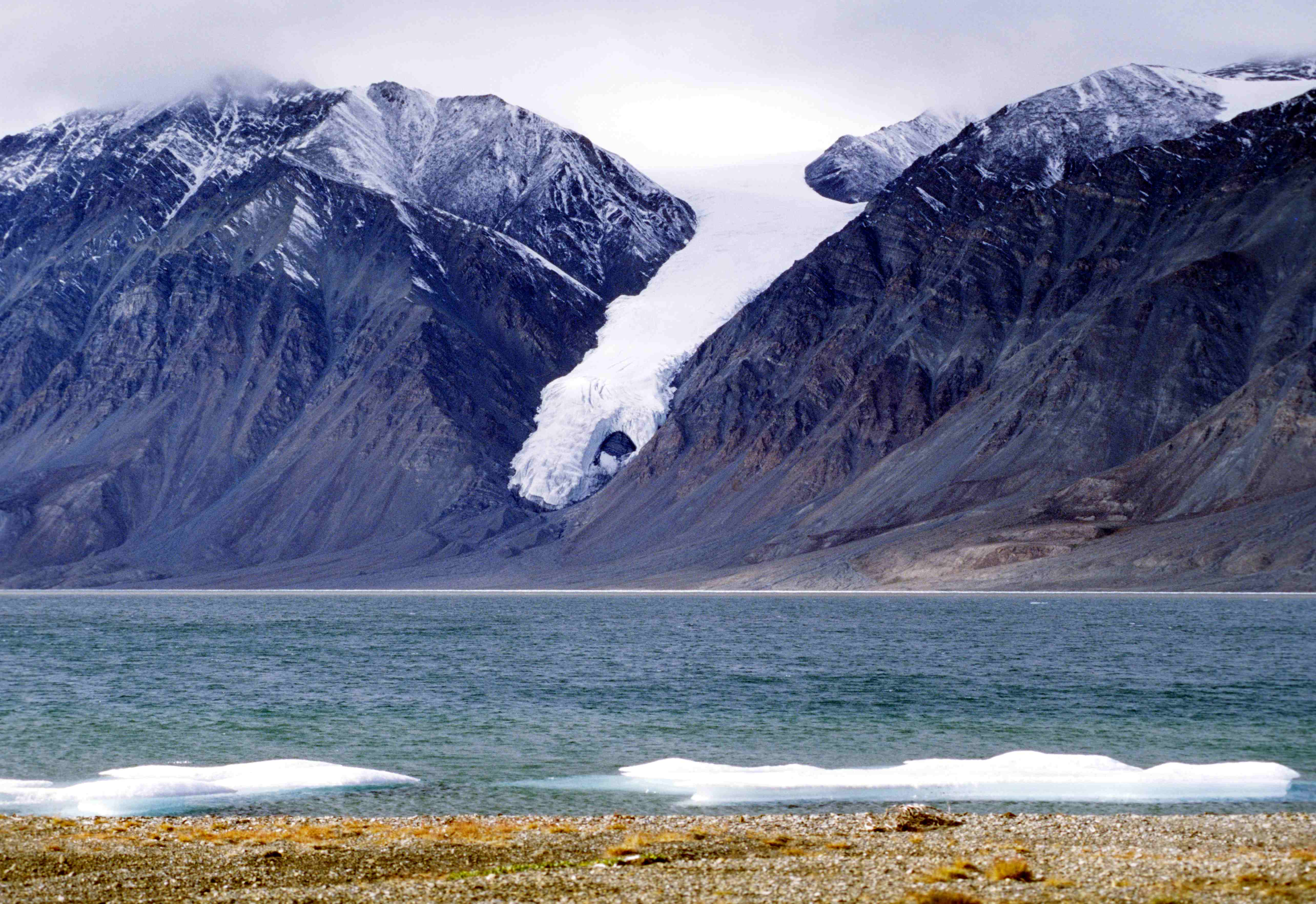
Gull Glacier in Tanquary Fiord

=== Assessment ===
The Arctic is now experiencing some of the most rapid and severe climate change on Earth. Over the next 100 years, climate change is expected to accelerate, contributing to major physical, ecological, social, and economic changes, many of which have already begun. Changes in arctic climate will also affect the rest of the world through increased global warming and rising sea levels. Climate change is taking place within the context of many other ongoing changes in the Arctic, including the observed increase in chemical contaminants entering the Arctic from other regions, overfishing, land use changes that result in habitat destruction and fragmentation, rapid growth in the human population, and cultural, governance, and economic changes.

The Canadian Arctic shows a decrease of snow coverage, glacier formation, permafrost and ice caps; increase in temperature; increase in precipitation; and, shrinking of lakes and wetlands over the past few decades. Additionally, gradual movement of the boreal forest – tundra transition zone in a northward direction is occurring and is expected to continue.

During the last 20 to 50 years the Canadian Arctic has experienced as much as 1 °C (1.8 °F) temperature increase per decade. Rising temperatures are most pronounced in western Canada and Alaska during the winter, where temperatures have risen by 3 to 4 °C (5.4 to 7.2 °F) during the last half century. In the northern Ellesmere Island region, the mean daily air temperature is merely above 0 °C (32 °F) from June until August, however during August 2008 the daily maximum reached 19.8 °C (67.6 °F). A record of 20.5 °C (68.9 °F) was achieved in the area. The local population has observed climate change of the Canadian Arctic, such as "a significant thinning of sea- and freshwater ice, a shortening of the winter ice season, reduction in snow cover, changes in wildlife and plant species’ distribution, melting permafrost, and increased coastal erosion of some shorelines"

The combination of rain and snow on the Arctic terrain has been damaging for plants. The water penetrates the protective layer of snow over plants and hence, the likelihood of the water freezing and forming crystals in the plant increases. At Old Crow, Yukon considerable lowering of water levels was observed and a significant increase in shrub cover, especially those belonging to the Salix genus. Researchers reported peak annual greenness increases of 0.49 to 0.79% per year in dwarf shrubs, mosses and lichens of the Northern Arctic. Peak annual greenness increases of 0.46 to 0.67% were recorded in the Southern Arctic, mainly attributed to an increase in sedges and erect dwarf shrubs.

Satellite imaging of spring snow cover duration (number of days with snow depth >2 centimetres from February to July) has recorded, over the 1971 to 2008 period, on average decreases of 3.3 to 2.8 days of snow per decade in the Canadian Arctic. This earlier snow melt has led to decreases between 14% and 46% of snow cover extent in the Canadian Arctic. These decreases correspond to the 1967 to 2008 period from May to June. Additionally, Yukon glaciers have lost 22% of their surface area (a total loss of 2,541 ± 189 km^{2}) over the last 50 years, corresponding to a total mass loss of 406 ± 177 Gigatonnes (equivalent to 1.13 ± 0.49 millimeter of global sea level rise).

Rainfall in the Canadian Arctic has increased by more than 20% in the last decades. However, the degree of rainfall increase is subject to variation from one location to the next. For example, in Resolute, Nunavut in the period of 1948 to 2007, there was a 48% increase in rainfall recorded with an average of 13.6 mm (0.54 in) of rain per decade.

=== Government action ===
"The Government of Canada is committed to working with international partners to reach an ambitious global agreement this is anchored in science and leads the world towards a low-carbon, climate resilient economy."

- Collaborating with Provinces and Territories
- Investing in Clean Energy and Clean Technology
- Youth engagement
- Paris Agreement

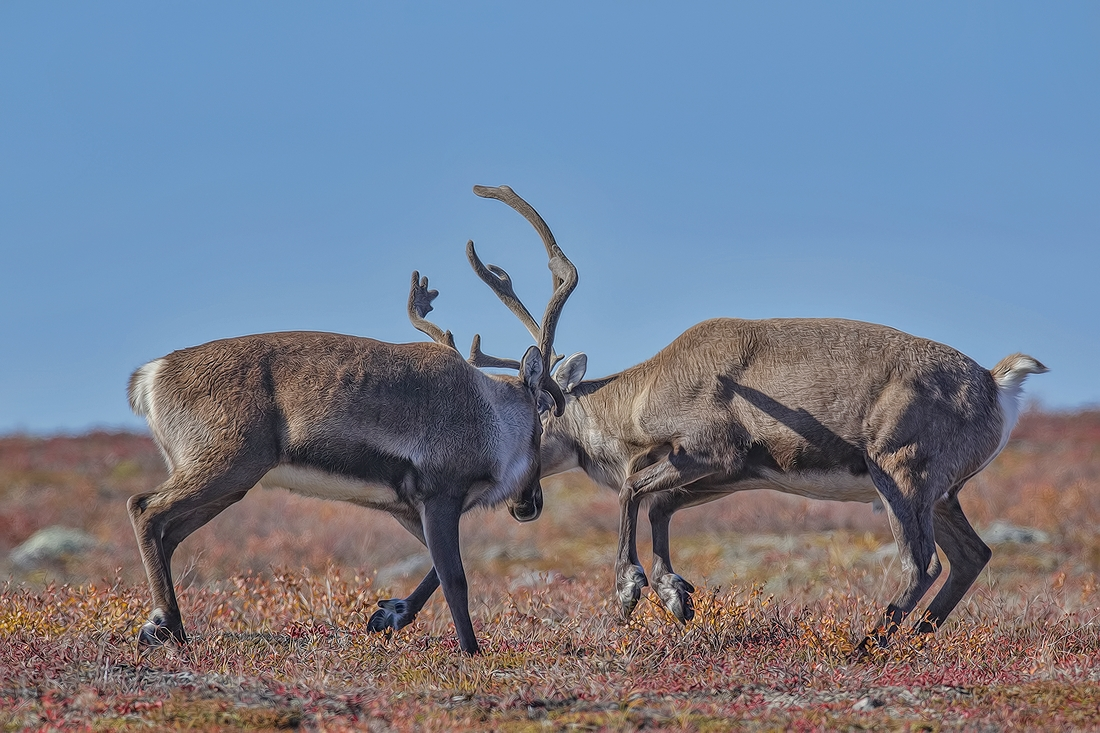
Rutting Barren-ground caribou, North Arm, Ennadai Lake, near the Kazan River, Nunavut

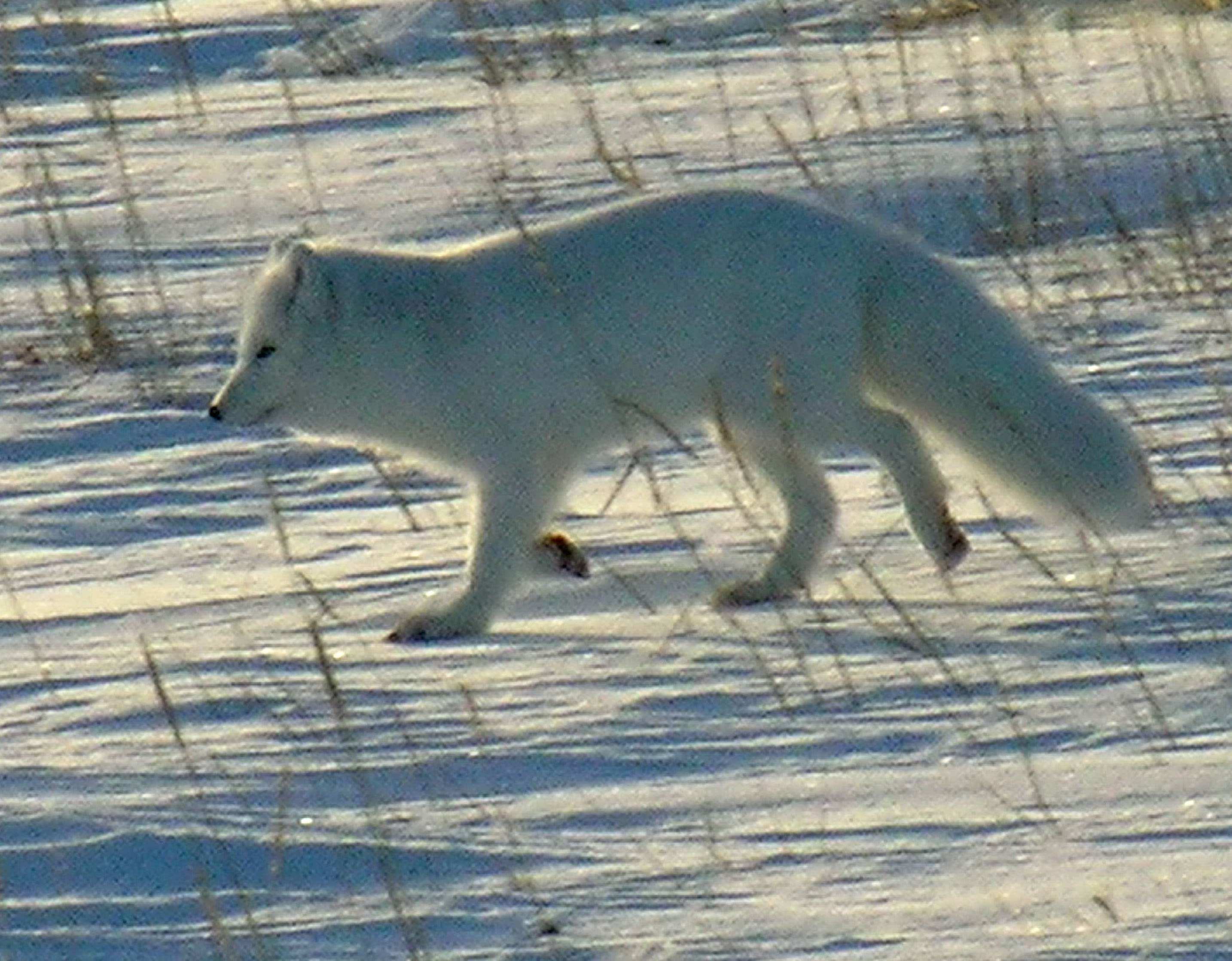
Arctic fox

== Projected effects of climate change on native species ==
=== Caribou ===
A publication of the U.S. National Park Service concludes that the native caribou will be affected by increasing climate change in the Canadian Arctic. Rising temperatures account for decreasing access opportunities to lichen, the caribou's primary food source in their winter harvest. While there is going to be an increase of dense shrubs, the species tends to avoid such plants due to the threat of wolf predation. It is expected the caribou will likely not choose to feed on these shrubs. In addition, the higher wind rates have already affected the caribou population, because increased wind rates causes snow to harden. Snow hardening makes it difficult for caribou to roam along their typical migration patterns and access to lichen buried in snow is more difficult.

=== Arctic Fox ===
The Arctic fox (Vulpes lagopus) - a highly adapted species is one of the land-dwelling predators of the Arctic region. Its physiognomy fits with the greyish-white background patterns of the local tundra and mountain habitats. Thick fur, specialized ‘heat-retaining’ circulatory systems in their feet and an ability to lower their metabolic rate are traits that are rather disadvantageous in warmer non-polar habitats. Survival and successful reproduction in any other biome are unlikely.

The species is regarded a prime indicator of the overall health of the tundra, its sensitivity makes it an indicator species (an organism whose presence, absence or abundance - among others - reflects the health, environmental conditions and integrity of a specific habitat). An IUCN study argues that persistent global warming is going to have severe consequences for the species' future.

- Habitat loss

As new plant species from the south invade the region large extents of former tundra habitat are going to be replaced by arboreal forest.

- Competition

Competition with the resilient red fox (Vulpes vulpes), who is a superior hunter and known to prey on Arctic foxes.

- Population collapse of prey species.

Climate change will lead to instabilities in the population sizes of lemmings, voles and other important prey species.

== Bibliography ==
- Angerbjorn, A., Hersteinsson, P., & Tannerfeldt, M. (2004). Arctic fox (Alopex lagopus). In C. Sillero-Zubiri, M. Hoffmann, & D. Macdonald (Eds.), Canids: Foxes, Wolves, Jackals and Dogs (pp. 117–123). Gland, Switzerland and Cambridge, UK: Hofgaard, A. & Harper, K. (2011). Hofgaard, A. & Harper, K. (2011). Hofgaard, A. & Harper, K. (2011). Hofgaard, A. & Harper, K. (2011). Hofgaard, A. & Harper, K. (2011)./SSC Canid Specialist Group.
- Hund, A. (2014). Antarctica & The Arctic Circle. Santa Barbara: Abc-Clio, Llc All.
- Rausch, R (1953). "On the status of some arctic mammals". Arctic. 6 (2): 91–148. doi:10.14430/arctic3870.
