= Northern Canada =

Coordinates: 65°49′12″N 107°04′48″W

Northern Canada Nord canadien (French)
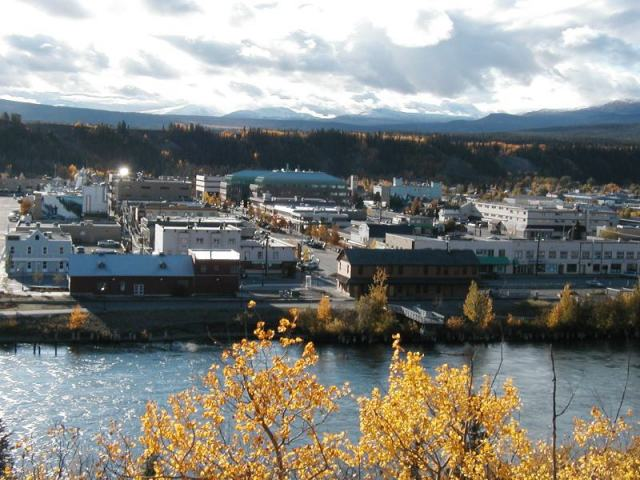
- Downtown Whitehorse, Yukon (the territories' largest city) seen from the east side of the Yukon River

- Northern Canada, defined politically to comprise (from west to east) Yukon, Northwest Territories and Nunavut.
- Country: Canada
- Territories: Northwest Territories; Nunavut; Yukon
- Largest city: Whitehorse

Area
  - Total: 3,535,263 km^{2} (1,364,973 sq mi)

Population (2021)
  - Total: 118,160
  - Density: 0.033423/km^{2} (0.086566/sq mi)

Northern Canada (French: le Nord du Canada), colloquially the North or the Territories, is the vast northernmost region of Canada, variously defined by geography and politics. Politically, the term refers to the three territories of Canada: Yukon, Northwest Territories and Nunavut. This area covers about 48 per cent of Canada's total land area, but has less than 0.5 per cent of Canada's population.

The terms "northern Canada" or "the North" may be used in contrast with the far north, which may refer to the Canadian Arctic, the portion of Canada that lies north of the Arctic Circle, east of Alaska and west of Greenland. That said, in many other uses the two areas are treated as a single unit. Lastly, northern areas of Canadian provinces have been called the "Provincial North".

== Capitals ==
The three territorial capitals are each the only cities and largest municipalities within their respective territories. From west to east, these are:

- Yukon - Whitehorse
- Northwest Territories - Yellowknife
- Nunavut - Iqaluit

== Definitions ==
Climate	Political	Habitat	Northern development
Parts of Northern Canada within the red line are considered to be a part of the Arctic Region according to the average temperature of their warmest month.	Political definition of Northern Canada – the territories of Canada generally north of the 60th parallel.	Barren Grounds and tundra are shown in light blue, and the taiga and boreal forest in dark blue.	The three territories and northern portions of seven provinces are defined as northern Canada for northern development purposes by the Conference Board of Canada's Centre for the North, the Northern Development Ministers Forum, and Statistics Canada.

=== Subdivisions ===
As a social rather than political region, the Canadian North is often subdivided into two distinct regions based on climate, the near north and the far north. The different climates of these two regions result in vastly different vegetation, and therefore very different economies, settlement patterns and histories.

==== Near north ====
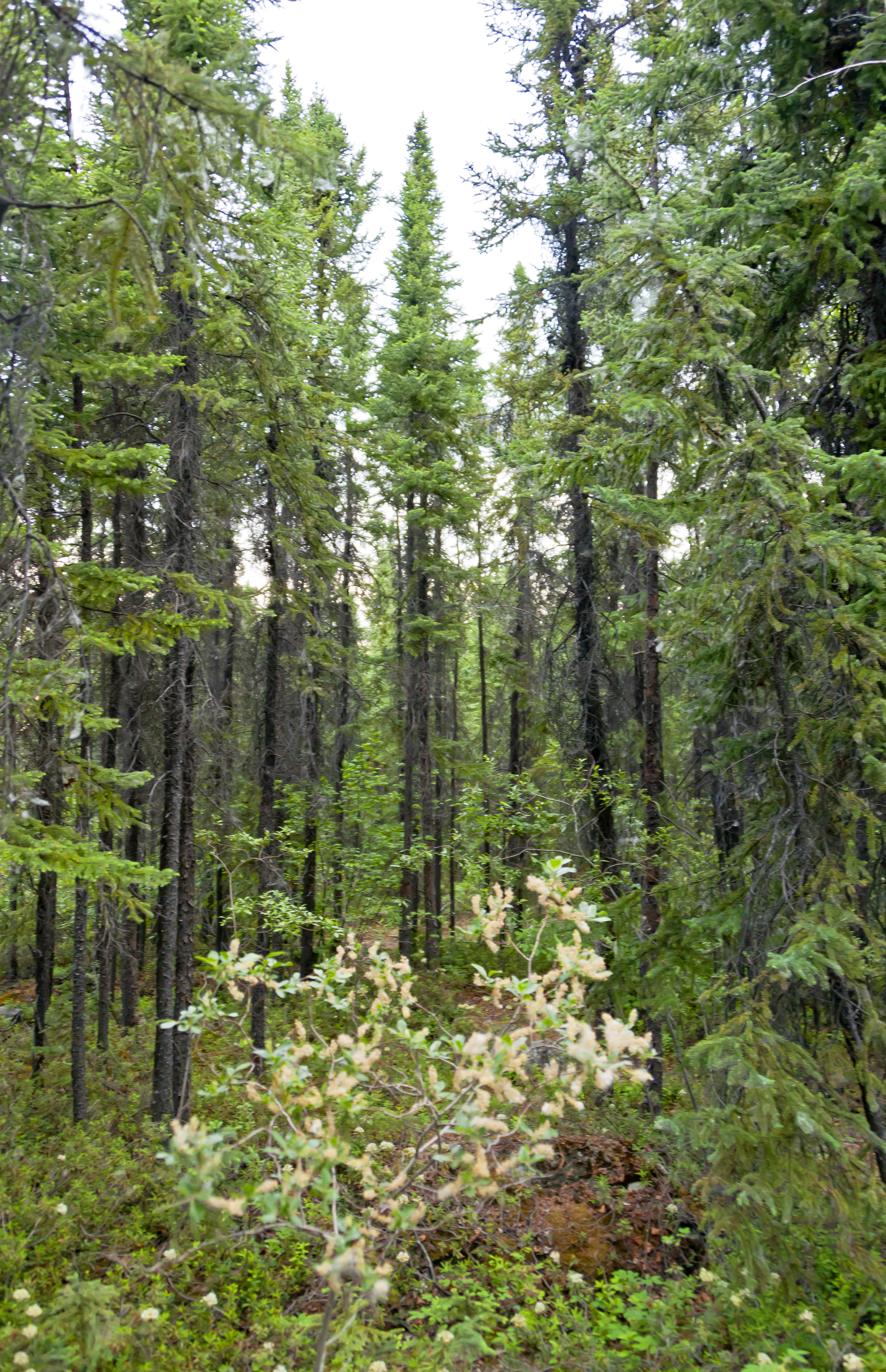
Outside Yellowknife, Northwest Territories

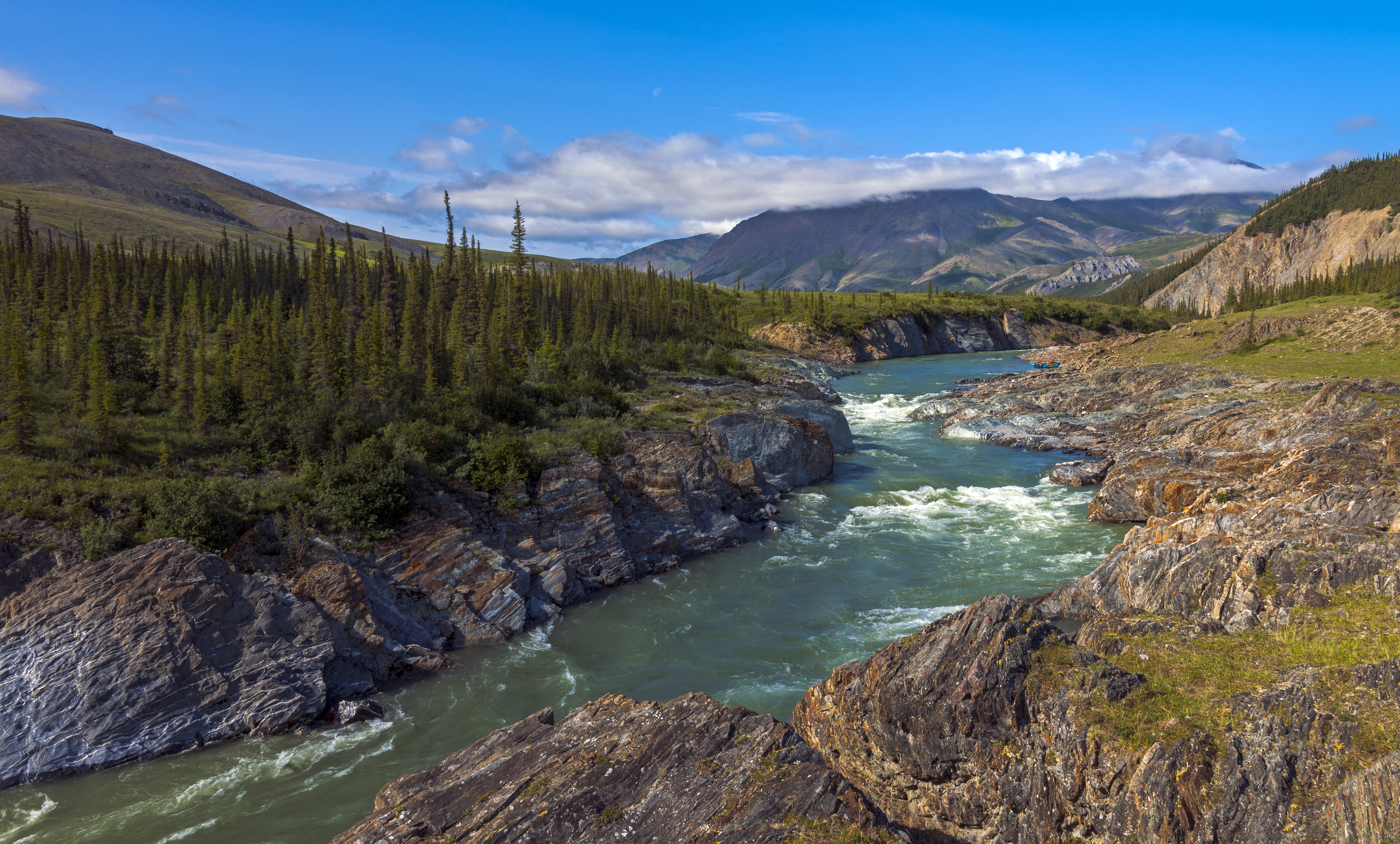
Sheep Slot Rapids on the Firth River in Yukon's Ivvavik National Park

The "near north" or sub-Arctic is mostly synonymous with the Canadian boreal forest, a large area of evergreen-dominated forests with a subarctic climate. This area has traditionally been home to the Indigenous peoples of the Subarctic, that is the First Nations, who were hunters of moose, freshwater fishers and trappers. This region was heavily involved in the North American fur trade during its peak importance, and is home to many Métis people who originated in that trade. The area was mostly part of Rupert's Land under the nominal control of the Hudson's Bay Company (HBC) from 1670 to 1869, who regarded Rupert's Land as their proprietary colony.

In 1670, King Charles II of England in his grant creating the proprietary colony Rupert's Land defined its frontiers as all the lands adjudging Hudson Strait, Hudson Bay or rivers flowing into Hudson Bay, in theory giving control of much of what is now Canada to the HBC. Under the royal charter of 2 May 1670, the HBC received the theoretical control of 1.5 million square miles (3.9 million square kilometres) making up 40% of what is now Canada. Despite its claim that Rupert's Land was a proprietary colony, the HBC controlled only the areas around its forts (trading posts) on the shores of James Bay and Hudson Bay, and never sought to impose political control on the First Nations peoples, whose co-operation was needed for the fur trade. For its first century, the HBC never ventured inland, being content to have the First Nations peoples come to its forts to trade fur for European goods. The HBC started to move inland only in the late 18th century to assert its claim to Rupert's Land in response to rival fur traders coming out of Montreal who were hurting profits by going directly to the First Nations.

The HBC's claim to Rupert's Land, which, as the company was the de facto administrator, included the North-Western Territory, was purchased by the Canadian government in 1869. After buying Rupert's Land, Canada renamed the area it had purchased the Northwest Territories. Shortly thereafter the government made a series of treaties with the local First Nations regarding land title. This opened the region to non-Native settlement, as well as to forestry, mining, and oil and gas drilling. In 1896, gold was discovered in the Yukon, leading to the Klondike Gold Rush in 1896-1899, and the first substantial white settlements were made in the near north. To deal with the increased settlement in the Klondike, the Yukon Territory was created in 1898.

Today several million people live in the near north, around 15% of the Canadian total. Large parts of the near north are not part of Canada's territories, but rather are the northern parts of the provinces of Quebec, Ontario, Manitoba, Saskatchewan, and Alberta, meaning they have very different political histories as minority regions within larger units. In the late 19th and early 20th centuries, Canada reduced the size of the Northwest Territory by carving new provinces out of it such as Alberta, Saskatchewan, and Manitoba, together with the new territory of the Yukon, while transferring other parts of the Northwest Territory to Ontario and Quebec.

==== Far north ====
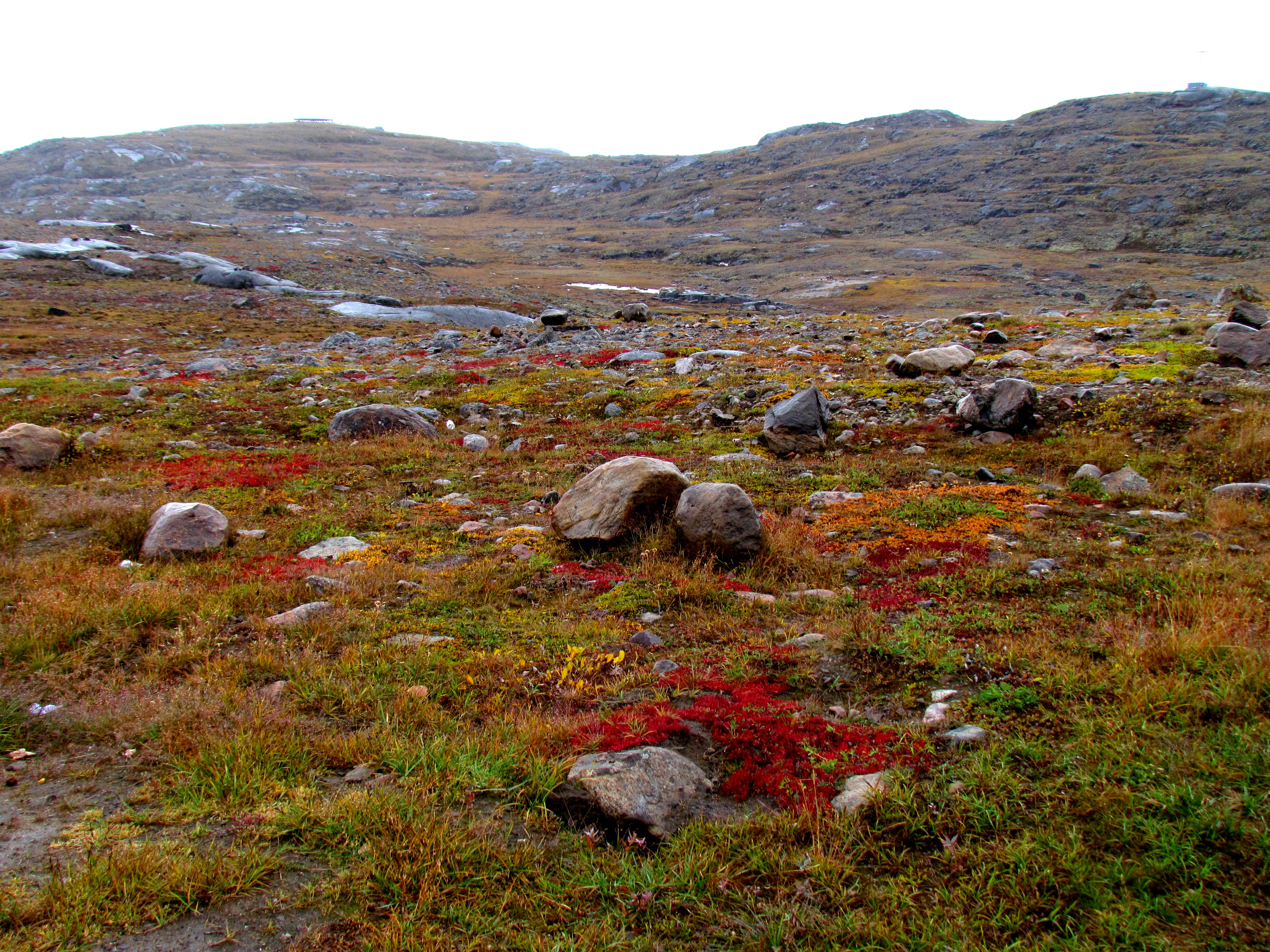
A typical tundra landscape in Nunavut.

The "far north" is synonymous with the areas north of the tree line: the Barren Grounds and tundra. This area is home to the various sub-groups of the Inuit, a people unrelated to other Indigenous peoples in Canada. These are people who have traditionally relied mostly on hunting marine mammals and caribou, mainly barren-ground caribou, as well as fish and migratory birds. The Inuit lived in groups that pursued a hunter-gatherer lifestyle, with a basic governmental system in which power was exercised by the local headman, a person acknowledged to be the best hunter, and the angakkuq, sometimes called shamans. This area was somewhat involved in the fur trade, but was more influenced by the whaling industry. Britain maintained a claim to the far north as part of the British Arctic Territories, and in 1880 transferred its claim to Canada, who incorporated the far north into the Northwest Territories.

The Inuit were not aware of the existence of the British Arctic territory claim nor were they aware for some time afterwards that under international law their territories had just been included in Canada. It was not until 1920, when detachments of the Royal Canadian Mounted Police (RCMP) started being sent into the far north to enforce Canadian law, that Canadian sovereignty over the region became effective. This area was not part of the early 20th century treaty process, and aboriginal title to the land has been acknowledged by the Canadian government with the creation of autonomous territories instead of the Indian reserves of further south.

In 1982 a referendum was held to decide on splitting the Northwest Territories. This was followed by the 1992 Nunavut creation referendum, with the majority of the people in the far north voting to leave the Northwest Territories, leading to creation of the new territory of Nunavut in 1999. Very few non-Indigenous people have settled in these areas, and the residents of the far north represent less than 1% of Canada's total population.

The far north is also often broken into western and eastern parts and sometimes a central part. The eastern Arctic includes the self-governing territory of Nunavut (much of which is in the true Arctic, being north of the Arctic Circle), sometimes excluding Cambridge Bay and Kugluktuk; Nunavik, an autonomous part of the province of Quebec; Nunatsiavut, an autonomous part of the province of Newfoundland and Labrador; and perhaps a few parts of the Hudson Bay coast of Ontario and Manitoba. The western Arctic is the northernmost portion of the Northwest Territories (roughly Inuvik Region) and a small part of Yukon, together called the Inuvialuit Settlement Region, and sometimes includes Cambridge Bay and Kugluktuk. The central Arctic covers the pre-division Kitikmeot Region, Northwest Territories.

Flag	Arms	Territory	Capital	Area	Population (2021)	Population density
Northwest Territories		Northwest Territories	Yellowknife	1,346,106 km^{2} (519,734 sq mi)	41,070	0.031/km^{2} (0.080/sq mi)
Yukon		Yukon	Whitehorse	482,443 km^{2} (186,272 sq mi)	40,232	0.083/km^{2} (0.21/sq mi)
Nunavut		Nunavut	Iqaluit	2,038,722 km^{2} (787,155 sq mi)	36,858	0.018/km^{2} (0.047/sq mi)

=== Territoriality ===
Since 1925, Canada has claimed the portion of the Arctic between 60°W and 141°W longitude, extending all the way north to the North Pole: All islands in the Arctic Archipelago and Herschel, off the Yukon coast, form part of the region and are Canadian territory, and the territorial waters claimed by Canada surround these islands. Views of territorial claims in this region are complicated by disagreements on legal principles. Canada and the Soviet Union/Russia have long claimed that their territory extends according to the sector principle to the North Pole. The United States does not accept the sector principle and does not make a sector claim based on its Alaskan Arctic coast. Claims that undersea geographic features are extensions of a country's continental shelf are also used to support claims; for example the Denmark/Greenland claim on territory to the North Pole, some of which is disputed by Canada.

Foreign ships, both civilian and military, are allowed the right of innocent passage through the territorial waters of a littoral state subject to conditions in the United Nations Convention on the Law of the Sea. The right of innocent passage is not allowed, however, in internal waters, which are enclosed bodies of water or waters landward of a chain of islands. Disagreements about the sector principle or extension of territory to the North Pole and about the definition of internal waters in the Arctic lie behind differences in territorial claims in the Arctic. This claim is recognized by most countries with some exceptions, including the United States; Denmark, Russia, and Norway have made claims similar to those of Canada in the Arctic and are opposed by the European Union and the United States. This is especially important with the Northwest Passage, which Canada asserts control of as part of Canadian Internal Waters because it is within 20 km (12 mi) of Canadian islands; however, the United States claims that it is in international waters. As of 2023, ice and freezing temperatures have always made this a minor issue, but climate change may make the passage more accessible to shipping. Furthermore, the thawing of the polar ice cap increases the mutual proximity of Canada and Russia as a result of the historically unusable Arctic Ocean becoming increasingly navigable.

== Demographics ==
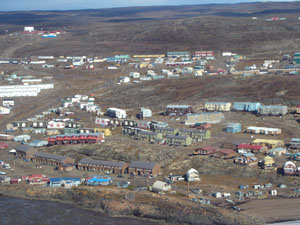
Iqaluit is the capital, the only city and largest population centre in Nunavut

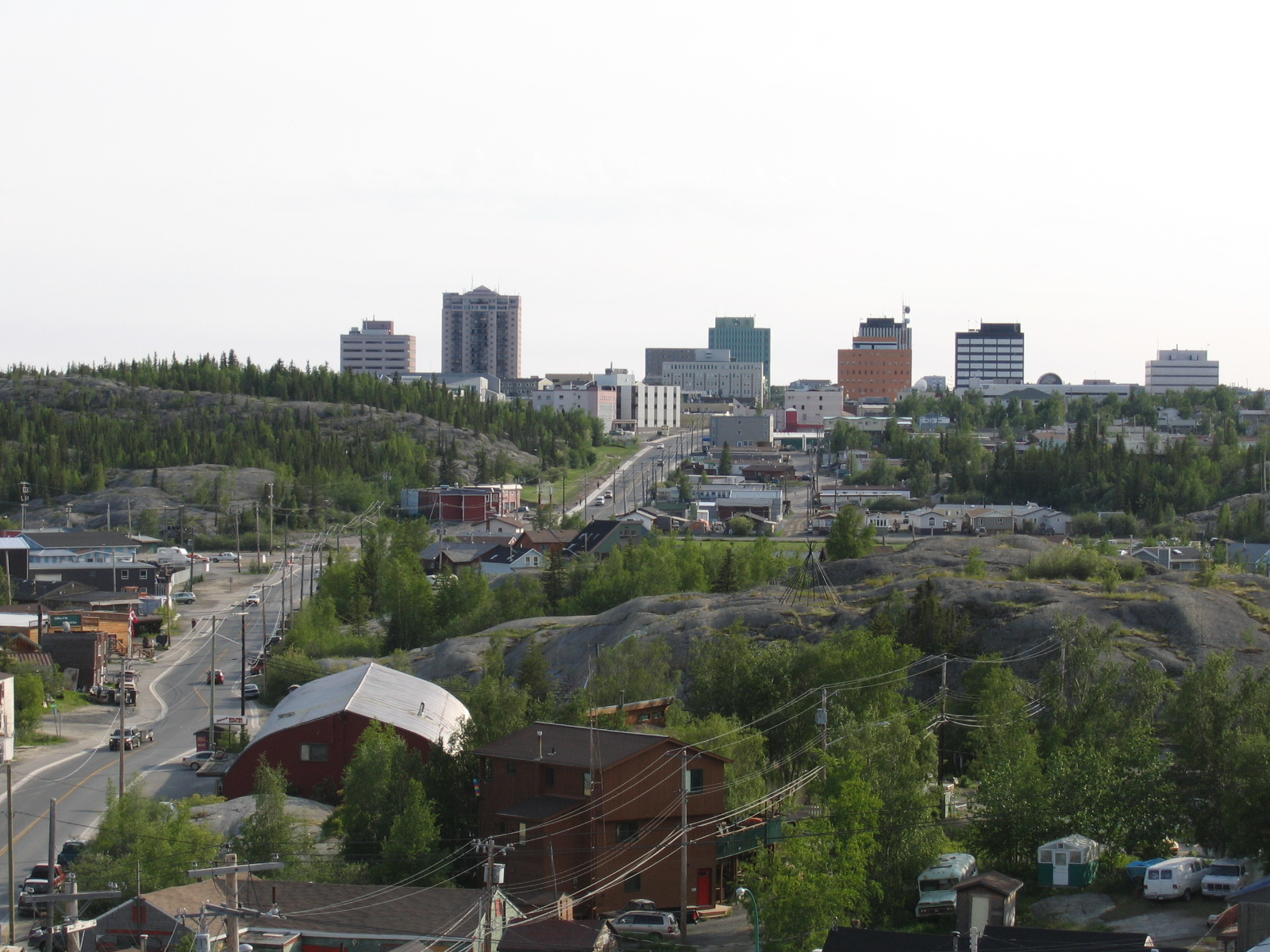
Skyline of Yellowknife, Northwest Territories

Using the political definition of the three northern territories, the north, with an area of 3,921,739 km^{2} (1,514,192 sq mi), makes up 39.3% of Canada.

Although vast, the entire region is very sparsely populated. As of 2021, only about 118,160 people lived there, compared with 36,991,981 in the rest of Canada.

The population density for Northern Canada is 0.03/km^{2} (0.078/sq mi) (0.08/km^{2} (0.21/sq mi) for Yukon, 0.03/km^{2} (0.078/sq mi) for the NWT and 0.02/km^{2} (0.052/sq mi) for Nunavut), compared with 4.2/km^{2} (11/sq mi) for Canada.

The region is heavily endowed with natural resources, but in most cases they are very expensive to extract and situated in fragile environmental areas. Though GDP per person is higher than elsewhere in Canada, the region remains relatively poor, mostly because of the extremely high cost of most consumer goods, and the region is heavily subsidised by the government of Canada.

As of 2016, 53.3% of the population of the three territories (23.3% in Yukon, 50.7% in the NWT and 85.9% in Nunavut) is Indigenous, Inuit, First Nations or Métis. The Inuit are the largest group of Indigenous peoples in Northern Canada, and 53.0% of all Canada's Inuit live in Northern Canada, with Nunavut accounting for 46.4%. The region also contains several groups of First Nations, who are mainly Dene, with the Chipewyan making up the largest sub-group. The three territories each have a greater proportion of Aboriginal inhabitants than any of Canada's provinces. There are also many more recent immigrants from around the world; of the territories, Yukon has the largest percentage of non-Aboriginal inhabitants, while Nunavut the smallest.

As of 2021, the largest settlement in Northern Canada is Whitehorse, the capital of Yukon, with 28,201 inhabitants. Second is Yellowknife, the capital of the Northwest Territories, which contains 20,340 inhabitants. Third is Iqaluit, the capital of Nunavut, with 7,429.

Largest cities or towns in Northern Canada Statistics Canada 2021
Rank		Territory	Pop.	Rank		Territory	Pop.
1	Whitehorse	Yukon	28,201	11	Cambridge Bay	Nunavut	1,760
2	Yellowknife	Northwest Territories	20,340	12	Behchokǫ̀	Northwest Territories	1,746
3	Iqaluit	Nunavut	7,429	13	Dawson City	Yukon	1,577
4	Hay River	Northwest Territories	3,169	14	Pond Inlet	Nunavut	1,555
5	Inuvik	Northwest Territories	3,137	15	Pangnirtung	Nunavut	1,504
6	Rankin Inlet	Nunavut	2,975	16	Kinngait	Nunavut	1,396
7	Arviat	Nunavut	2,864	17	Kugluktuk	Nunavut	1,382
8	Fort Smith	Northwest Territories	2,248	18	Gjoa Haven	Nunavut	1,349
9	Baker Lake	Nunavut	2,061	19	Naujaat	Nunavut	1,225
10	Igloolik	Nunavut	2,049	20	Clyde River	Nunavut	1,181

=== Recent ===
Although it has not been on the same scale, some towns and cities have experienced population increases not seen for several decades before. Yellowknife has become the centre of diamond production for Canada (which has become one of the top three countries for diamonds).

In the 2006 Canadian Census, the three territories posted a combined population of over 100,000 for the first time in Canadian history.

== Topography (geography) ==
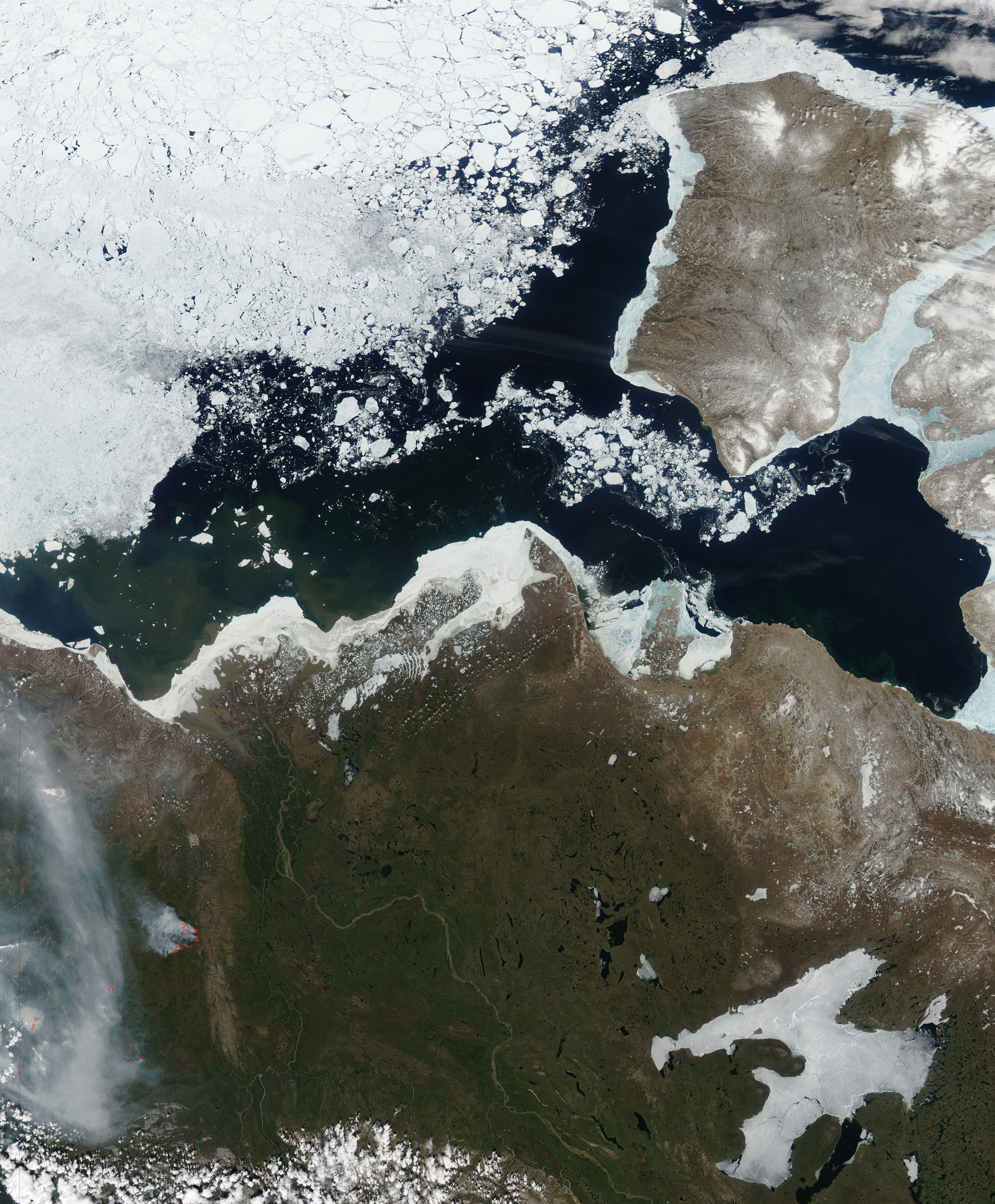
The western Canadian Arctic in early June 2010.

While the largest part of the Arctic is composed of permanent ice and the Canadian Arctic tundra north of the tree line, it encompasses geological regions of varying types: The Innuitian Mountains, associated with the Arctic Cordillera mountain system, are geologically distinct from the Arctic Region (which consists largely of lowlands). The Arctic and Hudson Bay Lowlands comprise a substantial part of the geographic region often considered part of the Canadian Shield (in contrast to the sole geological area). The ground in the Arctic is mostly composed of permafrost, making construction difficult and often hazardous, and agriculture virtually impossible.

The Arctic watershed (or drainage basin) drains northern parts of Manitoba, Alberta and British Columbia, most of the Northwest Territories and Nunavut, and parts of Yukon into the Arctic Ocean, including the Beaufort Sea and Baffin Bay. With the exception of the Mackenzie River, Canada's longest river, this watershed has been little used for hydroelectricity. The Peace and Athabasca rivers, along with Great Bear and Great Slave Lake (respectively the largest and second largest lakes wholly enclosed within Canada), are significant elements of the Arctic watershed. Each of these elements eventually merges with the Mackenzie so that it thereby drains the vast majority of the Arctic watershed.

=== Climate ===
==== Overview ====
Under the Köppen climate classification, much of mainland Northern Canada has a subarctic climate, with a tundra climate in most of the Arctic Archipelago and on the northern coasts, and an ice cap climate in some parts of the Arctic Cordillera. For more than half of the year, much of Northern Canada is snow- and ice-covered, with some limited moderation by the relatively warmer waters in coastal areas, with temperatures generally remaining below the freezing mark from October to May. During the coldest three months, mean monthly temperatures range from −29 °C (−20 °F) in the southern sections to −34 °C (−30 °F) in the northern sections, although temperatures can go down to −48 to −51 °C (−55 to −60 °F). Owing to the dry cold air prevalent throughout most of the region, snowfall is often light. During the short summers, much of Northern Canada is snow free, except for the Arctic Cordillera, which remains covered with snow and ice throughout the year. In the summer months, temperatures average below 7 °C (45 °F) but may occasionally exceed 18 °C (65 °F). Most of the rainfall accumulated occurs in the summer months, ranging from 25 to 51 mm (1 to 2 in) in the northernmost islands to 180 mm (7 in) at the southern end of Baffin Island.

Northern Canada's coastline has faced significant changes due to climate change. The annual precipitation as well as the ratio of snow to rain have increased since 1950. Sea ice has decreased in the region, leading to higher summer surface air temperatures. In the Canadian Arctic Archipelago sea ice cover decreased by 2.9% per decade from 1968 to 2008, while in Hudson Bay this decreased by 11.3% per decade. Storms in the Arctic have increased and become more intense.

== Politics ==
=== Federal politics ===
The northern territories are represented in the Parliament of Canada by 3 Members of Parliament (MPs) in the House of Commons (1 from each territory) and 3 senators (1 from each territory). Currently, all 3 of the northern MPs in the Commons are Liberals after Nunavut MP Lori Idlout crossed the floor to the Liberal Party.

2025 Federal Election Results for Northern Canada
Party name		YT	NT	NU	Total
Liberal	Seats:	1	1	–	2
Liberal	Vote:	53.0	53.8	36.4	–
Conservative	Seats:	–	–	–	0
Conservative	Vote:	38.5	33.2	26.1	–
New Democratic Party	Seats:	–	–	1	1
New Democratic Party	Vote:	6.4	12.0	37.4	–
Green	Seats:	–	–	–	0
Green	Vote:	2.1	1.0	–	–
Total seats		1	1	1	3

2025 Federal Election Seat Results for Northern Canada
2	1
Liberal	New Democratic

2021 Federal Election Seat Results for Northern Canada
2	1
Liberal	New Democratic

2019 Federal Election Seat Results for Northern Canada
2	1
Liberal	New Democratic

2015 Federal Election Seat Results for Northern Canada
3
Liberal

2011 Federal Election Seat Results for Northern Canada
2	1
Conservative	New Democratic

2008 Federal Election Seat Results for Northern Canada
1	1	1
Conservative	Liberal	New Democratic

2006 Federal Election Seat Results for Northern Canada
2	1
Liberal	New Democratic

2004 Federal Election Seat Results for Northern Canada
3
Liberal

2000 Federal Election Seat Results for Northern Canada
3
Liberal

1997 Federal Election Seat Results for Northern Canada
2	1
Liberal	New Democratic

1993 Federal Election Seat Results for Northern Canada
2	1
Liberal	New Democratic

1988 Federal Election Seat Results for Northern Canada
2	1
Liberal	New Democratic

1984 Federal Election Seat Results for Northern Canada
3
Progressive Conservative

1980 Federal Election Seat Results for Northern Canada
2	1
Progressive Conservative	New Democratic

== See also ==
- Arctic policy of Canada
- Geography of Canada
- Northern Alberta
- Northern Manitoba
- Northern Ontario
- Northern Quebec
- Northern United States
- Northern Saskatchewan
- North American Arctic
- Operation Hurricane (Canada)
