= Mount Whisler =

Mountain in Nunavut, Canada

- Location within Nunavut

Highest point
- Elevation: 2,500 m (8,200 ft)
- Prominence: 450 m (1,480 ft)
- Parent peak: Barbeau Peak (2616m)
- Coordinates: 82°01′N 74°32′W

Geography
- Location: Nunavut, Canada
- Parent range: British Empire Range
- Topo map: NTS 340E2 Mount Whisler

Climbing
- First ascent: 1961
- Easiest route: basic snow climb

Mount Whisler is a mountain of the British Empire Range on Canada's Ellesmere Island. It is the second highest peak of the British Empire Range, of Ellesmere Island, and of the Arctic Cordillera. It is located about 12 km (7.5 mi) northeast of Barbeau Peak (2,616 m (8,583 ft)), the highest peak in the Cordillera. The Henrietta Nesmith Glacier completely surrounds Mount Whisler.

The United States Army Signal Corps first mapped Mount Whisler in 1882 during their Lady Franklin Bay Expedition. It was named for Private William Whisler, a member of the party.
