= Highpointer Peak =

Mountain in Nunavut, Canada

Highest point
- Elevation: 1,585 m (5,200 ft)
- Coordinates: 81°40′N 076°50′W

Geography
- Location: Nunavut, Canada
- Parent range: British Empire Range
- Topo map: NTS 340D11 Fiala Glacier

Highpointer Peak is a peak of the British Empire Range on Ellesmere Island. Highpointer is located about 22 km (14 mi) west of Barbeau Peak (2,616 m (8,583 ft)), the highest peak of the range.
