= United States Range =

Mountain range in Nunavut, Canada

- Map of Northern Ellesmere Island and far Northern Greenland

Highest point
- Peak: Mount Eugene
- Elevation: 1,880 m (6,170 ft)
- Coordinates: 82°25′N 66°47′W

Geography
- Location within Nunavut
- Country: Canada
- Territory: Nunavut
- Range coordinates: 82°25′N 68°0′W
- Parent range: Innuitian Mountains
- Borders on: British Empire Range
- Topo map: NTS 120F6 Barrier Glacier

Geology
- Orogeny: Innuitian
- Rock age: Mesozoic

The United States Range is one of the northernmost mountain ranges of the Arctic Cordillera and in the world, surpassed only by the Challenger Mountains to the northwest. The range is located in the northeastern region of Ellesmere Island in Nunavut, Canada, and is part of the Innuitian Mountains. The highest mountain in the range is Mount Eugene with an elevation of 1,880 metres (6,170 ft). The British Empire Range is immediately to the west of the United States Range.

The range was named in 1861 by American explorer Isaac Israel Hayes after his ship.

== See also ==
- List of mountain ranges
