= Arrowhead Mountain (Nunavut) =

Mountain in Nunavut, Canada

- Location within Nunavut

Highest point
- Elevation: 1,860 m (6,100 ft)
- Prominence: 476 m (1,562 ft)
- Coordinates: 82°13′13″N 72°13′51″W

Geography
- Location: Nunavut, Canada
- Parent range: British Empire Range
- Topo map: NTS 340E1 (untitled)

Arrowhead Mountain is a mountain located on Ellesmere Island, Nunavut, Canada and is located east northeast of Mount Oxford. The mountain was named due to the four ridges that rise to a peak.
