= Arctic Coastal Plain =

Arctic Coastal Plain may refer to:

- A zone of the physiographic region of Arctic Lands, northern Canada
- Arctic coastal tundra, an ecoregion of the far north of North America
