= Gordon Noel Humphreys =

British explorer (1883–1966)

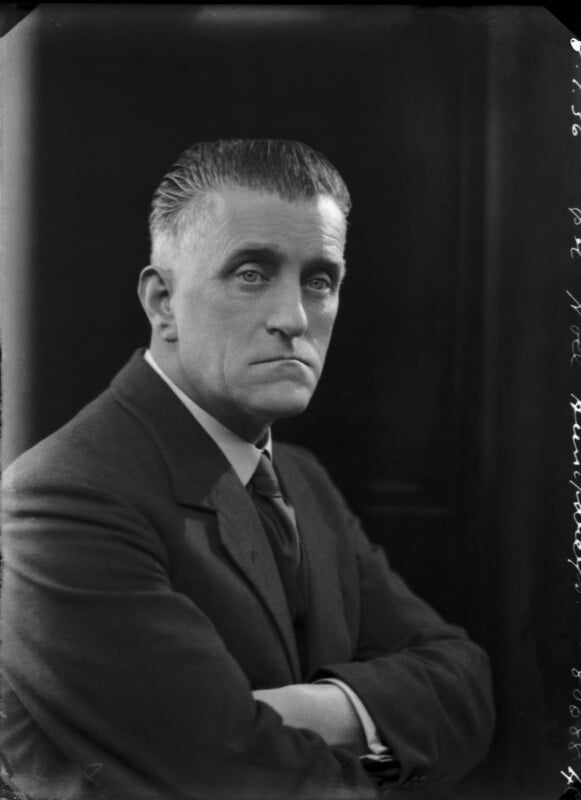
Humphreys in 1936

Gordon Noel Humphreys (1883–1966) was a British born surveyor, pilot, botanist, explorer and doctor. Originally trained as a surveyor, Humphreys worked in both Mexico and Uganda. During World War I he served as a pilot with the Royal Flying Corps, was shot down and spent his internment training himself in botany.

== Early life and education ==
Humphreys was a graduate of University of Cambridge.

== Oxford University Ellesmere Land Expedition ==
After the war it was his survey work and exploration of the Ruwenzori Range in Uganda that brought him to the attention of Edward Shackleton. Humphreys was chosen as the leader and head surveyor of the "Oxford University Ellesmere Land Expedition" (OUELE) by Shackleton, who was the organiser of the expedition. Consisting of Shackleton, photographer and biologist A. W. Moore (sometimes listed as Morris), H. W. Stallworthy of the Royal Canadian Mounted Police, geologist Robert Bentham and ornithologist David Haig-Thomas, along with their Greenland Inuit guides, Inutuk and Nukapinguaq, they set up camp at Etah, Greenland, in 1934.

From the camp Inutuk, Nukapinguaq, Stallworthy and Moore proceeded to Lake Hazen on Ellesmere Island, Canada, where they set up camp. From there Moore and Nukapinguaq continued up the Gilman Glacier and then made the first known ascent of Mount Oxford. Naming the mountain after the University of Oxford, Moore estimated the height to be 9,000 ft (2,743 m), it rises to about 7,250 ft (2,210 m).

From the summit they could see a mountain range that the "great imperialist" (as Humphreys was called by Shackleton in 1937) named the British Empire Range. Again Moore was to overestimate the height of the range at 10,000 ft (3,048 m), in fact the highest point, Barbeau Peak, is 8,583 ft (2,616 m).

By the end of May 1935 the group had returned to Etah and to England in late September the same year.

== Mount Everest ==
In 1936 Humphreys was a member of the 6th British Expedition to attempt to climb Mount Everest. The expedition, led by Hugh Ruttledge, reached a height of 23,000 ft (7,010 m) on the North Col. However, due to bad weather they could not go any higher. Included in the party were Eric Shipton and Tenzing Norgay.

== Retirement ==
Humphreys retired to Devon and died there in 1966.

== External links & references ==
- Expedition members listing Morris instead of Moore
- Expedition members listing Moore rather than Morris
- Extract from "Oxford University Ellesmere Land Expedition: Discussion"
- Gordon Noel Humphreys short biography
- 6th British Everest Expedition
- Geographical Names of the Ellesmere Island National Park Reserve and Vicinity by Geoffrey Hattersley-Smith (1998) ISBN 0-919034-96-9
