= British Empire Range =

Mountain range in Nunavut, Canada

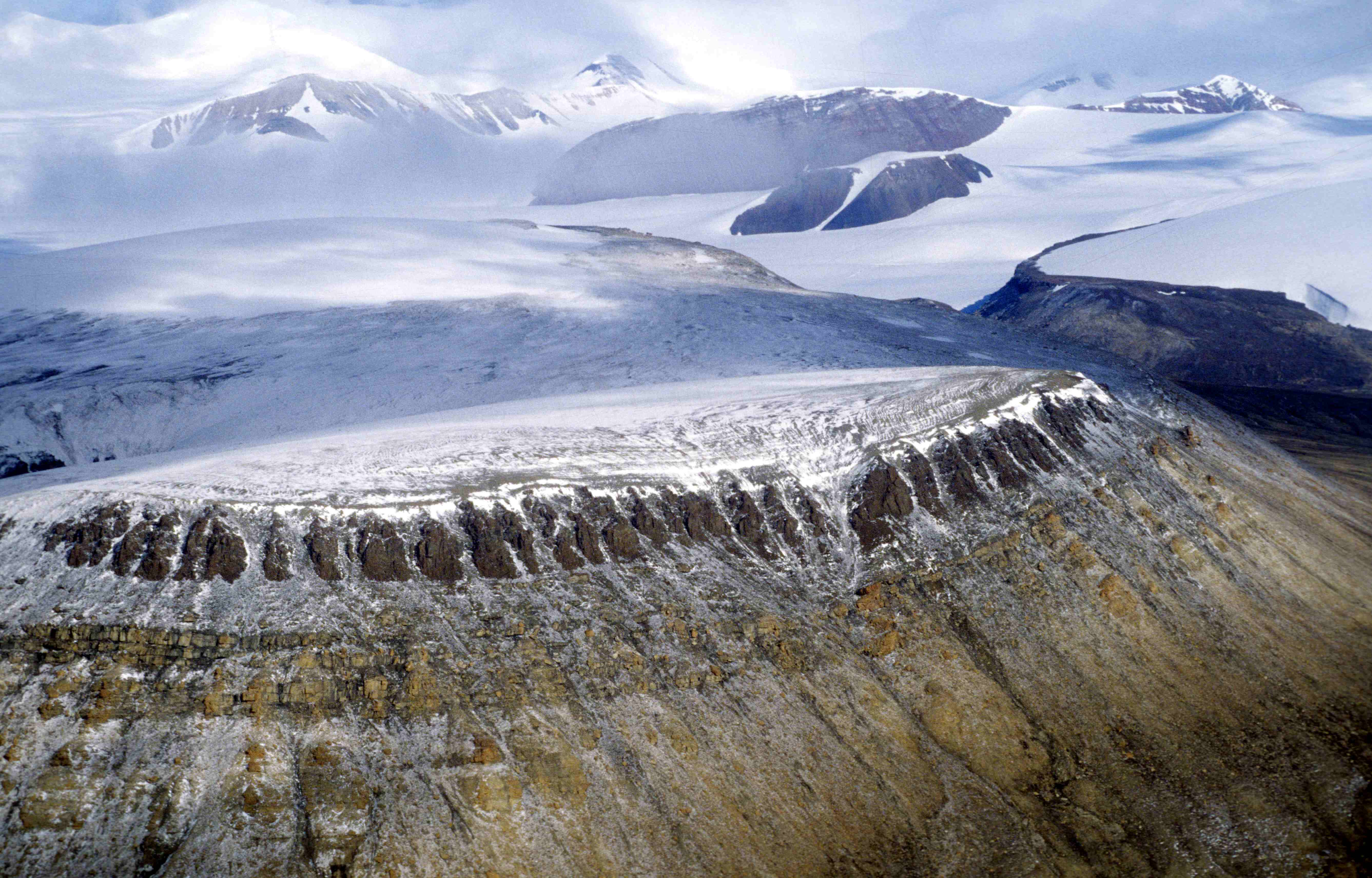
- British Empire Range, to the north of Tanquary Fiord

Highest point
- Peak: Barbeau Peak
- Elevation: 2,616 m (8,583 ft)
- Coordinates: 81°54′30″N 75°01′30″W

Geography
- Location within Nunavut
- Country: Canada
- Territory: Nunavut
- Range coordinates: 82°21′N 77°30′W

The British Empire Range is a mountain range on Ellesmere Island in Nunavut, Canada. The range is one of the most northern ranges in the world and the Arctic Cordillera, surpassed only by the Challenger Mountains which lies immediately to the northwest and the United States Range slightly further east. The highest mountain in the range is Barbeau Peak.

The range was named by Gordon Noel Humphreys during the Oxford University Ellesmere Land Expedition. Edward Shackleton, also a member of the party, claimed, in 1937, that Humphreys had done so because he was "a great imperialist".

Peaks of the range include:

Peak	metres	feet
Barbeau Peak	2,616	8,583
Mount Whisler	2,500	8,202
Mount Oxford	2,210	7,250
Arrowhead Mountain	1,860	6,102
Highpointer Peak	1,585	5,200
