= Commonwealth Mountain =

Mountain in Nunavut, Canada

- Location within Nunavut

Highest point
- Elevation: 2,225 m (7,300 ft)
- Listing: Mountains of Canada
- Coordinates: 82°24′N 76°45′W

Geography
- Location: Ellesmere Island, Nunavut, Canada
- Protected area: Quttinirpaaq National Park
- Parent range: Challenger Mountains
- Topo map: NTS 340E6 Commonwealth Mountain

Commonwealth Mountain is a mountain on Ellesmere Island, Nunavut, Canada. It lies in western Quttinirpaaq National Park, which is the most northerly extent of Canada, and is the second most northerly park on Earth after Northeast Greenland National Park.

With a height of 2,225 m (7,300 ft), it is highest point of the Challenger Mountains which in turn form part of the Arctic Cordillera mountain range.
