= Innuitian Region =

Physiographic division in northern Canada

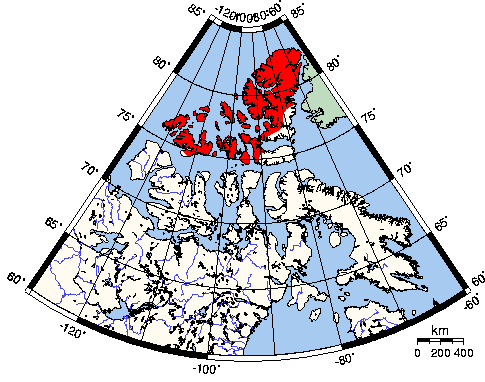
Map of the Canadian Arctic Lands showing the Innuitian Region

The Innuitian Region is a physiographic division of Canada's far north. It is one of three physiographic divisions of the Arctic Lands physiographic region, along with the Arctic Coastal Plain, and the Arctic Lowlands.The Queen Elizabeth Islands comprise most of the region, which is also considered to be part of the Arctic Archipelago.

== Physiographic regions and divisions ==
Each physiographic region, subregion and division has its own subregions and divisions—distinguished by topography and geology.

The Innuitian Region has three major mountain ranges—the Grantland, the Princess Margaret Range, and the Victoria and Albert Mountains. Between the mountains are vast plateaus, uplands and lowlands. These mountain ranges are part of the Innuitian Mountains which in turn form part of the Arctic Cordillera mountain system. On central Axel Heiberg Island and northwestern Ellesmere Island, the mountains are nearly buried by ice sheets through which the peaks project as a row of nunataks. Between these three large mountainous zones lies the Eureka Upland. To the south are the Perry Plateau and the Sverdrup Lowlands, a region of low relief, rolling, and scarped lowland. About one third of the Ellesmere and Axel Heiberg Islands are covered with ice.
