= Mount Eugene =

Mountain in Nunavut, Canada

Highest point
- Elevation: 1,880 m (6,170 ft) (Note: The CGNDB map shows the mountain within the 1880 metre contour line.)
- Prominence: 1,417 m (4,649 ft)
- Listing: Mountains of Canada
- Coordinates: 82°25′N 66°47′W

Geography
- Country: Canada
- Territory: Nunavut
- Parent range: United States Range
- Topo map: NTS 120F7 Mount Eugene

Climbing
- Easiest route: basic snow climb

Mount Eugene is the highest mountain of the United States Range on Ellesmere Island. Originally named "Mount Arthur Eugene" in 1883 by the United States Army Signal Service during their Lady Franklin Bay expedition.
