= Innuitian Mountains =

Mountain range in Nunavut and the Northwest Territories, Canada

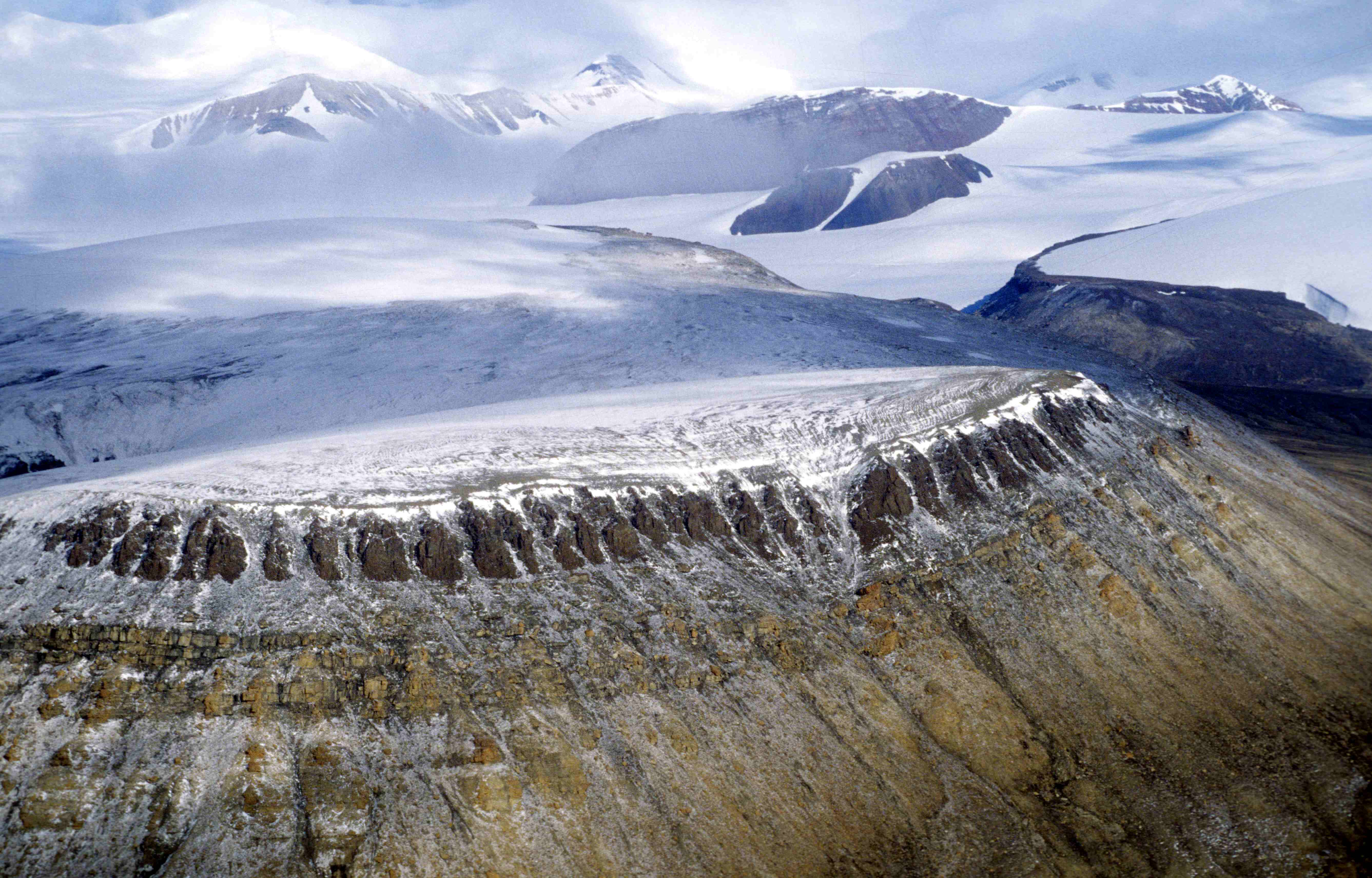
- British Empire Range, in the north of Tanquary Fiord

Highest point
- Peak: Barbeau Peak
- Elevation: 2,616 m (8,583 ft)
- Coordinates: 81°54′30″N 75°01′30″W

Geography
- Location within Canada
- Country: Canada
- Provinces: Nunavut and Northwest Territories
- Parent range: Arctic Cordillera

Geology
- Orogeny: Innuitian
- Rock age: Mesozoic
- Rock types: Igneous, Metamorphic and Sedimentary

The Innuitian Mountains are a mountain range in Nunavut and the Northwest Territories, Canada. They are part of the Arctic Cordillera and are largely unexplored, due to the hostile climate. They are named after the northern indigenous people, the Inuit. In some locations the Innuitian Mountains measure over 2,500 m (8,202 ft) in height, and 1,290 km (802 mi) in length. The highest point is Barbeau Peak on Ellesmere Island at 2,616 m (8,583 ft). There are no trees and minimal wildlife in the Innuitian Mountains due to the harsh cold climate as well as being located north of the Arctic tree line. This region is mostly barren with vast areas of permafrost. There are metallic mineral resources including iron and zinc and fossil fuel resources such as coal.

The Innuitian Mountains consist of numerous smaller mountain ranges. Some of these are the British Empire Range, the Princess Margaret Range and the United States Range, which is the world's second most northerly mountain range after the Challenger Mountains.

The Innuitian Mountains were first seen by European explorers in 1882 by the explorer Adolphus Greely from Lake Hazen.

== Geology ==
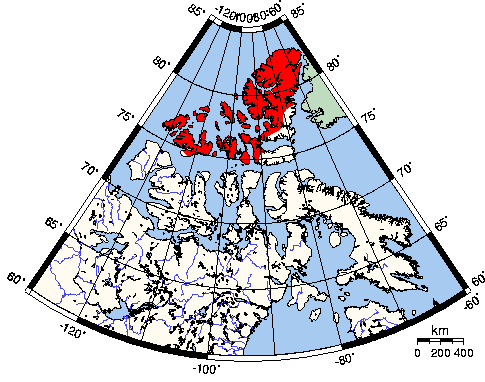
Innuitian Region (in red)

The Innuitian Mountains' present form was shaped during the Innuitian orogeny in the middle of the Mesozoic Era when the North American Plate moved northward. The Innuitian Mountains contain igneous and metamorphic rocks, but for the most part are composed of sedimentary rock. They are younger than the Appalachians, so erosion has not yet rounded them significantly.

The Innuitian Mountains resemble the Appalachian Mountains in composition and contain similar types of minerals. The mineral resources have not been greatly exploited, due to the cost of developing such a remote region while cheaper alternatives are available elsewhere. The amount of resources in the Arctic Region is estimated to have 13% of all the world's oil and 30% of the world's gas reserves.

== See also ==
- List of mountain ranges
