= Challenger Mountains =

Mountain range in Nunavut, Canada

- Map of Northern Ellesmere Island and far Northern Greenland

Highest point
- Peak: Commonwealth Mountain
- Elevation: 2,225 m (7,300 ft)
- Coordinates: 82°24′N 76°45′W

Dimensions
- Area: 14,892 km^{2} (5,750 mi^{2})

Geography
- Location within Nunavut
- Country: Canada
- Region: Nunavut
- Range coordinates: 82°41′N 076°12′W
- Parent range: Innuitian Mountains

Geology
- Orogeny: Innuitian
- Rock age: Mesozoic

The Challenger Mountains are a mountain range on Ellesmere Island in Nunavut, Canada. The range is the most northern range in the world and of the Arctic Cordillera. The highest mountain in the range is Commonwealth Mountain 2,225 m (7,300 ft). The United States Range is immediately to the east of the Challenger Mountains.

The range lies within Quttinirpaaq National Park, the second most northerly park in the world after Northeast Greenland National Park in Greenland.

Low elevation lakes located along Taconite Inlet are part of the Challenger Mountains and local relief exceeds 1,250 m (4,101 ft).
