= Mount Oxford (Nunavut) =

Mountain in Nunavut, Canada

- Location within Nunavut

Highest point
- Elevation: 2,210 m (7,250 ft)
- Prominence: 246 m (807 ft)
- Listing: Mountains of Canada
- Coordinates: 82°10′N 73°10′W

Geography
- Country: Canada
- Territory: Nunavut
- Parent range: British Empire Range
- Topo map: NTS 340E1 (untitled)

Climbing
- First ascent: 1 May 1935

Mount Oxford is located on Ellesmere Island, Nunavut, Canada and was named for the University of Oxford. The first known ascent was in 1935 by A. W. Moore (sometimes listed as Morris) and Nukapinguaq, a Greenlandic Inuk, during the Oxford University Ellesmere Land Expedition, when Moore estimated the height as 9,000 ft (2,743 m).

It was not until 1957, when it was climbed for the second time during the International Geophysical Year that an accurate height was obtained.
