= Arctic Lands =

Physiographic region in northern Canada

The Arctic Lands is a physiographic region located in northern Canada. It is one of Canada's seven physiographic regions, which is divided into three divisions—the Innuitian Region, Arctic Coastal Plain, and Arctic Lowlands.

== Physiographic region ==
Each of the three divisions is distinguished by topography and geology. The other physiographic regions are the Canadian Shield, the Hudson Bay Lowlands, the Interior Plains, the Cordillera, the Great Lakes–St. Lawrence Lowlands, and the Appalachian Uplands.

=== Innuitian region ===
There are two mountain zones in the Innuitian Region. In between lies a vast terrain with plateaus, uplands and lowlands.

=== Arctic Coastal Plain ===
The Arctic Coastal Plain includes its three divisions, Island Coastal Plain, Mackenzie Delta, and the Yukon Coastal Plain, each distinguished by physiographic characteristics.

=== Arctic Lowlands ===
The Lancaster Plateau, Foxe Plain, Boothia Plain, Victoria Lowland, and Shaler Mountains comprise the Arctic Lowlands. This includes parts of Ellesmere Island, Devon Island, Somerset Island and the Brodeur Peninsula.
