= Innuitian orogeny =

Major tectonic episode in the Canadian Arctic and Northernmost Greenland

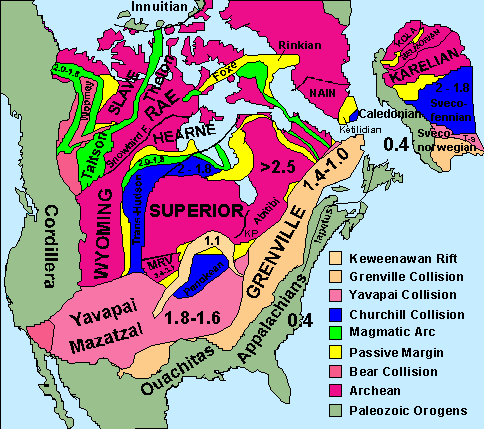
Innuitian orogen (the northernmost of the Paleozoic orogens shown in sage green) surrounded by the Slave and Rae cratons (fuchsia) that constitute the northern core of the North American craton (Laurentia)

The Innuitian orogeny, sometimes called the Ellesmere orogeny, was a major tectonic orogeny (mountain building episode) of the late Devonian to early Carboniferous, responsible for the formation of a series of mountain ranges in the Canadian Arctic and Northernmost Greenland. The episode started with the earliest Paleozoic rifting, extending from Ellesmere Island to Melville Island. However, the cause of the orogen remains poorly understood.

== See also ==
- Innuitian Mountains
- Roosevelt Range
