= Barbeau Peak =

Mountain in Nunavut, Canada

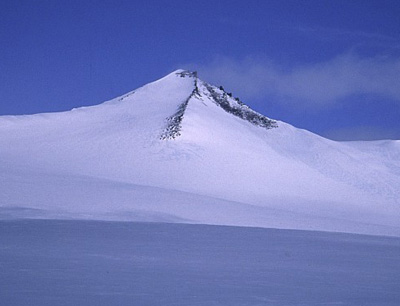
- Barbeau Peak as seen from its eastern side

Highest point
- Elevation: 2,616 m (8,583 ft)
- Prominence: 2,616 m (8,583 ft)
- Listing: Highest ocean islands 37th; North America prominent peaks 31st; North America isolated peaks 13th; Canada most prominent peaks 11th; Canada most isolated peaks 1st; Canadian Subnational High Points 5th
- Coordinates: 81°55′36″N 74°59′12″W

Geography
- Location within Nunavut
- Location: Ellesmere Island, Nunavut, Canada
- Parent range: British Empire Range
- Topo map: NTS 340D15 (untitled)

Climbing
- First ascent: June 5, 1967
- Easiest route: basic snow climb

Barbeau Peak is a mountain in Qikiqtaaluk, Nunavut, Canada. Located on Ellesmere Island within Quttinirpaaq National Park, it is the highest mountain in Nunavut and the Canadian Arctic.

== Geography and name ==
Barbeau Peak is characterized by deep and long crevasses, razor thin ridges and highly variable and volatile weather. It is the highest mountain within the British Empire Range, the Arctic Cordillera, and all of eastern North America.

The mountain was named in 1969 after Marius Barbeau, a Canadian anthropologist whose research into First Nations and Inuit cultures gained him international acclaim.

== Climbing history ==
Barbeau Peak was first climbed on 7 June 1967 by British geologist/glaciologist Geoffrey Hattersley-Smith as part of a joint Defence Research Board/Royal Air Force field party. The party both named the peak and determined its height.

The second ascent was by an eight-man American team in June 1982 (Errington, Trafton AAC 1983) via the north ridge. Subsequent ascents were made in 1992, 1998, 2000 and 2002, though as of 2006 only seven successful summits have been attained.

== Gallery ==
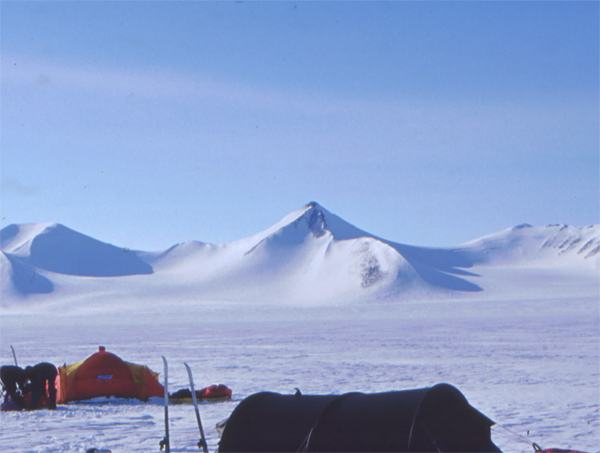
Barbeau Peak in 2002

== See also ==
- List of highest points of Canadian provinces and territories
- Mountain peaks of Canada
- List of Ultras of Canada
