= Pain management in children =

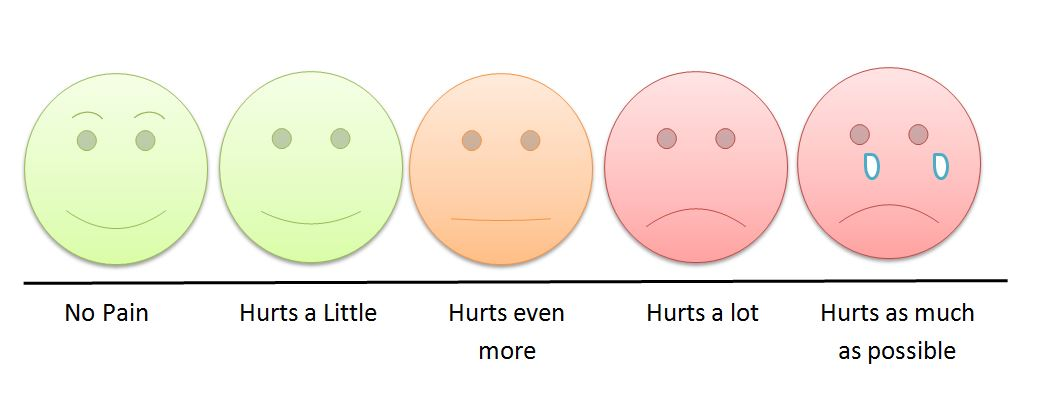
- Pain scale used in children
- Specialty: Pediatrics, anesthesia, palliative medicine

Pain management in children is the assessment and treatment of pain in infants and children.

== Types ==
=== Acute ===
Usually, acute pain usually has an obvious cause and is expected to last a few days or weeks. It is usually managed with medication and non-pharmacological treatment to provide comfort. Acute pain indicates assessment, treatment, and prevention are needed. While a child is experiencing pain, physiological consequences can jeopardize healing and recovery. Unrelieved pain can cause alkalosis and hypoxemia that result from rapid, shallow breathing. This shallow breathing can lead to fluid in the lungs, restricting coughing ability. Pain can cause an increase in blood pressure and heart rate, putting stress on the heart. Pain also increases the release of anti-inflammatory steroids that reduce the ability to fight infection, increase the metabolic rate, and affect healing. Another harmful outcome of acute pain is an increase in sympathetic output, such as the inability to urinate. Pain can also slow the gastrointestinal system.

Inadequate pain management in children can lead to psychosocial consequences, including lack of interest in food, apathy, sleep problems, anxiety, avoidance of discussions about health, fear, hopelessness, and powerlessness. Other consequences include extended hospital stays, high readmission rates, and longer recovery.

Examples of harmful consequences of unrelieved pain:

- Infants who have had more than average heel pricks can have poor cognitive and motor function;
- Associations of needles with felt distress may make later medical treatments more difficult;
- Children who have experienced invasive procedures often develop post-traumatic stress;
- Boys circumcised without anesthesia were found to have greater distress than uncircumcised boys;
- Severe pain as a child is associated with higher reports of pain in adults.

=== Neuropathic ===
Neuropathic pain is associated with nerve injuries and abnormal sensitivities to touch or contact. Although neuropathic pain is relatively uncommon in children compared to adults, greater awareness of these conditions is on the rise. Some causes may include past surgeries and amputations, autoimmune and degenerative neuropathies, and injury to the spinal cord.

Symptoms may include tingling, shooting, prickling, or burning sensation. The pain can be intermittent or constant and is often exacerbated in the evenings.

Neuropathic pain can be peripheral or central. Peripheral neuropathic pain refers to a disturbance in the function of peripheral nerves, while central neuropathic pain refers to nerves in the central nervous system.

Though not FDA-approved to address pain in children, anticonvulsants such as gabapentin and pregabalin have been used in severe neuropathic impairment. Other options are serotonin-norepinephrine reuptake inhibitors (SNRIs). Despite limited studies in children (limited to those with depression), SNRIs such as venlafaxine are effective.

=== Cancer pain ===
Cancer pain in children may be caused by the cancer itself or the side effects of treatment. Tumors can cause pain in two different ways: by the physical pressure they place on organs or by occluding normal bodily functions. Treatment such as surgery and injections can also lead to significant pain for the patient. If untreated, the pain can suppress the immune system, interfere with sleep, and increase risk of depression. Many different healthcare professionals will manage the child's pain and are referred to as the patient's palliative care team; these include oncologists, anesthesiologists, neurologists, surgeons, psychiatrists, and pharmacists. Hospitals may also hire individuals specializing in music or art therapy, including acupuncture, biofeedback, massage therapy, and hypnosis.

Treatment of the cancer pain is tailored to the child based on age, treatment, and side effects. The goal is to achieve sufficient background control of pain and minimize any acute exacerbation of severe pain. Often, medications such as nonsteroidal anti-inflammatory drugs (NSAIDs), acetaminophen, or opiates are used to manage the pain. Additionally, non-pharmacological modalities can also be used to manage the child's pain, including distracting the child, massages, acupuncture, heat/cold therapy, exercise, and quality sleep.

=== Chronic ===
Chronic pain in children is unresolved, affecting activities of daily living, and may result in a significant amount of missed school days. Chronic pain is present for long periods and is characterized as mild to severe. Chronic pain is also described as the pain experienced when the child reports a headache, abdominal pain, back pain, generalized pain, or a combination of these. Chronic pain can develop from disease or injury and co-occur with acute pain. Children who experience chronic pain can have psychological effects. Caring for a child in pain may cause distress to the caregiver, may cause costs due to healthcare or lost wages from time off work, and may stop caregivers from leaving the house.

== Diagnosis ==
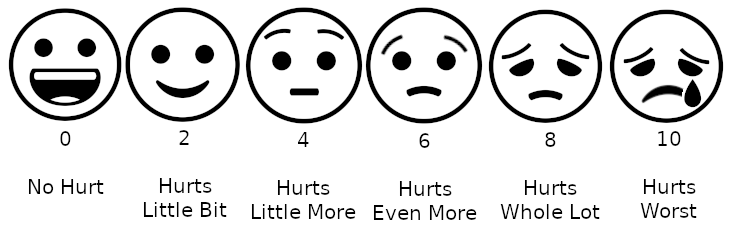
Example pain assessment chart based on the Wong–Baker Faces Pain Rating Scale

Assessment of pain in children depends on the cooperation and developmental stage of the child. Some children cannot assist in their assessment because they have not matured enough cognitively, emotionally, or physically. The following sections list signs of distress and possible pain in children by age group:

=== Younger infants ===
- Inability to distinguish the stimulus from the pain
- Ability to exhibit a reflexive response to pain
- Expressions of pain
  - Tightly closed eyes
  - Open mouth resembling a square rather than an oval or circle
  - Eyebrows lowered and tightly drawn together
- Rigid body
- Thrashing
- Loud crying
- Increase in heart rate, even while sleeping

=== Older infants ===
- Deliberate withdrawal from pain and possible guarding
- Loud crying
- Painful facial expressions

=== Toddlers ===
Toddlers show signs of distress and possible pain by:

- Expressing pain verbally
- Thrashing extremities
- Crying loudly
- Screaming
- Being uncooperative
- Palpating (examining with the hands) a source of pain
- Anticipating a pain-inducing procedure or event
- Requesting to be comforted
- Clinging to a significant person, possibly one perceived as protective

=== School-age children ===
School-age children show signs of distress and possible pain by:

- Anticipating the pain but less intensively, (understands concepts of time, i.e., imminent vs future pain)
- Stalling, trying to talk out of the situation where pain is anticipated
- Having muscular rigidity

=== Adolescent ===
Adolescents show signs of distress and possible pain:

- With muscle tension, but with control
- With verbal expressions and descriptions

=== Quantitative pain assessment ===
Although pain is subjective and can occur in a continuous spectrum of intensities, there are assessment tools that compare pain levels over time. This kind of assessment incorporates pain scales and requires a high enough developmental level for the child to respond to questions. A verbal response is not always necessary to quantify pain.

=== Pain scales ===
A pain scale measures a patient's pain intensity and other features. Pain scales can be based on observational (behavioral) or physiological data, as well as self-report. Self-report is considered primary and should be obtained if possible. Pain measurements help determine the severity, type, and duration of pain. They are also used in diagnosis, to determine a treatment plan, and to evaluate the effectiveness of treatment. Pain scales are available for neonates, infants, children, adolescents, adults, seniors, and persons with impaired communication. Pain assessments are often regarded as "the 5th vital sign".

Examples of pain scales
	Self-report	Observational	Physiological
Infant	—	Premature Infant Pain Profile; Neonatal/Infant Pain Scale	—
Child	Wong-Baker Faces Pain Rating Scale – Revised; Coloured Analogue Scale	FLACC (Face Legs Arms Cry Consolability Scale); CHEOPS (Children's Hospital of Eastern Ontario Pain Scale)	Comfort
Adolescent	Visual analogue scale (VAS); Verbal Numerical Rating Scale (VNRS); Verbal Descriptor Scale (VDS); Brief Pain Inventory	—	—

== Causes ==
The causes of pain in children are similar to the causes in adults.

Pain can be experienced in many ways and depends on the following factors in each child:

- Prior painful episodes or treatments
- Age and developmental stage
- Disease or type of trauma
- Personality
- Culture
- Socioeconomic status
- Presence of family members and family dynamics.

=== During treatment ===
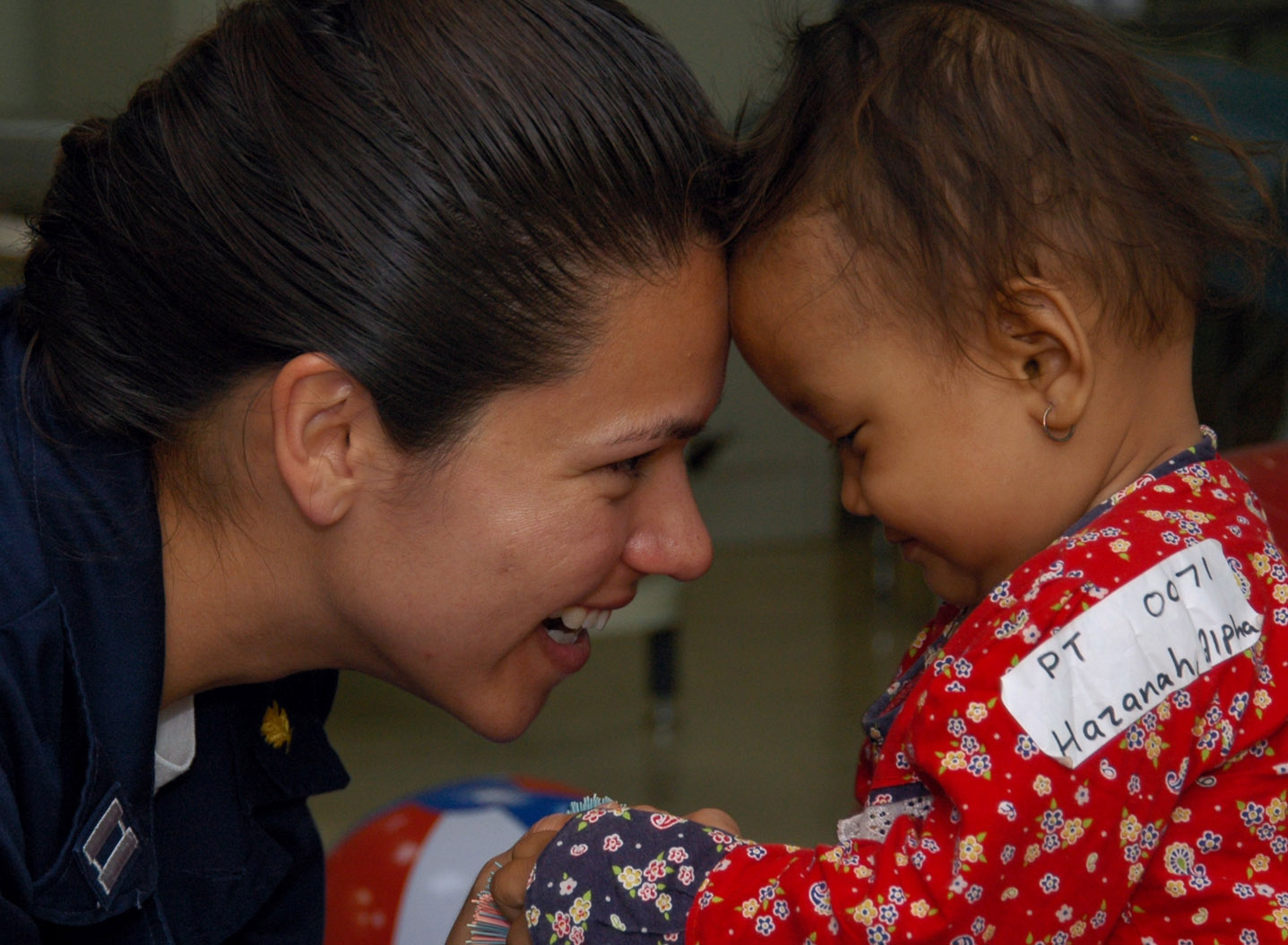
A physical therapist uses play as part of a child's treatment plan.

Clinicians responsible for a child monitor the child frequently in tertiary care centers (hospitals). Pharmacological and non-pharmacological treatments are used to manage the pain. Parents or caregivers are also requested to provide their own pain assessments. At the beginning of pharmacological treatment, clinicians monitor the child for adverse reactions to the medications. The levels of some medications are monitored to ensure that the child is not overmedicated and does not receive toxic levels of any drug. The levels also indicate whether there would be enough drug in the blood to be effective in managing the pain. Medications are metabolized differently between children of the same age. Factors that influence the levels of medications controlling pain include the height, weight, and body surface of the child, as well as any other illnesses. Some medications may have a paradoxical effect in children, which is an effect that is the opposite of the expected effect. Clinicians monitor for this and any other reactions to medication.

=== After treatment ===
Post-procedural treatment in children is primarily prescription opioids. Morphine is effective and relatively safe, and is often used with moderate to severe pain. Codeine and tramadol should be avoided especially in children younger than 12 years old since metabolism varies due to genetic differences between individuals, and, in the case of tramadol, this medication has not been well studied in children. However, other interventions include medications classified as non-opioid analgesics, which are useful in post surgical treatment. For example, acetaminophen or ibuprofen can be used as a non-opioid analgesics. Unlike acetaminophen, ibuprofen has anti-inflammatory property which can be useful for pain in inflammatory conditions. Aspirin is not used in pediatric population due to its association with Reye's syndrome.

== Management ==
=== Atraumatic measures ===
Because children process information differently from adults, treatment centers for children often use atraumatic measures to reduce anxiety and stress. Examples include:

- Allowing the parent or caregiver to be present for painful procedures
- Using a treatment room for painful procedures to ensure that the child's room is a place where little pain can be expected
- Establishing other "pain-free zones" where no medical procedures are allowed, such as a playroom
- Offering choices to the child to give them some control over the procedures
- Modelling procedures with dolls and toys
- Using age-appropriate anatomical terms and other vocabulary.

=== Non-pharmacological ===
Depending on the source of pain, there are many non-pharmacological options to be considered. Also, depending on the age of the child, different approaches may be more suitable.

Non-pharmacological methods to manage discomfort during immunizations or painful procedures in young babies (up to 12 months of age):

- Oral treatment with a sweet-tasting solution: This can be done either by sucking on a soother (pacifier) or by placing a small amount of sweet-tasting solution in their mouths
- Comforting the baby during and after the injection
- Breastfeeding during painful procedures has been found to be more effective in controlling pain than placebo or positioning. Breastmilk or 'sugar' water has a similar effect, though studies in preterm infants have yet to be done.
- Skin-to-skin care (kangaroo care) is thought be effective for pain control during painful procedures.
- Gently rocking the baby
- Swaddling
- Suckling (non nutritive)

Non-pharmacological treatments for older children include:

- Carefully explaining a procedure with pictures or other visual aids
- Letting the child choose the injection site.
- Chest-to-chest hugging
- Allowing the child to ask questions of medical staff
- Touring the place where the procedures will occur
- Allowing small children to play with dolls or other toys with a clinician to understand the procedure
- Allowing older children to watch a video that explains the procedure
- Providing distraction with songs, stories, toys, color, videos, TV, or music
- Using relaxation techniques such as deep breathing or massage

Non-pharmacological treatment for pain associated with venipuncture in children includes hypnosis and distraction. These treatments reduced self-reported pain and when combined with cognitive-behavioural therapy (CBT) the reduction of pain was even greater. Other interventions have not been found to be effective and these are suggestion, blowing out air, and distraction with parent coaching did not differ from control for pain and distress.

For children and adolescents who experience chronic pain- behavioral treatment, relaxation training, cognitive behavioral therapy (CBT) and acupuncture have been proven to be effective for some patients. For recurrent abdominal pain a 2017 Cochrane review found some evidence that CBT and hypnotherapy were effective in reducing pain for the short term.

For children over one year of age, there is no strong evidence to suggest that eating or sucking on a sweet tasting solution has an analgesic effect.

=== Medication ===
Acute pain, chronic pain, neuropathic pain and recurrent pain in children is most often managed with medication. Most of these medications are analgesics. These include acetaminophen, NSAIDs, local anesthetics, opioids, and medications for neuropathic pain. Regional anesthesia is also effective and recommended whenever possible. It is important to use caution when administering opioids to neonates and young infants. There is a higher risk for apnea and hypoventilation in this population, due to their decreased breathing response. The effectiveness and adverse effects associated with the use of the injectable NSAID ketorolac postoperatively or following or during surgery is not clear due to insufficient quantity and quality of evidence. It is not clear from clinical trials if it is more effective to provide pain control around the clock or provide pain relief as needed for children recovering from surgery.

=== Chronic pain treatment ===
Chronic pain is treated with a variety of medications and non-pharmacological interventions. The World Health Organization recommends using a two step treatment approach based on the level of pain in children. The first step explains mild pain treatment, while the second step considers moderate to severe pain. Opioids, such as morphine, is an example of a drug of choice for moderate-severe pain in children with medical illnesses. Some side effects of opioid use can include cognition deficits, dependence, altered mood, and disturbances of endocrine development.

Non-pharmacological treatment for children to help relieve periodic pain includes counseling and behavior modification therapy. The American Association of Pediatrics states that psychological interventions, such as relaxation and cognitive strategies, have strong evidence for pain management.

=== Acute pain treatment ===
The approach to acute pain should take into account the severity of the pain. Non-opioid analgesics, such as paracetamol (acetaminophen) and NSAIDs, can be used alone to treat mild pain. For moderate to severe pain, it is optimal to use a combination of multiple agents, including opioid and non-opioid agents.

==== Postoperative pain ====
A panel, including the American Pain Society and American Society of Regional Anesthesia and Pain Medicine, recommends multimodal analgesia, which they define as a combination of pharmacological agents and non-pharmacological techniques to treat postoperative pain. A significant benefit of this technique is that non-opioid analgesics used in combination with opioids can decrease the amount of opioids required and reduce the risk of opioid-related side effects. Medications can be delivered as needed or around-the-clock depending on the patient's needs. For children, intravenous patient-controlled analgesia (IV-PCA) can be used when parenteral administration is preferred. IV-PCA allows for consistent opioid levels, which can be a better alternative to scheduled intramuscular injections. In addition, studies have shown that children as young as 6 years old can use the IV-PCA correctly.

==== Dental pain ====
For projected moderate to severe pain, analgesics can be used on a regular schedule for the first 36 to 48 hours after a dental procedure. NSAIDs are preferred over other analgesics to treat acute mild to moderate postoperative pain, due to the inflammatory component of dental pain. Alternating between the NSAIDs and acetaminophen in combination is another option. In addition, these two agents are considered equivalent or better than opioids for managing musculoskeletal pain, which includes dental pain.

=== Cancer pain ===
Cancer pain is managed differently in children. Typically, medical history, physical examinations, age and overall health of the child are evaluated. The type of cancer may influence decisions about pain management. The extent of the cancer, and the tolerance of the child to specific medications, procedures or therapies are also taken into account, as well as the preferences of the parent or caregiver. Medications used to treat cancer pain include non-steroidal anti-inflammatory drugs (NSAIDs) and opioids.

==== Non-steroidal anti-inflammatory drugs (NSAIDs) ====
Non-steroidal anti-inflammatory drugs (NSAIDs):

- Used as treatment for pain and as an anti-inflammatory.
- Can be administered as oral tablet or liquid.
- It is recommended to use the lowest dose and shortest duration possible to control pain.
- NSAIDs are not approved for infants under 3 months old.
- General adverse effects for NSAIDs:
  - Renal impairment
  - Hepatic impairment
  - Gastrointestinal issues (nausea, diarrhea, constipation, flatulence)
  - Dyspepsia
  - Rash
  - Dizziness
  - Abdominal pain
- Contraindicated for:
  - Hypersensitivity reactions
  - Cardiac impairment
  - Reye's syndrome
  - Coagulation defects
- Ibuprofen 5–10 mg/kg every 6–8 hours (Max dose 1200 mg/day)

==== Opioids ====
Opioids:

- Doses are based on the child's body weight.
- They can be administered as oral, parenteral, buccal, transdermal, nasal or rectal formulations.
- It is recommended to start at a low dose and titrate up to effect.
- General adverse effects for opioids:
  - Constipation
  - Hives
  - Nausea
  - Vomiting
  - Pruritus
  - Respiratory depression

The frequency of prescribing for these pain medications has more than doubled from 1990 to 2010 with 20-50% of adolescents who complain of headache, back pain, or joint pain receiving a prescribed opioid.

Before an adolescent or young adult is prescribed opioids, they should be screened for risk factors for opioid drug abuse. Prescription drug monitoring programs (PDMs) are now available in 37 states and 11 states have programs in development.

The use of opioids can result in a number of complications in children, including respiratory depression and risk for unintended overdose and opioid misuse later in life. These risks can be reduced by the use of NSAIDs (e.g. ibuprofen) and paracetamol. Using NSAIDs and paracetamol can be opioid-sparing, leading to less opioid use in situations such as peri-operative pain management. The efficacy and safety of opioids in children have not been established.

A 2014 Cochrane Review for nalbuphine for postoperative pain treatment in children, reported insufficient evidence of the efficacy and adverse events of nalbuphine in this population; further research is needed in this area.

Other side effects of opioids are constipation, fatigue, and disorientation. Children can develop opioid tolerance, where larger doses are needed to have the same effect. Tolerance occurs earlier in children than in adults, especially with prolonged use. When tolerance to opioids develop, it takes a larger dose of the opioid to achieve the same analgesic effect. Non-pharmacological treatments have few side effects.

=== Treatment for children and adolescents with conditions that are life limiting ===
For children with lifelimiting conditions including cancer, the evidence supporting or refuting specific treatment approaches is very weak.

== Society and culture ==
The indications that treatment is needed are not always clear for children because of poor assessments and the tendency to undertreat pain.

Misconceptions about pain in children
Incorrect	Valid	References
Infants cannot sense pain like adults	Nerve pathways exist at birth, albeit immature Newborns experience physiological changes and surges in hormones that indicate stress	
Infants cannot feel pain because their nerve fibers are not myelinated	Complete myelination is not necessary for the transmission of pain impulses to the brain	
Young children cannot indicate where pain originates	Young children may have the cognitive ability to use a body chart and explain where their pain is coming from	
A child able to sleep must not be in pain	Sleep occurs because of exhaustion	

== Research ==
The use of virtual reality devices has been suggested as a non pharmacological option for distracting children during certain painful procedures, however, further research is required to determine if this approach is effective and also to identify any unwanted effects. The effectiveness and potential side effects or adverse effects associated with many commonly used pain medications in children and adolescents such as paracetamol have not been well studied in the pediatric population as most of the high quality studies showing effectiveness have been conducted in adults.

== See also ==
- Pain management

== Bibliography ==
- Henry N (2016). RN nursing care of children: review module. Stilwell, KS: Assessment Technologies Institute. ISBN 978-1-56533-571-4.
- Roberts M (2017). Handbook of pediatric psychology. New York: The Guilford Press. ISBN 978-1-4625-2978-0.
- Twycross A (2014). Managing pain in children: a clinical guide for nurses and healthcare professionals. Hoboken: Wiley Blackwell. ISBN 978-0-470-67054-5.
