= Face (disambiguation) =

The face is a part of the body, the front of the head.

Face may also refer to:

== Generic meanings ==
- Face (geometry), a flat (planar) surface that forms part of the boundary of a solid object
- Face (hieroglyph), a portrayal of the human face, frontal view.
- Face (mining), the surface where the mining work is advancing
- Face (sociological concept), dignity or prestige in social relations
- Face (graph theory)
- Clock face
- Rock face, a cliff or vertical surface on a large rock or mountain, especially a pyramidal peak
- Typeface in typography

== Books and publications ==
- Face (novel), a novel by Benjamin Zephaniah
- The Face (Vance novel), a 1979 science fiction novel by Jack Vance
- The Face (Koontz novel), a 2003 novel by Dean Koontz
- The Face (Whitaker novel), a 2002 novel by Phil Whitaker
- The Face (magazine), a British music, fashion, and culture magazine
- The Face, a novel by Angela Elwell Hunt
- Face (character), a 1940s Columbia Comics superhero

== Film and TV ==
=== Films ===
- The Magician (1958 film) or The Face
- The Face (1996 film), an American television film
- Face (1997 film), a British crime drama by Antonia Bird
- Face (2000 film), a Japanese dark comedy by Junji Sakamoto and starring Naomi Fujiyama
- Face (2002 film), an American drama by Bertha Bay-Sa Pan and starring Bai Ling
- Face (2004 film), a Korean horror film by Yoo Sang-gon
- Face (2009 film), a Taiwanese-French comedy-drama by Tsai Ming-liang
- FACE Film Award of the Council of Europe, a human-rights award bestowed at the Istanbul International Film Festival

=== Television ===
- The Face (TV series), a multinational reality modeling-themed show
  - The Face (American TV series), the original series
  - The Face (Australian TV series)
  - The Face Thailand
  - The Face (British TV series)
  - The Face (Vietnamese TV series)
- "Face" (Ghost in the Shell episode)
- Face (Nick Jr. mascot)
- Templeton Peck or Face, a character in The A-Team

== Music ==
=== Performers ===
- Face (a cappella group), an American rock a cappella group
- The Face (band), a Chinese rock band formed in 1989
- Face (musician), a member of So Solid Crew
- Face (rapper) (born 1997), Russian rapper
- David Morales or the Face (born 1961), American house music DJ and producer

=== Albums ===
- Face (Of Cabbages and Kings album), 1988
- Face (Key album), 2018
- Face (Jimin album), 2023
- Face, a 2006 album by Kenna
- The Face: The Very Best of Visage, a 2010 album by Visage
- Face (EP), a 2022 EP by Solar
- The Face (album), a 2008 album by BoA
- The Face (EP), a 2012 EP by Disclosure

=== Songs ===
- "Face" (song), a song by Brockhampton
- "Face", a song by Got7 from 7 for 7
- "Face", a song by Jennie from Fallen Angel
- "Face", a song by Rick Ross (featuring Trina) from Deeper Than Rap
- "Face", a song by Sevendust from Sevendust
- "The Face", a 1990 song by And Why Not?
- "The Face", ' a 1974 song by Gentle Giant from The Power and the Glory

== Other ==
- Chery A1 Chery Face, a compact car produced by Chery Automobile
- The Face, the world's first-ever 8a+ graded rock climb by Jerry Moffatt
- Face (professional wrestling), a hero character, meant to appeal to wrestling fans

== Acronyms ==
- FACE, Families Advocating for Campus Equality, a non-profit organization in the United States
- Fellow of the Australian College of Educators
- First Aid Convention Europe, a Red Cross event
- Federal Agency for Civic Education, a German government agency
- Federation of Associations for Hunting and Conservation of the EU, an advocacy group in the European Union
- Femmes algériennes pour un changement vers l'égalité, an Algerian feminist group created during the 2019 Hirak protests
- Fine Arts Core Education, a fine-arts school in Montreal, Quebec, Canada
- Fondation Agir Contre l'Exclusion, a private foundation in France
- Foundation for Arts, Culture and Education in Pakistan
- Fluorophore-assisted carbohydrate electrophoresis, a biochemical technology
- Free-air concentration enrichment, a technology to test the effect of rising CO_{2}-levels on the production of plant biomass
- Freedom of Access to Clinic Entrances Act, a federal law in the United States
- Functional Analysis of Care Environments, a commercial tool for mental health risk assessment
- Future Airborne Capability Environment, a standards-based computing environment for aviation platforms
- FACE, a mnemonic for notes in the treble clef

== People with the surname ==
- Richard Face (1942–2023), Australian politician
- Roy Face (1928–2026), American former Major League Baseball relief pitcher

== See also ==
- About Face (disambiguation)
- Bald face (disambiguation)
- Captain Face, in the 1610 play The Alchemist by Ben Jonson
- Face Down (disambiguation)
- Faces (disambiguation)
- Facing (disambiguation)
- Front (disambiguation)
