= Faces (disambiguation) =

Faces are the front areas of heads.

Faces may also refer to:

== Computing and Internet ==
- Faces (video game), a 1990 computer game
- Faces (online community), an online community of women interested in digital media
- JavaServer Faces, a Java-based Web application framework for interfaces
- faces for Unix, the continuation of vismon

== Film and television ==
- Faces (1934 film), a British drama film
- Faces (1968 film), a film by John Cassavetes
- "Faces" (Star Trek: Voyager), an episode of Star Trek: Voyager
- "Faces", an episode of The Good Doctor

== Music ==
- Faces (band), a British rock band active in the early 1970s
- Faces (festival), a music festival in Raseborg, Finland since 1998

=== Albums ===
- Faces (Chris Caffery album) (2005)
- Faces (Clarke-Boland Big Band album) (1969)
- Faces (David Lyttle album) (2015)
- Faces (Earth, Wind & Fire album) (1980)
- Faces (EP), by Residual Kid (2012)
- Faces (Gábor Szabó album) (1977)
- Faces (Irma album) (2014)
- Faces (John Berry album) (1996)
- Faces (mixtape), by Mac Miller (2014)
- Faces (Mt. Helium album) (2008)

=== Songs ===
- "Faces" (2 Unlimited song) (1993)
- "Faces" (Candyland and Shoffy song) (2016)
- "Faces" (Nik Kershaw song) (1984)
- "Faces" (Run-D.M.C. song) (1991)
- "Faces", by Clio (Maria Chiara Perugini) (1985)
- "Faces", by Cat Power from Myra Lee (1996)
- "Faces", by Gavin James (2019)
- "Faces", by Night Ranger from 7 Wishes (1985)
- "Faces", by Scary Kids Scaring Kids from their eponymous album (2007)
- "Faces", by Young Thug from Punk (2021)

== See also ==
- Face (disambiguation)
- Faeces
- Wong-Baker Faces Pain Rating Scale
