= Facing =

Facing may refer to:

- Facing (machining), a turning operation often carried out on a lathe
- Facing (retail), a common tool in the retail industry to create the look of a perfectly stocked store
- Facing (sewing), fabric applied to a garment edge on the underside
- Facing (TV series), an American docudrama series
- Facing colour or facings, a tailoring technique for European military uniforms where the visible inside lining of a standard military jacket, coat or tunic is of a different colour to that of the garment itself

== See also ==
- Face (disambiguation)
