= Pain Assessment in Advanced Dementia =

Pain Assessment in Advanced Dementia (PAINAD)
- Purpose: assess pain experienced by those with dementia

Pain Assessment in Advanced Dementia (PAINAD) is a pain scale developed by Victoria Warden, Ann C. Hurley, and Ladislav Volicer to provide a universal method of analysing the pain experienced by people in late stage dementia.

Behavior	0	1	2	Score
Breathing independent of vocalization	Normal	Occasional laboured breathing, short period of hyperventilation	Noisy, laboured breathing, long period of hyperventilation, Cheyne-Stokes respirations	
Negative vocalization	None	Occasional moans or groans, low-level speech with a negative or disapproving quality	Repeated troubled calling out, loud moaning or groaning, crying	
Facial expression	Smiling or inexpressive	Sad, frightened, frown	Facial grimacing	
Body language	Relaxed	Tense, distressed pacing, fidgeting	Rigid, fists clenched, knees pulled up, pulling or pushing away, striking out	
Consolability	No need to console	Distracted or reassured by voice or touch	Unable to console, distract, or reassure	

"The total score ranges from 0-10 points. A possible interpretation of the scores is: 1-3=mild pain; 4-6=moderate pain; 7-10=severe pain."

== See also ==
- FLACC scale - a pain scale for children
