= Dan Rather =

American broadcast journalist (born 1931)

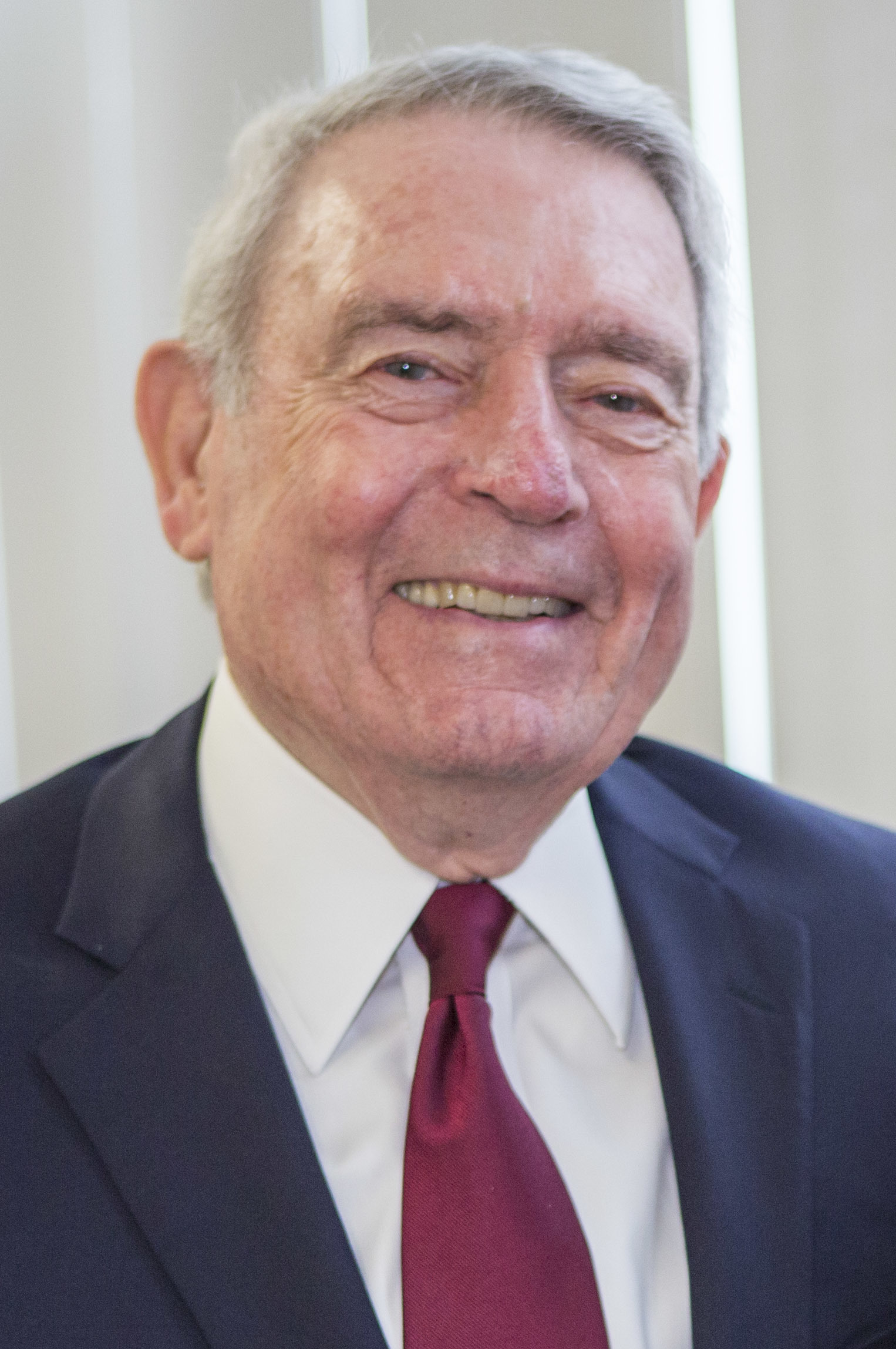
- Rather in 2017
- Born: Daniel Irvin Rather Jr. October 31, 1931 (age 95); Wharton, Texas, U.S.
- Education: Sam Houston State University (BA)
- Occupations: Journalist; news presenter; reporter and correspondent
- Years active: 1950–present
- Spouse: Jean Goebel (m. 1957; died 2024)
- Children: 2

Daniel Irvin Rather Jr. (born October 31, 1931) is an American journalist, commentator, and former national evening news anchor. He began his career in Texas, becoming a national name in September 1961 after his reporting saved thousands of lives during Hurricane Carla. He has reported on some of the most significant events of the modern age, such as from Afghanistan during the Soviet invasion, the fall of the Berlin Wall, the Gulf War, 9/11, the Iraq War, and the war on terror.

Rather also famously reported from Dallas in November 1963 at the time that President John F. Kennedy had been assassinated. Based on such reporting, he was promoted at CBS News, where he served as White House correspondent beginning in 1964. He served as foreign correspondent in London and Vietnam over the next two years before returning to the White House correspondent position. He covered the presidency of Richard Nixon, including Nixon's trip to China, the Watergate scandal, and the president's resignation.

In 1981, Rather was promoted to news anchor for the CBS Evening News, a role he occupied for 24 years. Along with Peter Jennings at ABC News and Tom Brokaw at NBC News, he was one of the "Big Three" nightly news anchors in the United States from the 1980s through the early 2000s. He frequently contributed to CBS's weekly news magazine, 60 Minutes.

Rather left the anchor desk in 2005 following the Killian documents controversy, in which he presented unauthenticated documents in a news report on President George W. Bush's Vietnam War–era service in the National Guard. He continued to work with CBS until 2006, when he was dismissed.

In September 2007, Rather filed a $70 million lawsuit against CBS and its former parent company Viacom. Rather accused the network and its ownership and management of making him a scapegoat in the Killian story. An intermediate New York state appeals court dismissed the lawsuit in September 2009, and the New York Court of Appeals refused to reinstate it in January 2010.

On the cable channel AXS TV (then called HDNet), Rather hosted Dan Rather Reports, a 60 Minutes–style investigative news program, from 2006 to 2013. He also hosts several other projects for AXS TV, including Dan Rather Presents, which provides in-depth reporting on broad topics such as mental health care or adoption, and The Big Interview with Dan Rather, in which he conducts long-form interviews with musicians and other entertainers. In January 2018, he began hosting an online newscast called The News with Dan Rather on the Young Turks YouTube channel. Since 2021, he has been writing the newsletter "Steady" on the Substack platform, with 170 posts in 2024.

== Early life ==
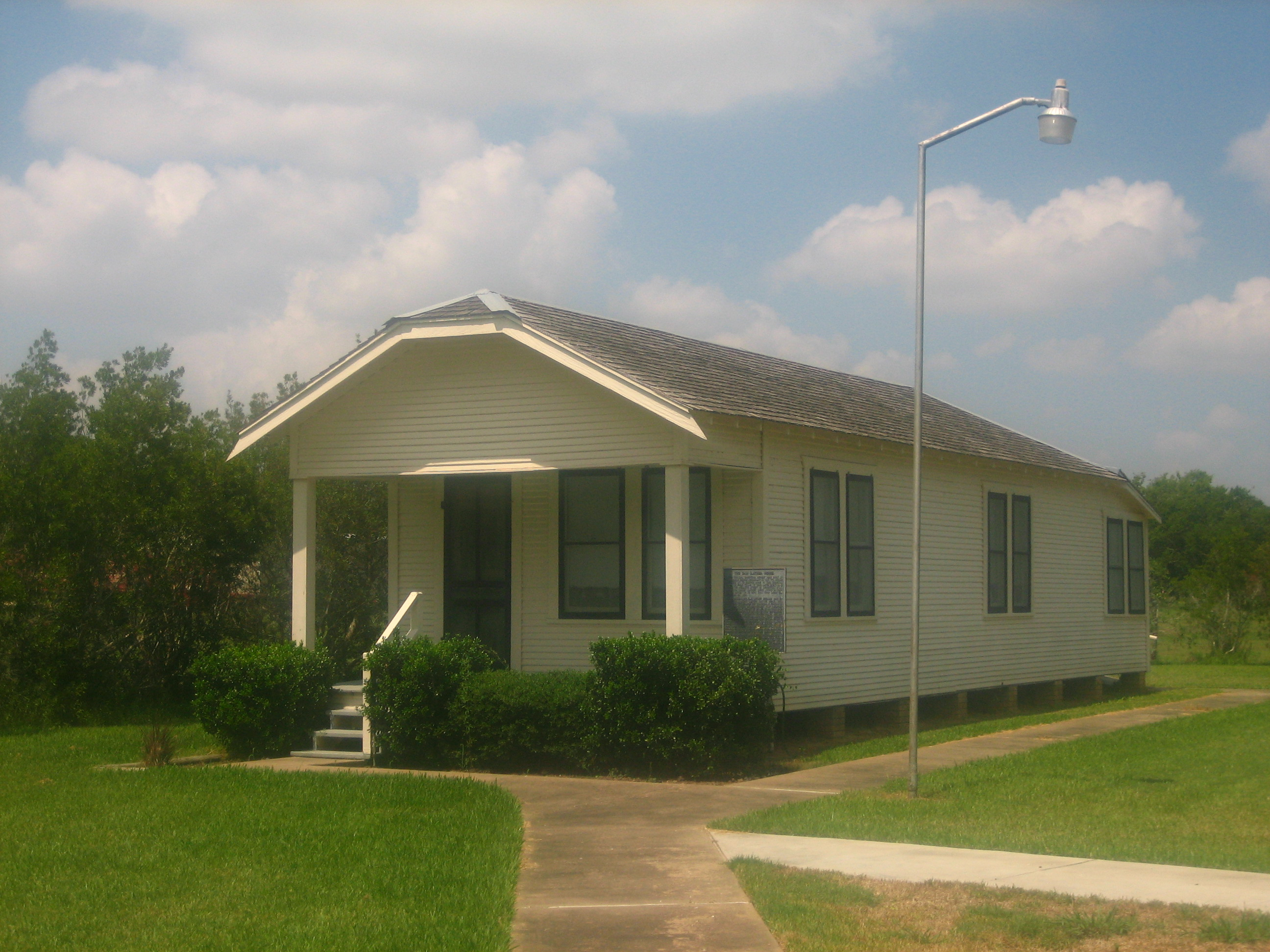
Rather's boyhood home being restored at the Wharton County Museum

Rather was born on October 31, 1931, in Wharton County, Texas, the son of Daniel Irvin Rather Sr., a ditch digger and pipe layer, and the former Byrl Veda Page. Neither of his parents completed high school; however, they were avid readers. The Rathers moved to Houston when he was a child, where Dan attended Lovett Elementary School and Hamilton Middle School. He graduated in 1950 from John H. Reagan High School in Houston where he played football. Rather aspired to be a reporter, and his mother encouraged him to attend college and to become the first person in the family to earn a college degree. He hitchhiked to Sam Houston State Teachers College in Huntsville, Texas and walked on to the school's football team.

When he did not earn an athletic scholarship, Rather turned his focus to journalism and found part-time jobs to pay for tuition. In 1953, Rather earned a bachelor's degree in journalism, and he was editor of the school newspaper, The Houstonian. He was also a member of the Caballeros, the founding organization of the Epsilon Psi chapter of the Sigma Chi fraternity. While in college, Rather worked for KSAM-FM radio in Huntsville, calling junior high, high school, and Sam Houston State football games. After obtaining his undergraduate degree, Rather briefly attended South Texas College of Law in Houston.

In January 1954, Rather enlisted in the United States Marine Corps and was sent to Marine Corps Recruit Depot San Diego. He was soon discharged, however, because he was found to have had rheumatic fever as a child, a fact he had omitted during the enlistment process.

== Early career ==
Rather began his journalism career in 1950 as an Associated Press reporter in Huntsville, Texas. Later, he was a reporter for United Press (1950–1952), several Texas radio stations, and the Houston Chronicle (1954–1955). Around 1955, Rather wrote a piece on heroin. Under the auspices of the Houston Police, he tried a dose of the drug, which he characterized as "a special kind of hell".

Rather worked for four seasons as the play-by-play announcer for the University of Houston football team. During the 1959 minor league baseball season, Rather was the play-by-play radio announcer for the Texas League Houston Buffs.

In 1959, Rather began his television career as part of a weekly Coaches Show for the University of Houston on KTRK-TV, the ABC affiliate in Houston. In 1960, he was hired as the 6:00 p.m. and 10:00 p.m. news anchor and director of news for KHOU-TV, the local CBS affiliate.

In September 1961, Rather covered Hurricane Carla for KHOU-TV, broadcasting from the then National Weather Center in Galveston and showing the first radar image of a hurricane on TV. He conceived of overlaying a transparent map over the radar screen, to show the size of Hurricane Carla to the audience. Convinced of the threat, more than 350,000 people evacuated from the area, the largest known evacuation to that time. Their actions are believed to have saved thousands of lives compared to the previous hurricane, which had killed 6,000 to 12,000 people. Rather's live coverage of Carla was broadcast by New York and national stations. Ray Miller, news director of KPRC-TV, the NBC affiliate in Houston, also mentored Rather in his early years.

On February 28, 1962, Rather left Houston for New York City for a six-month trial initiation at CBS. Rather did not fit in easily on the East Coast. His first report for CBS included radio coverage of the crash of American Airlines Flight 1 in Jamaica Bay, and a story on the accidental deaths of newborns who were served salt in their formula at Binghamton General Hospital in Binghamton, New York, referred to years later as the Salt Babies. Shortly after, Rather was made chief of CBS's Southwest bureau in Dallas. In August 1963, he was appointed chief of the Southern bureau in New Orleans, responsible for coverage of news events in the South, Southwest, Mexico and Central America.

== CBS News ==
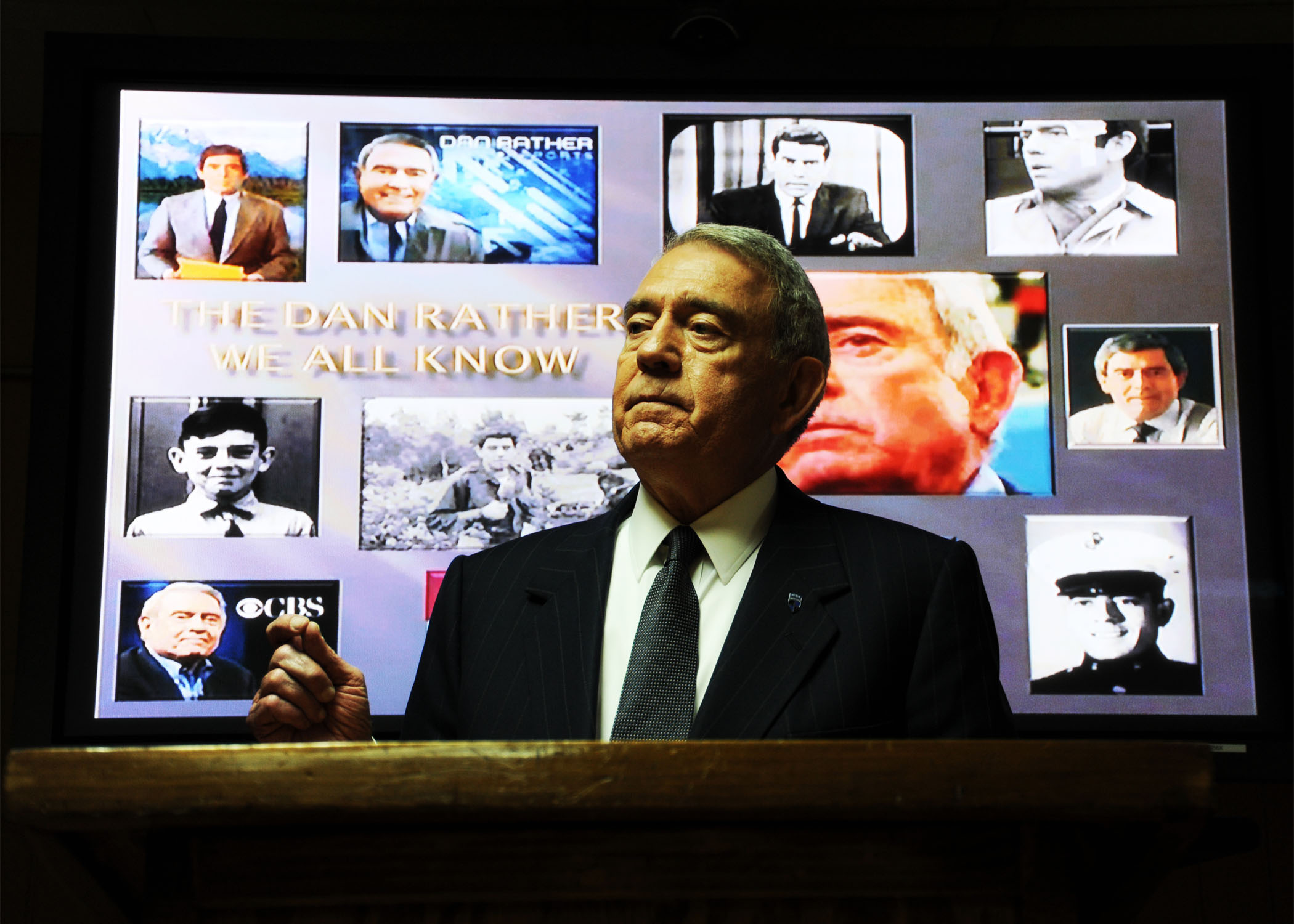
Rather speaking about his experiences in his 61 years of journalism before a group of NATO commanders at Camp Eggers in Kabul, Afghanistan in July 2011.

=== JFK assassination to Watergate ===
In his autobiography, Rather noted that he was in Dallas in November 1963 to return film from an interview in Uvalde at the ranch of former Vice President John Nance Garner, who celebrated his 95th birthday on November 22. He happened to be "on the other side of the railroad tracks, beyond the triple underpass, thirty yards from a grassy knoll that would later figure in so many conspiracy theories". His job was to fetch a film drop from a camera truck at that location, and take it to the station for editing. He did not witness the shooting of Kennedy, and knew nothing of the events until he reached KRLD, having run through Dealey Plaza. He later wrote:

The moment I cleared the railroad tracks I saw a scene I will never forget. Some people were lying on the grass, some screaming, some running, some pointing. Policemen swarmed everywhere and distinctly above the din, I heard one shout, "DON'T ANYBODY PANIC." And of course, there was nothing but panic wherever you looked.

In his autobiography, Rather said he was one of the first to view the Zapruder film showing the assassination, and the first to describe it on television. Rather reported the fatal headshot as forcing Kennedy's head forward, but it was thrown backward.

Later, he reported that some Dallas schoolchildren had applauded when they were notified of the president's death. Administrators said they had announced that school was to be dismissed early, and did not mention the assassination. However, teacher Joanna Morgan confirmed that students had cheered at the news that Kennedy was shot. This story infuriated local journalists at then-CBS affiliate KRLD-TV (now Fox-owned-and-operated KDFW-TV).

Rather's reporting during the national mourning period following the Kennedy assassination and subsequent events impressed CBS News management. In 1964, they selected him for the network's White House correspondent position. When White House correspondent, he contributed to the subsequent events following the Kennedy assassination. In 1965, he contributed to the reporting of return to Washington from Dallas by Charles von Fremd during a conversation that NBC Director Max Schindler, who directed the coverage of the arrival for the networks, did with President Lyndon B. Johnson, at the White House for the TV networks.

In 1965, Rather served as a foreign correspondent for CBS in London, and in 1966 in Vietnam. He served again as White House correspondent during the presidency of Richard Nixon. In 1970, he was also assigned as anchor for the CBS Sunday Night News (1970–73; 1974–75), and later for the CBS Saturday Evening News (1973–76) and rotated with Bob Schieffer on the CBS Sunday "Evening News" (1976). Rather was among those journalists who accompanied Nixon to China. He later covered the Watergate investigation, as well as the impeachment proceedings against Richard Nixon in Congress.

=== CBS Evening News anchor ===
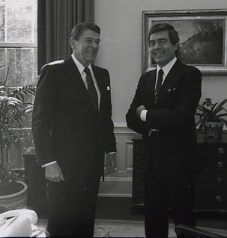
Rather (right) with president Ronald Reagan in 1982

After President Nixon's resignation in 1974, Rather became chief correspondent for the documentary series CBS Reports. In December 1975, he became a correspondent of the long-running Sunday night news show 60 Minutes—at the time the program was moved from a Sunday afternoon time-slot to primetime. Success there helped Rather pull ahead of longtime correspondent Roger Mudd, who was in line to succeed Walter Cronkite as anchor and Managing Editor of The CBS Evening News.

Good evening. President Reagan, still training his spotlight on the economy, today signed a package of budget cuts that he will send to Congress tomorrow. Lesley Stahl has the story.

— Rather's first lines in his debut as anchor of The CBS Evening News

Rather succeeded to the news anchor position after Cronkite's retirement, making his first broadcast on March 9, 1981. Rather had a significantly different style of reporting the news. In contrast to the avuncular Cronkite, who ended his newscast with "That's the way it is," Rather searched to find a broadcast ending more suitable to his tastes. For one week in September 1986, with CBS the target of potentially hostile new ownership, Rather tried ending his broadcasts with the word "courage", and was roundly ridiculed for it. For nearly two decades, Rather ended the show with: "That's part of our world tonight."

Rather also held other positions during his time as anchor. In January 1988, he became host of the newly created 48 Hours, and in January 1999, Rather joined the new 60 Minutes II as a correspondent.

Ratings for the Evening News with Rather at the helm fluctuated wildly, at a time when more alternatives to TV news were developing. After a dip to second place, Rather regained the top spot in 1985 until 1989, when he ceded the ratings peak to rival Peter Jennings at ABC's World News Tonight. By 1992, however, the Evening News had fallen to third place of the three major networks. It rose in rankings in 2005, when Bob Schieffer became the interim anchor between Rather and Katie Couric. It briefly moved ahead of ABC World News Tonight in the wake of the death of Peter Jennings, but remained behind NBC Nightly News. Rather was a frequent collaborator with CBS News producer Susan Zirinsky, a leading member of the news division's staff.

In 1987, new CBS owner Laurence Tisch oversaw layoffs of hundreds of CBS News employees, in a major shake-up of the network. Among those to go were correspondents such as David Andelman, Fred Graham, Morton Dean, and Ike Pappas. Fewer videotape crews were dispatched to cover stories, and numerous bureaus were closed. Critics cited the cutbacks as a major factor in CBS News' fall into third place in the ratings.

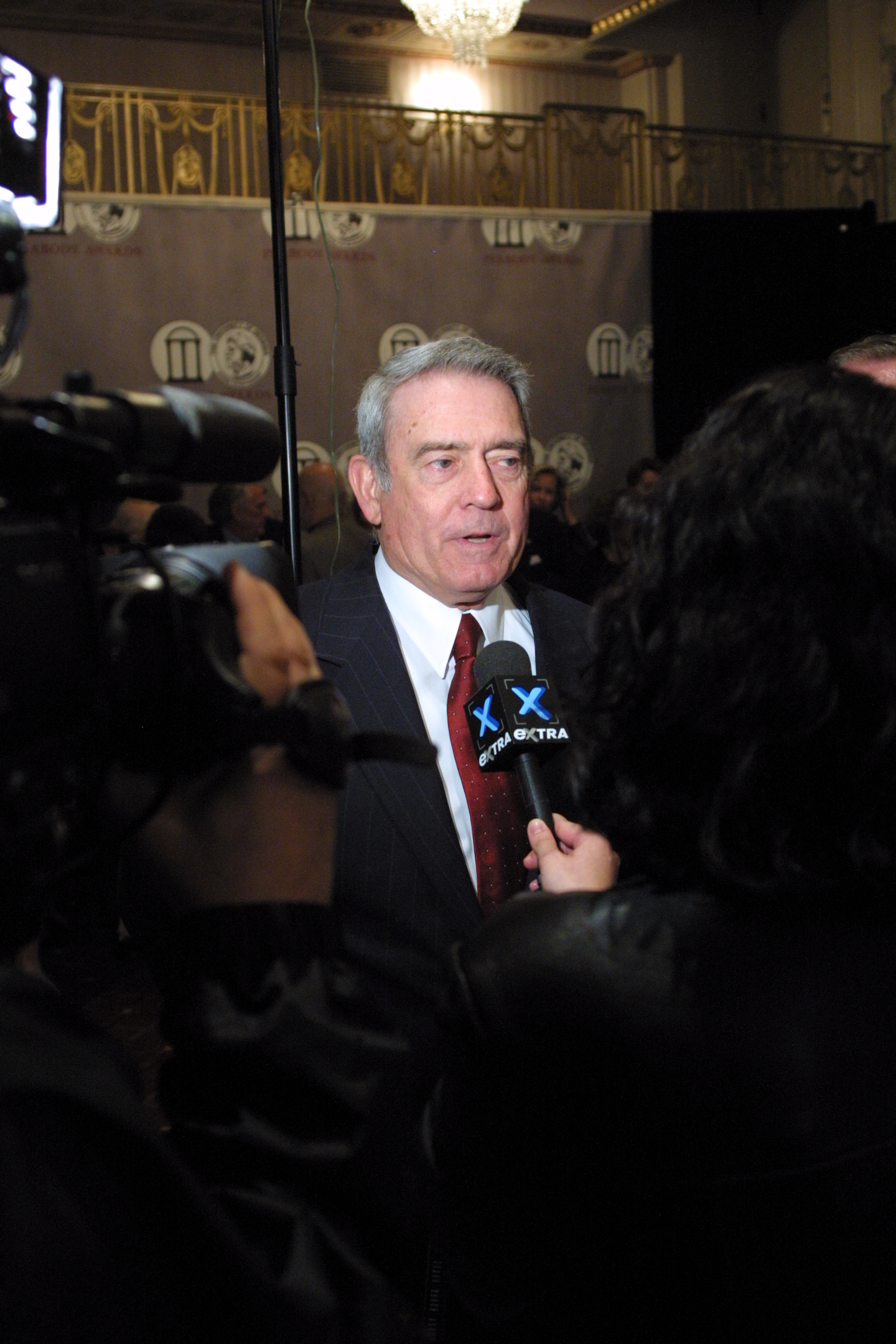
Rather during an interview with Extra at the 2002 Peabody Awards

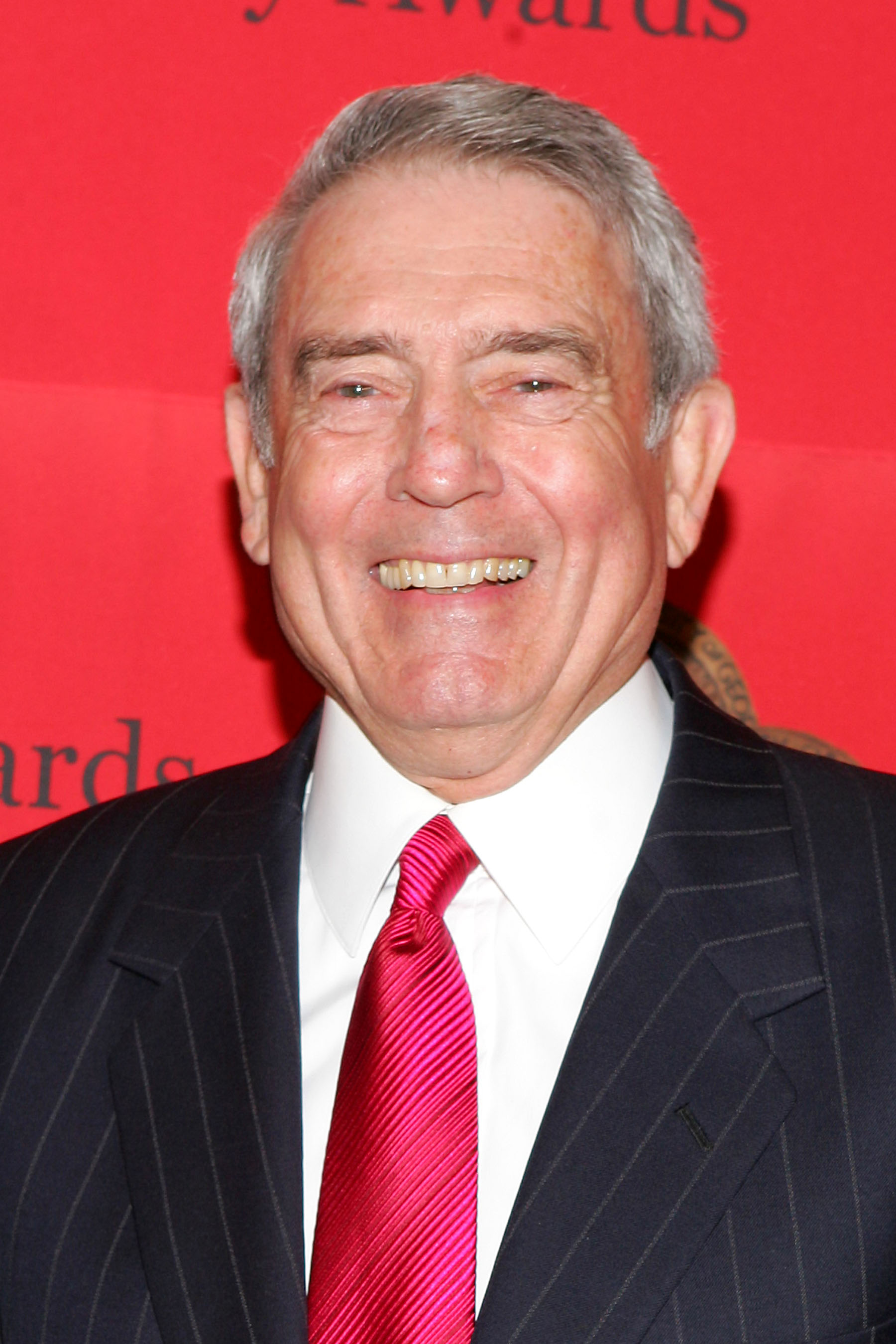
Rather at the 2005 Peabody Awards

For a short time from 1993 to 1995, Rather co-anchored the evening news with Connie Chung. Chung had been a Washington, D.C. correspondent for CBS News and anchored short news updates on the West Coast during her time as a newscaster for KNXT (now KCBS-TV) in Los Angeles. On joining the CBS Evening News, she reported "pop news" stories. In one widely cited case, she aggressively pursued Tonya Harding, who was accused of a plot to injure fellow Olympic ice skater Nancy Kerrigan. After Chung left the network, Rather went back to doing the newscast alone. By the 2005–06 season, the end of Rather's time as anchor, CBS Evening News lagged behind NBC Nightly News and ABC World News Tonight in the ratings. But it still drew approximately 5.5 million viewers a night. Criticism of Rather reached a fever pitch after 60 Minutes II ran his 2004 report about President Bush's military record. Numerous critics questioned the authenticity of the documents upon which the report was based. Rather subsequently admitted on the air that the documents' authenticity could not be proven. In the aftermath, CBS fired several members of CBS News staff but temporarily retained Rather, until his contract was up for renewal the following year, whereupon he was completely ousted.

== Journalistic history and influence ==
=== Nixon ===
During Richard Nixon's presidency, critics accused Rather of biased coverage against him. At a Houston news conference in March 1974, Nixon fielded a question from Rather, still CBS's White House correspondent, who said, "Thank you, Mr. President. Dan Rather, of CBS News." The room filled with jeers and applause, prompting Nixon to joke, "Are you running for something?" Rather replied, "No, sir, Mr. President. Are you?" He questioned whether Nixon was cooperating with the grand jury investigation and House Judiciary Committee in relation to the Watergate scandal.

NBC's Tom Brokaw has said the network considered hiring him to replace Rather as its White House correspondent, but dropped it after word was leaked to the press. Rather was believed to have provided tough coverage of the Watergate scandal, raising his profile.

=== Space Shuttle Challenger disaster ===
In January 1986, NASA faced repeated delays in the preparations to launch the Space Shuttles Columbia and Challenger in close sequence. Rather described the January 10 delay of Columbia as:

star-crossed space shuttle Columbia stood ready for launch again today, and once more, the launch was scrubbed. Heavy rain was the cause this time. The launch has been postponed so often since its original date, December 18, that it's now known as mission impossible.

This was considered an example of the "biting sarcasm" the media used related to NASA's scheduling. Columbia launched on January 12.

On January 27, Rather's reporting of the expected Challenger launch began as follows:

Yet another costly, red-faces-all-around space-shuttle-launch delay. This time, a bad bolt on a hatch and a bad-weather bolt from the blue are being blamed. What's more, a rescheduled launch for tomorrow doesn't look good either. Bruce Hall has the latest on today's high-tech low comedy.

— Dan Rather, January 27, 1986

On January 28, Challenger's explosion and destruction occurred 73 seconds after launch.

=== Afghanistan, Reagan, and George H. W. Bush ===
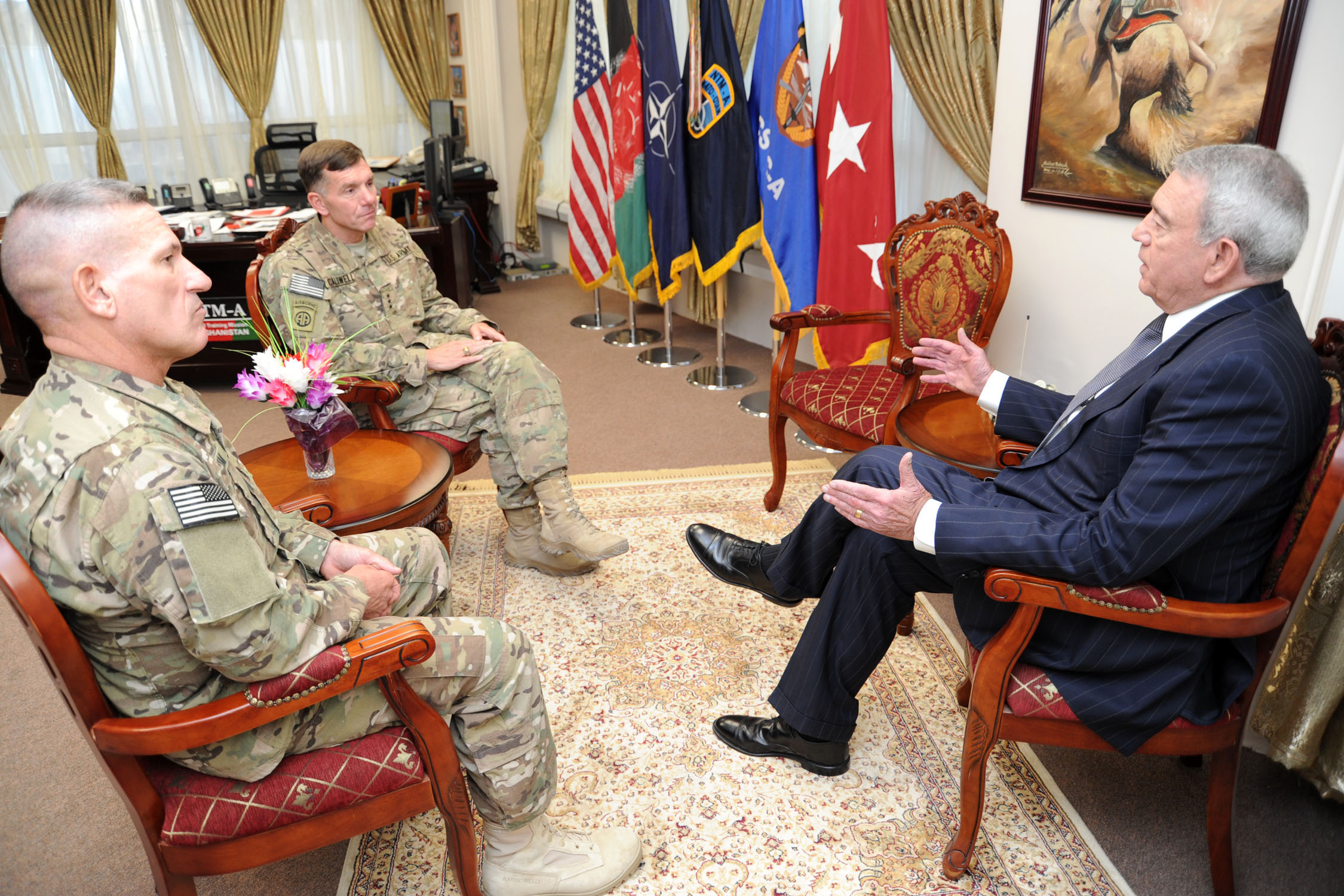
Rather speaking with Lt. Gen. William B. Caldwell IV and Sergeant Maj. Beam about the Afghan National Security Forces training mission and other issues at Camp Eggers in Kabul, Afghanistan, on July 26, 2011

During the Soviet–Afghan War, Rather was filmed reporting near the front lines while wearing a traditional mujahideen headdress and garments. Rather attracted an Evening News audience (and was nicknamed "Gunga Dan"). The American comic strip Doonesbury spoofed his actions.

Rather's reports were later revealed to have influenced Congressman Charlie Wilson (D-Texas), who led an effort to help the mujahideen which included the Taliban. The Soviets withdrew from Afghanistan in the late 1980s, shortly before the collapse of the USSR.

Rather was promoted to the anchor spot on the Evening News. He was competing with Roger Mudd, a more senior correspondent and a frequent substitute anchor for Walter Cronkite on Evening News. Mudd had also anchored the Sunday evening broadcast, but Rather traveled through Afghanistan when news led there. A few years into his service as anchor, Rather began wearing sweaters beneath his suit jacket to soften his on-air appearance for viewers.

During the 1980s, Rather gained further renown for his forceful and direct reporting of the Iran–Contra affair. He questioned Vice President George H. W. Bush in an on-air interview during the latter's presidential campaign. Bush referred to Rather's "dead air incident" saying:

I want to talk about why I want to be President, why those 41 percent of the people are supporting me. And I don't think it's fair to judge my whole career by a rehash on Iran. How would you like it if I judged your career by those seven minutes when you walked off the set in New York?

Shortly after Iraq invaded Kuwait, Rather secured an interview with Iraqi leader Saddam Hussein.

There is no powerful and quick strike that a people could deliver, whatever their overall power. The United States depends on the Air Force. The Air Force has never decided a war in the history of wars.

— Saddam Hussein in an interview with Dan Rather on August 29, 1990

On February 24, 2003, Rather conducted another interview with Hussein before the United States' 2003 invasion of Iraq. In the interview, Hussein invited Rather to be the moderator of a live television debate between himself and George W. Bush. The debate never took place.

=== The Wall Within ===
On June 2, 1988, Rather hosted a CBS News special, The Wall Within. In it, he interviewed six veterans, each of whom said he had witnessed horrible acts in Vietnam. Two of the men said that they had killed civilians, and two others said that they had seen friends die. Each talked about the effects the war had upon their lives—including depression, unemployment, drug use, and homelessness.

In 2004, National Review ran an article by Anne Morse entitled "The First Rathergate". She said that almost nothing claimed by participants in The Wall Within was true. Citing the self-published book Stolen Valor (1998) by veteran B. G. Burkett, and investigative journalist Glenna Whitley, Morse said that military records revealed that the six former servicemen had lied about their experiences. Only one served in combat, and two had never been in Vietnam.

=== Killian documents ===
On September 8, 2004, Rather reported on 60 Minutes Wednesday that a series of memos critical of President George W. Bush's Texas Air National Guard service record had been discovered in the personal files of Lt. Bush's former commanding officer, Lt. Col. Jerry B. Killian. Once copies of the documents were made available on the Internet, their authenticity was quickly called into question. Much of this was based on the fact that the documents were proportionally printed and displayed using other modern typographic conventions usually unavailable on military typewriters of the 1970s. The font used on the documents has characteristics that exactly or almost exactly match standard font features of Microsoft Word. This led to claims that the memos were forgeries. The accusations then spread over the following days into mainstream media outlets, including The Washington Post, The New York Times, and the Chicago Sun-Times.

Rather and CBS initially defended the story, stating that the documents had been authenticated by experts. CBS was contradicted by some of the experts it originally cited, and later reported that its source for the documents—former Texas Army National Guard officer Lt. Col. Bill Burkett—had misled the network about how he had obtained them.

On September 20, 2004, CBS retracted the story. Rather stated, "If I knew then what I know now, I would not have gone ahead with the story as it was aired, and I certainly would not have used the documents in question." The controversy has been referred to by some as "Memogate" and "Rathergate".

Following an investigation commissioned by CBS, CBS dismissed story producer Mary Mapes, and asked three other producers connected with the story to resign. Many believe Rather's retirement was hastened by this incident. On September 20, 2007, Rather was interviewed on Larry King Live commenting, "Nobody has proved that they were fraudulent, much less a forgery. ... The truth of this story stands up to this day."

=== Departure from the CBS Evening News ===
We've shared a lot in the 24 years we've been meeting here each evening, and before I say "Good night" this night, I need to say thank you. Thank you to the thousands of wonderful professionals at CBS News, past and present, with whom it's been my honor to work over these years. And a deeply felt thanks to all of you, who have let us into your homes night after night; it has been a privilege, and one never taken lightly.

Not long after I first came to the anchor chair, I briefly signed off using the word, "Courage". I want to return to it now, in a different way: to a nation still nursing a broken heart for what happened here in 2001, and especially to those who found themselves closest to the events of September 11; to our soldiers, sailors, airmen and marines, in dangerous places; to those who have endured the tsunami, and to all who have suffered natural disasters, and must now find the will to rebuild; to the oppressed and to those whose lot it is to struggle in financial hardship or in failing health; to my fellow journalists in places where reporting the truth means risking all; and to each of you, Courage.

For the CBS Evening News, Dan Rather reporting. Good night.

— Rather's speech at the end of his farewell newscast

Rather retired as the anchorman and Managing Editor of the CBS Evening News in 2005; his last broadcast was Wednesday, March 9, 2005. He had worked as the anchorman for 24 full years, the longest tenure of anyone in American television history, and for a short time, continued to work as a correspondent for 60 Minutes. Bob Schieffer, a fellow Texan and host of Face the Nation, took over Rather's position on an interim basis, with Katie Couric replacing Schieffer in 2006. Since retiring, Rather has spoken out about what he perceives as a lack of courage by American journalists. On January 24, 2006, Rather spoke to a Seattle audience. Before the speaking engagement, he told a newspaper reporter, "In many ways on many days, [reporters] have sort of adopted the attitude of 'go along, get along.'"

"What many of us need is a spine transplant," Rather added. "Whether it's City Hall, the State House, or the White House, part of our job is to speak truth to power."

=== Dismissal from CBS News ===
In June 2006, reports surfaced that CBS News would most likely not renew Rather's contract. According to a Washington Post article, sources from CBS said that executives at the network decided "there is no future role for Rather".

On June 20, 2006, CBS News and Sports President Sean McManus announced that Rather would leave the network after 44 years. Rather issued a separate statement which accompanied the news of the departure:

I leave CBS News with tremendous memories. But I leave now most of all with the desire to once again do regular, meaningful reporting. My departure before the term of my contract represents CBS's final acknowledgement, after a protracted struggle, that they had not lived up to their obligation to allow me to do substantive work there. As for their offers of a future with only an office but no assignments, it just isn't in me to sit around doing nothing. So I will do the work I love elsewhere, and I look forward to sharing details about that soon.

==== Lawsuit over ouster from CBS Network ====
On September 19, 2007, Rather filed a $70 million lawsuit in the New York Supreme Court before judge Ira Gammerman, against CBS, its former parent company Viacom; CBS President and CEO Leslie Moonves; Sumner Redstone, chairman of both Viacom and CBS; and Andrew Heyward, former president of CBS News. Rather accused the network and its ownership and management of making him a "scapegoat" in the Killian story. A CBS spokesman said that the lawsuit was "old news" and "without merit". On September 21, 2009, Rather's lawyers said that Bush's military service would be proven to be a sham, and Rather would be vindicated. On September 29, 2009, a New York state appeals court dismissed Rather's lawsuit against CBS.

On January 12, 2010, New York's top court refused to reinstate Rather's breach-of-contract lawsuit against CBS Corp. In his book titled Rather Outspoken, Rather said that the lawsuit "took a big whack out of my time, my psyche and my bank balance, but even so, it was worth it". On May 18, 2012, Rather appeared on Real Time With Bill Maher and said he had been fired for reporting a story about George W. Bush's year of absence from the reserve unit he served with, and that the news corporations had been "very uncomfortable" running the story.

== Post-CBS career ==
Following his departure from CBS, Rather joined Mark Cuban's cable network AXS TV (then called HDNet) to host and produce the weekly one-hour news show Dan Rather Reports from 2006 until 2013.

Since 2013, Rather has hosted and produced the hour-long series The Big Interview with Dan Rather on AXS TV, where he sits down for in-depth interviews with influential figures in music and entertainment, such as: Gregory Allman, Robert Plant, John Fogerty, Quentin Tarantino, Simon Cowell, Aaron Sorkin, and Sammy Hagar. He has also produced several documentary specials for the network under the banner Dan Rather Presents, including specials about "America's Mental Health Crisis", the United States Secret Service, and "The Shameful Side of International Adoption".

Rather also appears frequently on a number of news shows, including MSNBC's The Rachel Maddow Show and The Last Word with Lawrence O'Donnell and on CNN. He has also written for The Huffington Post and Mashable.

On May 28, 2007, Rather compared historical events to events in the Star Wars films in the History Channel special titled Star Wars: The Legacy Revealed.

In 2012, Rather published an autobiography titled Rather Outspoken: My Life in the News.

In 2015, Rather launched an independent production company called News and Guts Media, through which he produces The Big Interview among other projects.

In 2015, Rather also began actively posting on Facebook. He credits young staffers at News and Guts Media with pushing him to try social media. While his posts were considerably longer than typical social media posts, they resonated with the audience, which soon grew to more than two million followers. Even late night TV noticed Rather's unusual but effective Facebook presence. Subject matter has covered a range of topics, including: current political events, journalism, and childhood memories.

On September 23, 2016, SiriusXM Radio announced a new hour-long weekly program, Dan Rather's America, airing Tuesday mornings at 10 am Eastern on Radio Andy channel 102, debuting on September 27.

In the fall of 2017, the Briscoe Center for American History at the University of Texas completed a digital humanities project dedicated to the long career of the journalist that was titled Dan Rather: American Journalist. The culmination of three years of research conducted at the Briscoe Center, the site uses materials from a dozen archives and libraries, and draws from over 25 of the Briscoe Center for American History's news media and photojournalism collections. The website features over 2,000 digitized documents, 300 excerpts from twelve oral history interviews, and 1000 video clips, enabling visitors to dive deep into the history of the last 60 years through the lens of Dan Rather's career.

On January 21, 2018, it was announced that Rather would be launching a weekly 30-minute newscast on The Young Turks. Titled The News with Dan Rather, it aired on Mondays at 5:30 pm Eastern Time until that June.

In April 2024, Rather was interviewed by correspondent Lee Cowan on Sunday Morning, his first return to CBS News since his 2006 departure.

== Personal life ==
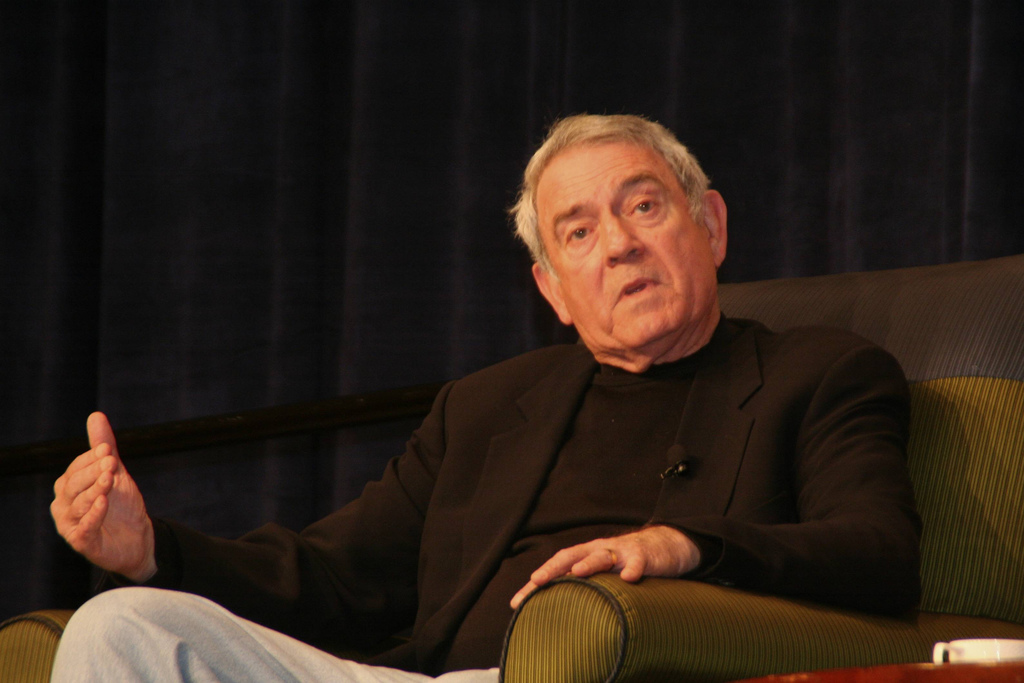
Rather at South by Southwest 2007; discussing media, the internet, and asking the "hard questions".

Rather was married to Jean Goebel for 67 years, from 1957 until her death in November 2024. They had a son and daughter, and maintained homes in New York City and Austin, Texas.

Sam Houston State University renamed its mass communications building after Rather in 1994. The building houses The Houstonian and KSHU, the student-run radio and television stations. In May 2007, Rather received an honorary Doctor of Humane Letters from Siena College in Loudonville, New York, for his lifetime contributions to journalism.

A columnist whose work is distributed by King Features Syndicate, Rather continues to speak out against political influence in journalism by corporations and governments. At a 2008 conference in Minneapolis, Minnesota, sponsored by the group Free Press, Rather criticized both local and national news organizations, stating that there is no longer incentive to do "good and valuable news".

== Books ==
- The Palace Guard, with Gary Paul Gates, 1974. ISBN 9780060135140.
- Rather, Dan; Herskowitz, Mickey (1977). The Camera Never Blinks: Adventures of a TV Journalist. Ballantine Books. ISBN 978-0-345-31833-6. OCLC 444864709.
- I Remember, with Peter Wyden, 1991. ISBN 978-0316734400.
- Rather, Dan; Herskowitz, Mickey (1995). The Camera Never Blinks Twice: The Further Adventures of a Television Journalist. William Morrow. ISBN 978-0688097486.
- Rather, Dan (1999). Deadlines and Datelines: Essays at the Turn of the Century. William Morrow & Co. ISBN 978-0-688-16566-6.
- The American Dream: Stories from the Heart of Our Nation, 2001. ISBN 978-0688178925.
- What Unites Us: Reflections on Patriotism, with Elliot Kirschner, 2017. ISBN 978-1616207823.
- What Unites Us: The Graphic Novel, with Elliot Kirschner, illustrated by Tim Foley, 2021. ISBN 9781250239945.

== Awards ==
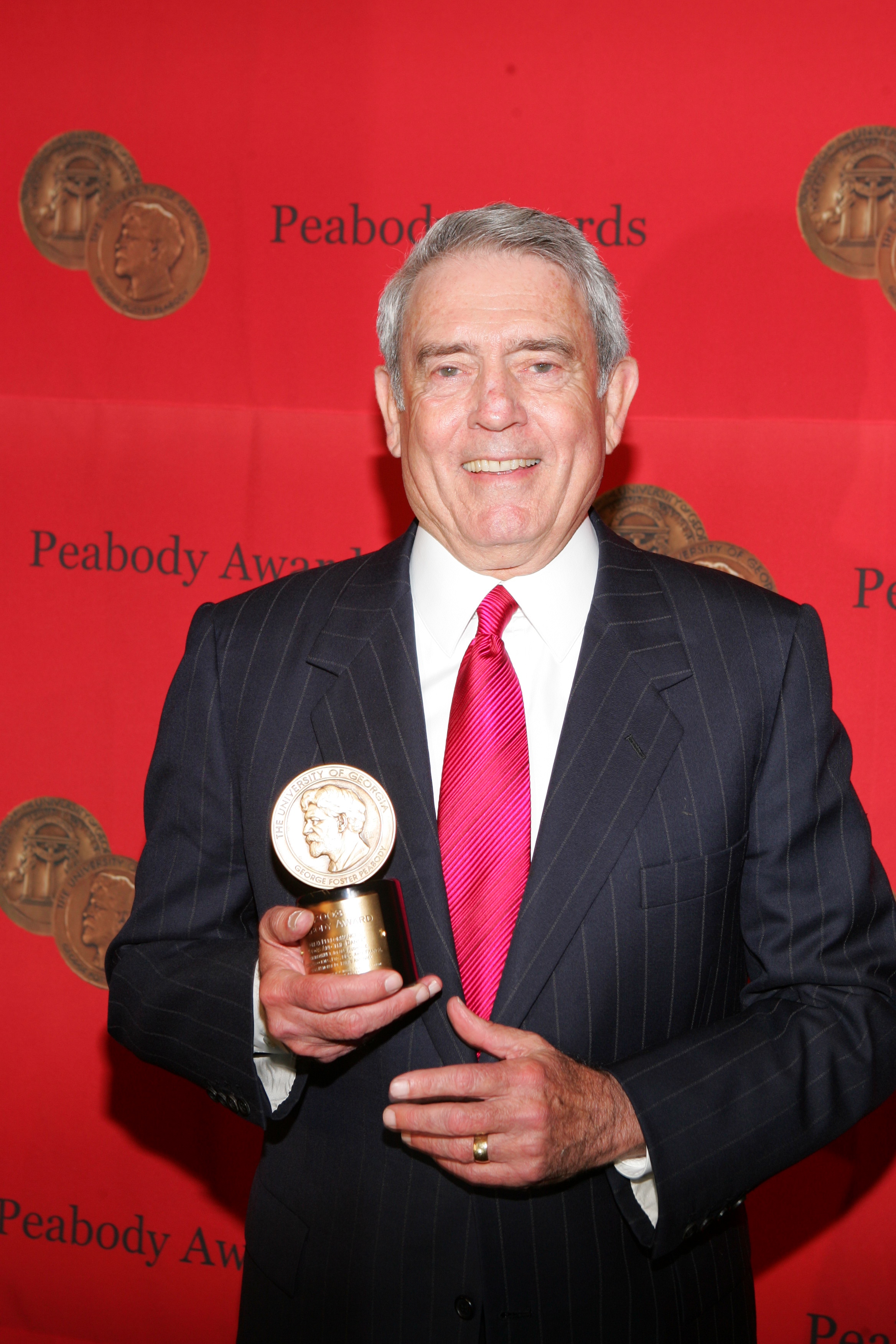
Rather at the 64th Annual Peabody Awards

Rather has received numerous Emmy Awards, several Peabody Awards, and various honorary degrees from universities.

Award	Year	Program Title
Peabody	1975	CBS News
Peabody	1976	60 Minutes
Peabody	1994	CBS Reports: D-Day
Peabody	1995	CBS Reports: In the Killing Fields of America
Paul White Award; Radio Television Digital News Association	1997	Lifetime Achievement
Peabody	2000	48 Hours: Heroes Under Fire
Peabody	2001	60 Minutes II: Memories of a Massacre
Peabody	2004	60 Minutes II: Abuse at Abu Ghraib
Emmy Trustees Award	2014	Lifetime Achievement
Peabody	2022	Career Achievement

In addition to these awards, Rather was inducted into the Television Hall of Fame in 2004. In 2001, he received the Golden Plate Award of the American Academy of Achievement.

In 2023, Rather was inducted into the SXSW Hall of Fame.

== Criticism ==
As one of the last broadcast news journalists from the era of the "Big Three" network news primacy, Rather was generally regarded highly within his profession by long-serving journalists; however, he has been accused of having a liberal bias.

=== Claims of bias ===
Rather's on-screen comments and election-night reporting have come under attack dating back to Richard Nixon's presidency. In a June 2002 interview with Larry King, his long-time co-worker (and self-described liberal), Andy Rooney stated that Rather is "transparently liberal".

During the weeks following the Killian documents stories, Rather received widespread criticism from other journalists and historians. In an interview with commentator Bill Maher, Rather accused Fox News Channel of receiving "talking points" from the Republican-controlled White House. Fox News commentator Bill O'Reilly, who had defended Rather during the Killian documents incident, criticized Rather for not offering any evidence to support the claim.

In 2002, Bernard Goldberg published a book with the title Bias, alleging a liberal bias in print and broadcast news organizations. In the book, Goldberg used Dan Rather as a primary example of a news anchorman with a liberal bias. He also criticized the anchor for his criticisms of President George W. Bush's and Vice President Dan Quayle's service in the National Guard, instead of the active duty military during the Vietnam War, and questioned Rather's own service.

Fairness and Accuracy in Reporting has accused Rather of having "an unwillingness to challenge official power and policy" in his reporting. Investigative reporter Mark Hertsgaard characterized Rather as a "stern anti-Communist" during the Reagan administration, for allegedly having "reported the pronouncements of public officials with considerable respect".

In April 2001, according to a front-page story in The Washington Post, Rather spoke at a Democratic party fundraiser in Austin, where he was the featured speaker. One of the official hosts for the fundraiser was Rather's daughter, Robin Rather; Rather said that he did not realize that his daughter was a host of the fundraiser. Rather also said that he did not realize that the event was a partisan fundraiser, although he did realize that after he arrived at the event.

=== From Walter Cronkite ===
During an appearance on CNN's American Morning in 2005, former CBS anchor Walter Cronkite said about Rather: "It surprised quite a few people at CBS and elsewhere that, without being able to pull up the ratings beyond third in a three-man field, that they tolerated his being there for so long." Cronkite also said that he would like to have seen Bob Schieffer in Rather's position sooner.

=== From Dallas CBS news director Eddie Barker ===
In the aftermath of the Kennedy assassination while Rather was a Dallas reporter, he interviewed a minister, who said some local schoolchildren had cheered upon learning of the President's shooting. The Associated Press later confirmed the story. A teacher at the school backed up the Rather story, confirming that some students at the school had cheered at the principal's news about Kennedy. Eddie Barker, local Dallas-area news director for CBS, said that the children were merely happy about being sent home early, and he also stated that they had not been given a reason for early school closure (Barker's children attended the school). Barker alleged that Rather had deliberately misrepresented the facts by indicating that the children were happy about the shooting. Barker attempted to fire Rather, but was overruled by the national CBS News management.

== Incidents ==
=== 1968 Democratic convention ===
During live coverage of the 1968 Democratic National Convention, Rather attempted to interview a delegate from Georgia who appeared as though he was being forcibly removed by men without identification badges.

As Rather approached the delegate to question the apparent strong-arm tactics of the Chicago political machine under Mayor Daley, he was punched in the stomach by one of the men, knocking him to the ground. "He lifted me right off the floor and put me away. I was down, the breath knocked out of me, as the whole group blew on by me ... In the CBS control room, they had switched the camera onto me just as I was slugged." Walter Cronkite, viewing the incident, added on-air, "I think we got a bunch of thugs here Dan!"

=== Chicago cab ride ===
On November 10, 1980, Rather landed at Chicago's O'Hare International Airport and got into a cab. He asked the cab driver to take him to the home of writer Studs Terkel, whom he was interviewing for 60 Minutes. A police spokesman said that the cab driver refused to go to the address and instead "wildly drove through the city streets," with Rather shouting out the window asking for help. The driver was charged with disorderly conduct. Rather called the incident "a rather minor thing". By the time the case was about to come to trial, he was about to add anchoring the CBS Evening News to his 60 Minutes role at CBS News. Rather declined to press charges, citing a "mounting schedule of reporting assignments".

=== Galloway lawsuit ===
In 1980, Rather and CBS were taken to court when Carl Galloway, a California doctor, claimed that a report on 60 Minutes wrongfully implicated him in an insurance fraud scheme. CBS stated Galloway had signed the bogus report and was suing Rather because he was upset at being caught. The jury sided with CBS and Rather, and they won the case. During the trial, Galloway's side used outtakes from the TV report showing that one interview was rehearsed.

=== "Courage" ===
For one week in September 1986, Rather signed off his broadcasts to CBS with the word "courage". He said that it was just a signature line, and had nothing to do with the news at the time. Other newscasters ridiculed and parodied Rather, and he dropped it.

=== "Kenneth, what is the frequency?" ===
On October 4, 1986, while walking along Park Avenue to his New York apartment, Rather was attacked and punched from behind by a man who demanded to know "Kenneth, what is the frequency?" while a second assailant chased and beat him. As the assailant pummeled and kicked Rather, he kept repeating the question. In describing the incident, Rather said "I got mugged. Who understands these things? I didn't and I don't now. I didn't make a lot of it at the time and I don't now. I wish I knew who did it and why, but I have no idea." Until the crime was solved years later, Rather's description of the bizarre crime led some to doubt the veracity of his account, although the doorman and building supervisor who came to Rather's aid fully confirmed his version of events.

The assault remained unsolved for some time, and the phrase "What's the frequency, Kenneth?" became a popular culture reference over the years, such as in a scene in the graphic novel Like a Velvet Glove Cast in Iron by Daniel Clowes. The opening track of the 1987 album Lolita Nation by California power pop group Game Theory is titled "Kenneth, What's the Frequency?" In 1994, the band R.E.M. released the song "What's the Frequency, Kenneth?" on their album Monster. Rather later sang with R.E.M. during a sound check prior to a concert at New York's Madison Square Garden, which was shown the following night on the Late Show with David Letterman.

In 1997, a TV critic writing in the New York Daily News solved the mystery, publishing a photo of the alleged assailant, William Tager, who received a 12.5-to-25-year prison sentence for killing NBC stagehand Campbell Montgomery outside The Today Show studio in 1994. Rather confirmed the story: "There's no doubt in my mind that this is the person." New York District Attorney Robert M. Morgenthau said "William Tager's identity as the man who attacked Mr. Rather was established in the course of an investigation by my office." Tager claimed he thought television networks were beaming signals into his brain. When he murdered the stagehand, Tager was trying to force his way into an NBC studio with a weapon, to find out the frequency the networks were using to attack him, so that he could block it. Tager was paroled in October 2010.

=== Dead air ===
On September 11, 1987, Pope John Paul II was in Miami, beginning a rare U.S. tour. Rather was scheduled to anchor Evening News remotely. A U.S. Open tennis match broadcast ran long, extending into the timeslot for the Evening News. Rather walked off the set in anger just before he was to anchor the newscast. He was upset and informed CBS Sports that it should fill the half-hour if the Evening News did not begin on time. The Steffi Graf–Lori McNeil tennis coverage ended sooner than expected at 6:32 pm, but Rather had disappeared by then and could not be located. (CBS Sports agreed to break away immediately after the match without commentary.) More than 100 CBS affiliate stations were forced to broadcast six minutes of dead air. Some stations aired local newscasts in its place, while some others aired syndicated programming such as reruns of game shows or sitcoms, and others displaying stills of station identification cards or graphics explaining that they were experiencing technical difficulties.

Phil Jones, the chairman of the CBS affiliation board and general manager of Kansas City's KCTV, demanded an apology from Rather. Miami CBS affiliate WTVJ dropped the newscast episode entirely and aired a syndicated rerun of a game show instead, while Baltimore's WBAL-TV aired their newscast in its place instead of Rather's. The next day, Rather apologized for abandoning the anchor desk.

The following year, when Rather asked Vice President George H. W. Bush about his role in the Iran–Contra affair during a live interview, Bush responded, "Dan, how would you like it if I judged your entire career by those seven minutes when you walked off the set in New York?" Bush's media consultant Roger Ailes had a mole at CBS who alerted him that Rather's goal was to "take Bush out of the race" with a tough interview about Iran–Contra. Roger Ailes alerted Bush during the cab ride to the studio and suggested the reply. Bush was running for president in 1988, and his polling favorability benefited in Iowa and New Hampshire after the interview aired.

== "Ratherisms" ==
Rather is known for his many colorful analogies and descriptions during live broadcasts. Similar to those used by baseball announcer Red Barber, cycling commentator Phil Liggett, and Formula 1 commentator Murray Walker, these "Ratherisms" are also called "Texanisms" or "Danisms" by some. A few of the more colorful ones, several of which were used throughout the 2008 HBO made-for-TV movie Recount about the 2000 Election, include:

- "This race is shakier than cafeteria Jell-O."
- "This thing is as tight as the rusted lugnuts on a '55 Ford."
- His characterization of the Republican Party's assessment of President Obama: "[He] couldn't sell watermelons if you gave him the state troopers to flag down the traffic."

== In popular culture ==
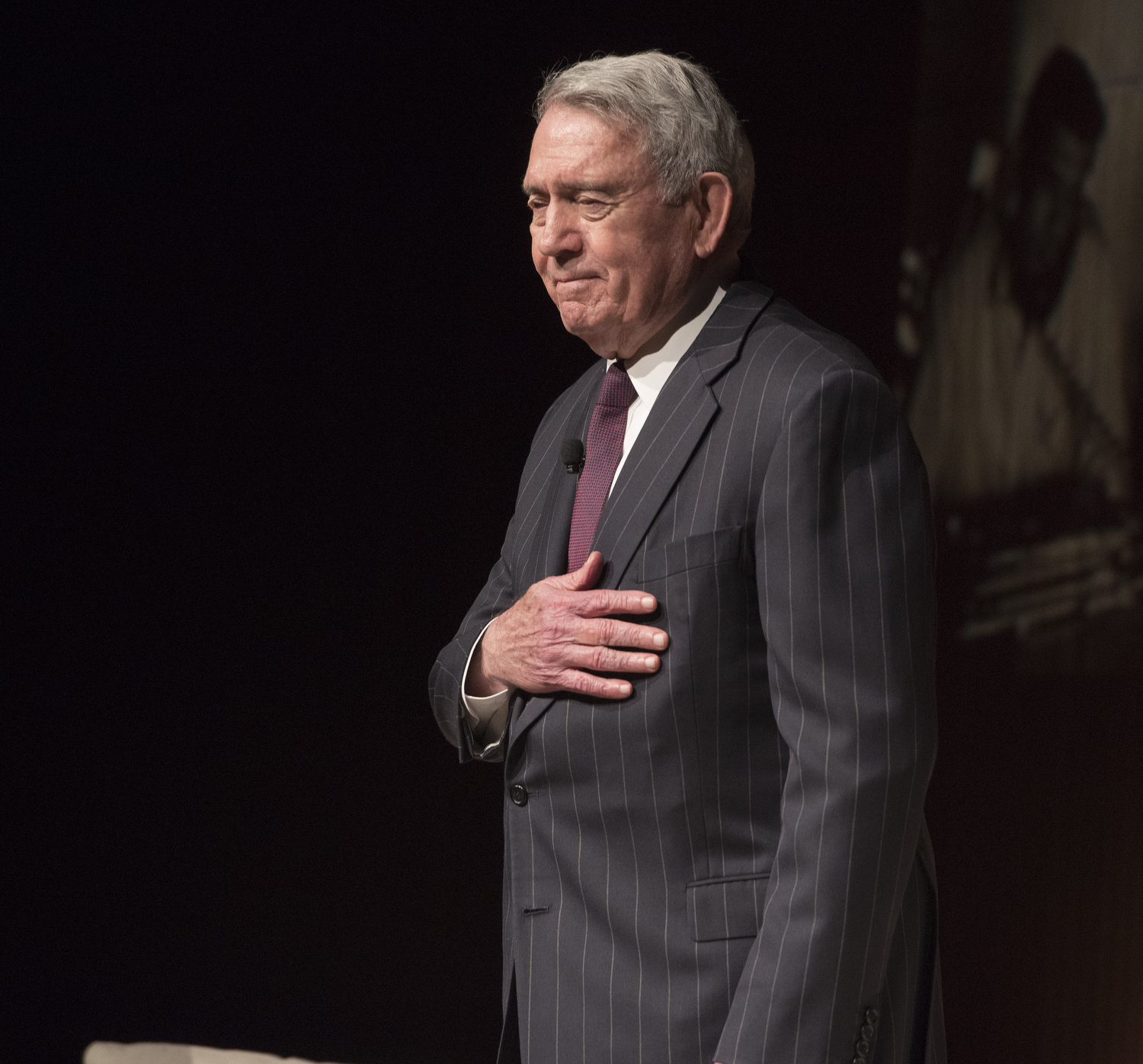
Rather at the LBJ Presidential Library in 2016

Rather has been referenced in the television shows Saturday Night Live and Family Guy and many films. An animated caricature of him made a cameo appearance in the JibJab political cartoon, Good to Be in D.C. In 1971, he had a cameo in an episode of the number one hit comedy series All in the Family. Entitled The Man in the Street, series star Carroll O'Connor's Archie Bunker character excitedly awaits the viewing of a videotaped interview he gave earlier that day for the CBS Evening News. At the last minute, to his dismay, the segment is preempted by the telecast of a Richard Nixon presidential address from the Oval Office. Rather appears, as himself, delivering post-speech analysis from actual news footage. Jean Stapleton, as Archie's scatterbrained wife Edith Bunker, says of Rather how he's there to "... tell us what Mr. Nixon just said."

In 2004, he was featured in the documentary film Barbecue: A Texas Love Story by Austin-based director Chris Elley. Two years later, Rather and Elley educated a group of New Yorkers in Madison Square Park about the true meaning of BBQ, and its significance to the identity of the Lone Star State.

In the 2006–07 graphic novel Shooting War, which is set in the year 2011, an 80-year-old Dan Rather is shown to be one of the last journalists still reporting from Iraq. He had a cameo in the premiere of the Fall 2007 drama Dirty Sexy Money on ABC television. He guest-starred as himself in The Simpsons episode, "E Pluribus Wiggum".

Rather appeared on The Daily Show in May 2009, wearing an Afro wig and mutton-chop sideburns to narrate a segment about the late former President Nixon eating a burrito, as a parody of MSNBC's extensive coverage of President Obama and Vice President Biden's hamburger lunch. He appears in the 2008 award-winning documentary Boogie Man: The Lee Atwater Story.

A skit on the 38th season of Sesame Street featured Anderson Cooper interviewing two grouches, "Walter Cranky" and "Dan Rather Not", who, when asked to answer questions, demurred with the phrase "I'd rather not."

Robert Redford portrayed Rather in the 2015 film Truth. Rather appeared in the documentary series Facing in the episode "Facing Saddam", providing his views on Saddam Hussein.

The 1998 mashup song "Rocked by Rape" by the Evolution Control Committee parodied TV news by selecting hundreds of phrases uttered by Rather on the air, focusing on bad, evil, terrible things. CBS sent them a "cease-and-desist" letter in 2000, claiming copyright violation, but after fair use responses from the Committee and others, desisted. The recording was played at a Rather roast and on C-SPAN.

In 2024, Netflix aired the documentary film Rather, directed by Frank Marshall, a biography of Rather.

== Ratings ==
Under Rather's predecessor, Walter Cronkite, the CBS Evening News was a strong No. 1 in the ratings, which Rather maintained through much of the 1980s. However, Tom Brokaw and his NBC Nightly News, and Peter Jennings of ABC News' World News Tonight, increasing in popularity, eventually cut deep into the Rather broadcast's numbers.

== See also ==
- New Yorkers in journalism

Media offices
Preceded by Walter Cronkite	CBS Evening News anchor March 9, 1981 – March 9, 2005 co-anchor with Connie Chung (1993–1995)	Succeeded by Bob Schieffer
