= Visual analogue scale =

Psychometric response scale

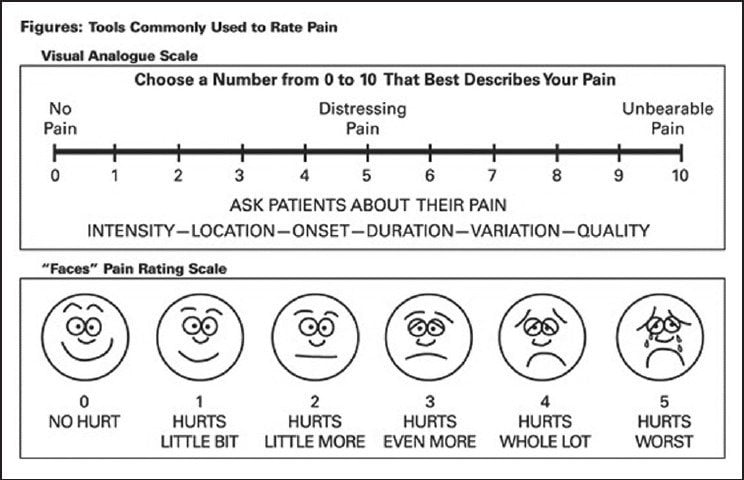
A visual scale used to assess pain intensity in children using numbers and graduated facial expressions

The visual analogue scale (VAS) is a psychometric response scale that can be used in questionnaires. It is a measurement instrument for subjective characteristics or attitudes that cannot be directly measured. When responding to a VAS item, respondents specify their level of agreement to a statement by indicating a position along a continuous line between two end points.

== Comparison to other scales ==
This continuous (or "analogue") aspect of the scale differentiates it from discrete scales such as the Likert scale. There is evidence showing that visual analogue scales have superior metrical characteristics than discrete scales, thus a wider range of statistical methods can be applied to the measurements.

The VAS can be compared to other linear scales such as the Likert scale or Borg scale. The sensitivity and reproducibility of the results are broadly very similar, although the VAS may outperform the other scales in some cases. These advantages extend to measurement instruments made up from combinations of visual analogue scales, such as semantic differentials.

== Uses ==
Recent advances in methodologies for Internet-based research include the development and evaluation of visual analogue scales for use in Internet-based questionnaires.

VAS is the most common pain scale for quantification of endometriosis-related pain and skin graft donor site-related pain. A review came to the conclusion that VAS and numerical rating scale (NRS) were the best adapted pain scales for pain measurement in endometriosis. For research purposes, and for more detailed pain measurement in clinical practice, the review suggested use of VAS or NRS for each type of typical pain related to endometriosis (dysmenorrhea, deep dyspareunia and non-menstrual chronic pelvic pain), combined with the clinical global impression (CGI) and a quality of life scale. VAS is being increasingly used for the assessment of loudness and annoyance of acute and chronic tinnitus.

The usage of a visual analogue scale (VAS) measuring fear of birth (FOB) was first initiated by Rouhe et al. FOBS is used to identify pregnant women with a fear of birth (FOB). It is a visual analogue scale (like VAS) that cover two constructs: worry and fear. The pregnant women are asked to rate their feelings about the approaching birth by responding to the question “How do you feel right now about the approaching birth?” on a paper with two 100 mm VAS-scale printed on it. They indicate their feeling and respond by placing a mark on the lines with the anchor words “calm/worried” and “no fear/strong fear”. The two values on the VAS-scales are added up to give a total score ranging from 0 to 100. Higher scores indicate higher levels of fear, and the cut-off point for fear of birth is 60. Later on, FOBS, was then developed and tested based on Rouhe’s research in pregnant women in both Sweden and Australia. There have also been studies on pregnant women's thoughts when assessing fear of birth on the Fear of Birth Scale.
