= Fluorophore-assisted carbohydrate electrophoresis =

Fluorophore assisted carbohydrate electrophoresis or FACE is a biochemical technology suited for detecting complex mixtures of high molecular weight N-glycans. A specialized form of this technique is the DSA-FACE, which is an acronym for DNA sequencer-assisted flurophore-assisted carbohydrate electrophoresis. DSA-FACE has higher resolution and sensitivity than classical FACE.
