= FACE risk profile =

- Purpose: mental health assessment

The FACE risk profile is a commercial mental health assessment tool produced by Imosphere.

== Nomenclature ==
FACE stands for "Functional Analysis of Care Environments".

Imosphere produces several toolkits to assess risk and needs in health and social care, mental health, learning disabilities, young people, and substance misuse problems; to assess people's mental capacity; and to assess needs for telecare.

The FACE risk profile is part of the toolkit for calculating risks for people with mental health problems, learning disabilities, substance misuse problems, both young and older people, as well as those in perinatal services.
