= Face (a cappella group) =

American a cappella group

- Origin: Boulder, Colorado, USA
- Genre: A cappella
- Years active: 2002–present
- Label: Independent
- Members: Forest Kelly; Anderson Daniel; Mark Megibow; Stephen Ross; Ryan Driver
- Past members: Joseph DiMasi; Jayson Throckmorton; Ben Lunstad; Cody Qualls
- Website: www.facevocalband.com

Face is an American a cappella group from Boulder, Colorado. Formed by Joseph DiMasi and Ben Lunstad in 2002, they made their first national appearances as one of the eight original groups on NBC's premiere season of The Sing-Off in 2009. They are a two-time National Audience Favorite and two-time runner-up at the National Finals of Harmony Sweepstakes A Cappella Festival (2005 and 2007), and the runner-up for Favorite Pop/Rock Group at the Contemporary A Cappella Society's Community Awards (2007). Face has also garnered numerous local awards including Best Local Band by The Denver Channel's A-List Awards (2013), Best Local Musician by Boulder Weekly's Best of Boulder Awards (2009) and third-place for Best Local Band by The Denver Channel's A-List Awards (2009).

== History ==
The idea for Face grew out of a university a cappella experience. Both Ben Lunstad and Joseph DiMasi had formed and performed with undergraduate a cappella groups. They met in grad school in 2000 at the University of Colorado in Boulder while singing with CU's In The Buff. Deciding that In The Buff wasn't exactly what they were looking for, Ben and DiMasi co-founded the award-winning Extreme Measures.

The success of Extreme Measures attracted bass J Forest Kelly, and the core of Face began to form. Once they graduated, they began seeking members to fill out Face. It would be two years before the group was fully formed. Many of the group members were found by friends of friends. Mark Megibow had been performing since he was 6 years old but was in the midst of a 7-year hiatus until he got the call from DiMasi asking him to audition. During this time, the group included John Lawrence, Michael Daehnick, and Cody Qualls.

In 2003, Ryan Driver was introduced to the group. He added his voice and successful arrangements to the group as well as his longtime friend, Steven Ross. 2004 was a big year for Face. Ryan Driver, called Driver by his friends and fans, took a year to tour with the East Coast's Almost Recess and later that year, Joseph left the group for other endeavors. In addition, Jayson Throckmorton was introduced to the group by more friends of friends and has impressed his fans with his tenor.

By 2005, the group had gelled. They saw success in the Harmony Sweepstakes A Cappella Festival as well as other competitions. In the years to come, they competed in Colorado and California, performed for Jimmy Buffett and numerous politicians at the Bohemian Grove, provided on-stage vocal accompaniment for Ballet Nouveau Colorado's contemporary ballet production face.2.face, performed in Las Vegas, and are currently performing 80–90 times a year.

Between 2006 and 2011 Face continued to rock the local and national stage. They were featured on two national television programs, The Sing-Off and America's Got Talent and touched crowds from San Francisco to Chicago, from Dallas to Detroit and Minneapolis. In late 2011 Face released their fourth album, I Hear the Bells at their 10-year anniversary concert held at the Paramount Theatre in Denver.

2012 was a tumultuous year for Face with many periodic changes in the band's performing line up. Stephen Ross suffered a vocal injury and was out for August and September, while Jayson Throckmorton made an official exit from the group in early June. Former member Cody Qualls, who had exited previously in 2007, stepped in for Jayson's absence. By September of that same year, Face announced that Qualls would be returning as a permanent member of Face.

In December 2013, an ice storm in Dallas/Fort Worth canceled numerous flights, including Face's who had been in Texas for a performance. They entertained other delayed passengers by walking through the concourse singing Christmas carols. Their sound man, Jeremy, taped them singing, and uploaded it to YouTube. As a result, Face was featured on Headline News, the Huffington Post and ABC World News with Diane Sawyer.

As of 2014, Face has released five CDs and one live concert Blu-ray/DVD.

In January 2016, co-founder Ben Lunstad did one last farewell show, and officially left Face. As of now, Face is not looking for a sixth member and will be continuing to perform with their five remaining members.

== America's Got Talent ==
In 2008, Face auditioned for America's Got Talent, getting before the celebrity judges, including David Hasselhoff; however, they were eliminated and their segment never aired.

== The Sing-Off ==
Face are featured on the NBC television program The Sing-Off, which premiered on December 14, 2009. Face was selected amongst hundreds of groups to compete. Having made it that far, Face performed "Livin' on a Prayer" by Bon Jovi and while the judges were impressed that they could "rock without instruments," it was not enough to keep them on the show. In particular, their lack of an upper range ultimately led to their elimination in the first round.

Face performed a rendition of Living on a Prayer by Bon Jovi. Commenting on their loss to an a capella group from Lee University, a writer from the The New York Times stated "How could these guys get the heave-ho, especially given that a whole other religious college ... is also represented in the final eight and that they had such a swell back story? One of the member’s wives couldn’t go through a pregnancy because of cancer, so the wife of another member carried the embryo for her."

=== Performances and results ===
Episode/theme	Song choice	Original artist	Result
Premiere	"Livin' on a Prayer"	Bon Jovi	Eliminated

== Members ==
All of the men in Face are employed with full-time jobs and most have families.

- Cody Qualls – Cody is a vocal coach, songwriter, nationally recognized master of ceremonies and the director of the Whole Body Singing Studio. He is married with two sons and a daughter.
- J Forest Kelly – Forest is a massage therapist in Boulder, Colorado. He is married with one son.
- Mark Megibow – Mark works with Jewish teens and does leadership seminars. He is married with one son.
- Stephen Ross – Stephen is a music teacher at Skyline High School in Longmont, Colorado, U.S.A. He is married with one daughter.
- Ryan Driver – Driver is an entrepreneur and owns his own ice cream shop. He is also apprenticing as a recording engineer at Sonic Audio Productions in Denver.

== Awards and accolades ==
Best Local Band/Musician

- A Cappella Music Awards Quintet of the Year 2019
- A Cappella Music Awards Male Vocalist of the Year 2019 (Cody Qualls)
- A Cappella Music Awards Beatboxer/Vocal Percussionist of the Year 2019 (Mark Megibow)
- Boulder Weekly's "Best of Boulder" Reader Survey 2015
- Yellow Scene Magazine's "Best of the West" 2015
- Boulder Weekly's "Best of Boulder" Reader Survey 2014
- The Denver Channel's A-List Awards 2013
- Boulder Weekly's "Best of Boulder" Reader Survey 2009

Best Band That Plays the 'Burbs

- Yellow Scene's "Best of the West" 2008–2009

Audience Favorite

- Harmony Sweepstakes National Finals 2007
- Harmony Sweepstakes Rocky Mountain Regional 2007
- Harmony Sweepstakes National Finals 2005
- Harmony Sweepstakes Rocky Mountain Regional 2005
- Harmony Sweepstakes Rocky Mountain Regional 2004
- Harmony Sweepstakes Rocky Mountain Regional 2003

National Runner-Up

- Harmony Sweepstakes National Finals 2007
- Harmony Sweepstakes National Finals 2005

Best Arrangement

- Ben Lunstad, "O Fortuna" – Harmony Sweepstakes National Finals 2007
- Ryan Driver, "Home" – Harmony Sweepstakes Rocky Mountain Regional 2007
- Ryan Driver, "Harder To Breathe" – Harmony Sweepstakes Rocky Mountain Regional 2005

Favorite Rock/Pop Group Runner-Up

- Contemporary A Cappella Society Community Awards 2007

Regional Champions

- Harmony Sweepstakes Rocky Mountain Regional 2005, 2007

Best Stage Presentation

- Harmony Sweepstakes Rocky Mountain Regional 2007

Best Soloist

- Ryan Driver – Harmony Sweepstakes Rocky Mountain Regional 2007

Regional Runner-Up

- Harmony Sweepstakes Rocky Mountain Regional 2003

== Discography ==
- Wake Up (2004)
- Forward (2006)
- Momentum (2009)
- I Hear the Bells (2011)
- How Was the Show (2013)
- This Is the Season (2014) – live concert Blu-ray/DVD
- Connections (2015) – recorded live during a European concert tour
- Big Time (2017) – broke the record for most CDs sold during a concert at Red Rocks Amphitheater
