= Facing (TV series) =

- Genre: History
- Original language: English
- No. of seasons: 1
- No. of episodes: 5

Production
- Executive producers: Derik Murray; Paul Gertz; Roderick Bellamy
- Running time: 44-53 minutes
- Production company: Network Entertainment

Original release
- Network: National Graphic
- Release: August 30 – September 27, 2016

Facing is a documentary series that portrays the lives of some of the most influential figures in history. The episodes combine archived photos and video footage with first person interviews from individuals who have known or "faced" these personalities; no single narrator for the series or any dramatization is involved. Produced by Network Entertainment, it is a five part series telecast on the National Geographic Channel. The series was nominated for the 2017 RealScreen Awards and Leo Awards. In the RealScreen Awards, it won the history/biographical category in a non-fiction series. The program earned several accolades at the Leo Awards including the best documentary program, best direction and best editing.

== Episodes ==
No.	Title	Original release date
1	"Facing Escobar"	August 30, 2016
Compilation of interviews to Steve Murphy, Javier Peña, Joe Toft, George Jung, John Jairo “Popeye” Velásquez, and Miguel Alfredo "Maza" Márquez
2	"Facing Saddam"	September 6, 2016
Compilation of interviews to Dan Rather, Mowaffak al-Rubaie, Zainab Salbi, and Charles Horner.
3	"Facing Suge Knight"	September 13, 2016
Compilation of interviews to Vanilla Ice, Virgil Roberts, Gary Ballen, Greg Kading, Sharitha Golden, Tracy Lynn Curry and Danny Boy.
4	"Facing Putin"	September 20, 2016
Compilation of interviews to Robert Gates, Marina Litvinenko, Platon Antoniou, Leon Panetta, Bill Browder, Viktor Yushchenko, and Nadya Tolokonnikova.
5	"Facing Schwarzenegger"	September 27, 2016
Interviews by Lou Ferrigno, Rae Dawn Chong, Carl Weathers, Ivan Reitman, Peter Kent, Ric Drasin, and Tom McClintock.
6	"Facing Trump"	2016
Compilation of interviews to Gloria Allred, Ann Coulter, Omarosa Manigault, Timothy L. O'Brien, Al Sharpton, and Michael Tollin.
7	"Facing Hillary"	Unaired

== See also ==
- Facing Ali
