= Face Down =

Face Down may refer to:

== Music ==
- Face Down (band), a Swedish post-thrash/death metal band
- Facedown Records, a Christian record label based in California

=== Albums ===
- Face Down (album), a 1999 album by Serial Joe
- Facedown (album), a 2004 album by Matt Redman
- Facedown (EP), a 2012 extended play by The 1975

=== Songs ===
- "Face Down", a 1980 song by Wild Horses
- "Face Down" (The Red Jumpsuit Apparatus song), 2006
- "Face Down" (Arashi song), 2012
- "Face Down", a song by American rapper Meek Mill
- "Face Down", a song by Killer Be Killed from Killer Be Killed
- "Face Down", a song by Prince from Emancipation

== Others ==
- Face Down (film), a 2015 film
