= Faces (festival) =

Annual music festival in Raseborg, Finland

Coordinates: 60.1300°N 23.5444°E

Faces is a music festival celebrating multiculturalism, world music and multiplicity held annually in Raseborg, Southern Finland in July–August ever since 1998 organized by the nonprofit Etnokult Association which was formed for this express purpose in December 1997 by Börje Mattsson and Holger Wickström.

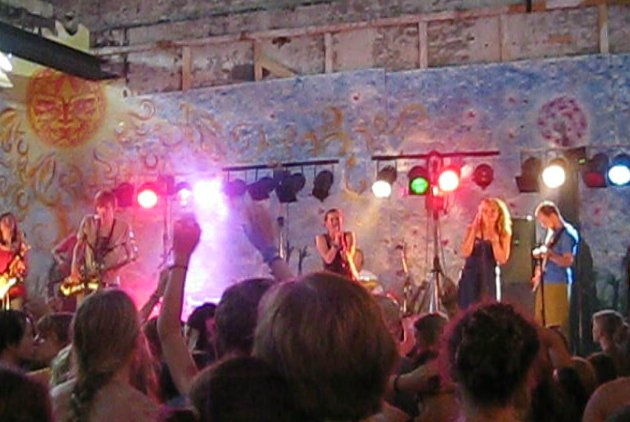
Maria Gasolina performing in 2008 Faces

== Location ==
- In 1998 the festival was held at the Raseborg Castle ruins
- In 1999-2009 the festival was held in the setting of Billnäs ironworks grounds, Pohja county.
- In 2010-2013 the festival was held by the seaside in Gumnäs, Raseborg.
- In 2014-2015 it returned to its original site, the Raseborg Castle ruins.
- In 2016 the festival was held in Fiskars Village, Raseborg on the first weekend of August. 2016 also marks the Festival returning to its 3-day format.
- In 2017 the 20th Faces festival will be held on the first week-end of August in Fiskars.

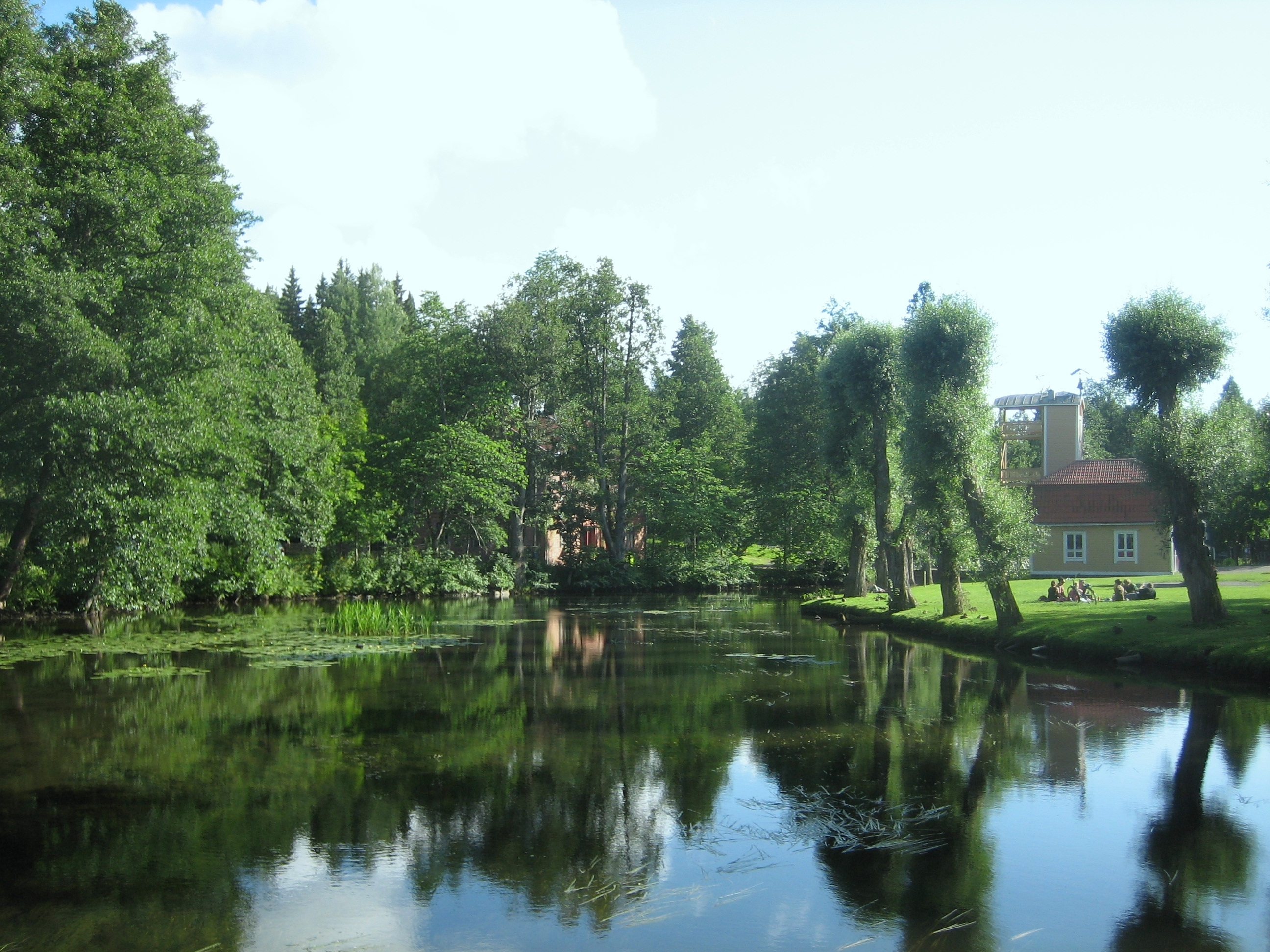
View from Fiskars Village, the 2016 and 2017 site of the festival

== Program ==
Faces program includes a wide variety of world music from home and abroad but is not limited to music. Other annual happenings in the Faces are the Finnish Street Performance Championships, the Small Faces program for children, free stage for impromptu participation and art installations throughout the festival area. Performing arts and workshops have along the years included e.g. live action painting, spiral yoga, wellness awareness, instrument building and conscientiousness participatory workshops. Faces Etnofestival has always gone the extra mile to provide for accessibility and is also known as one of the most family-friendly festivals in Finland.

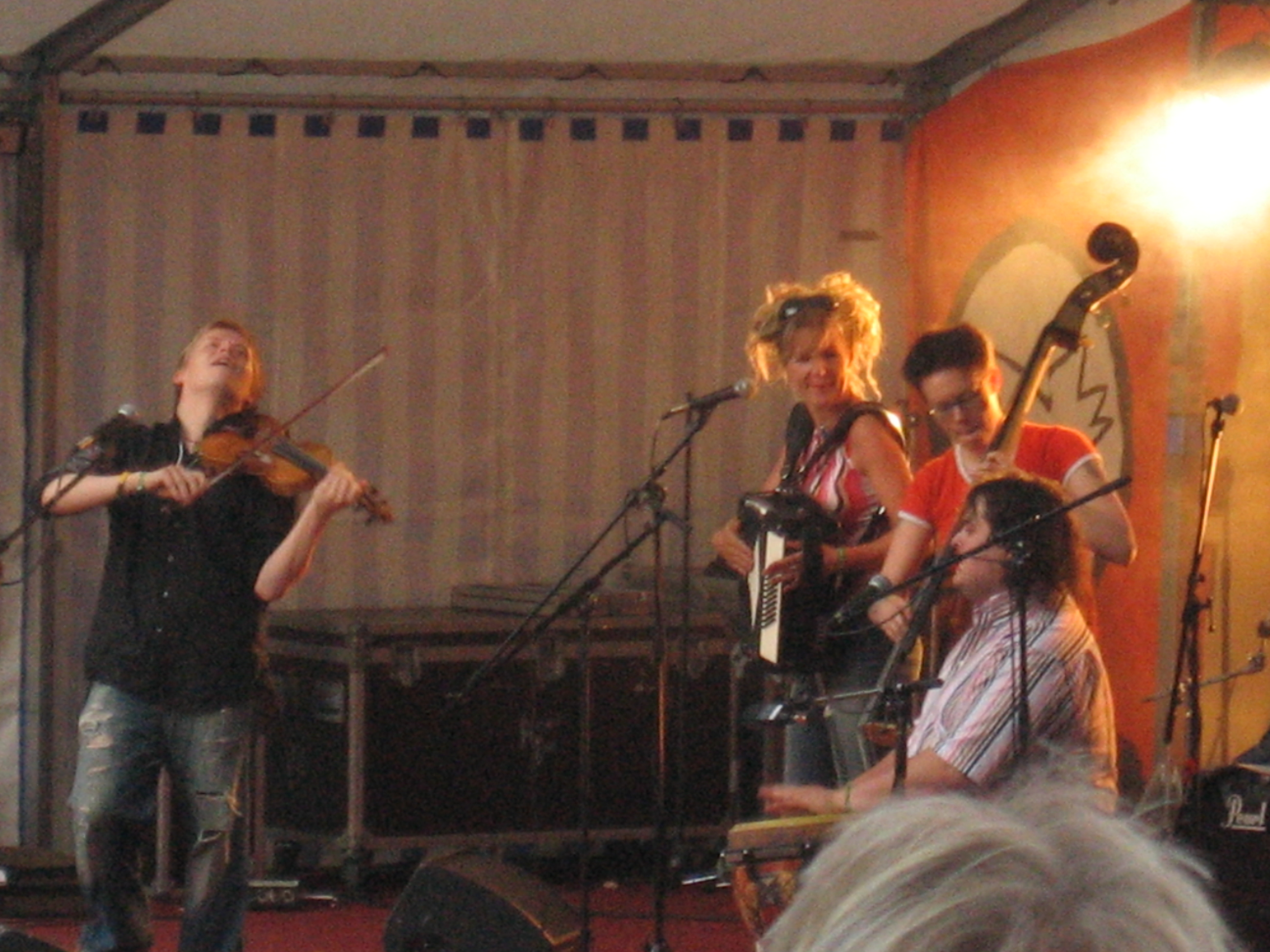
Pekka Kuusisto and the Luomuplayers performing in the Faces etnomusic festival in summer 2005.

== Spin-offs ==
Spin-off festivals have been arranged in Petroskoi, Karelia since 2003 and in Bosnia and Herzegovina since 2006.

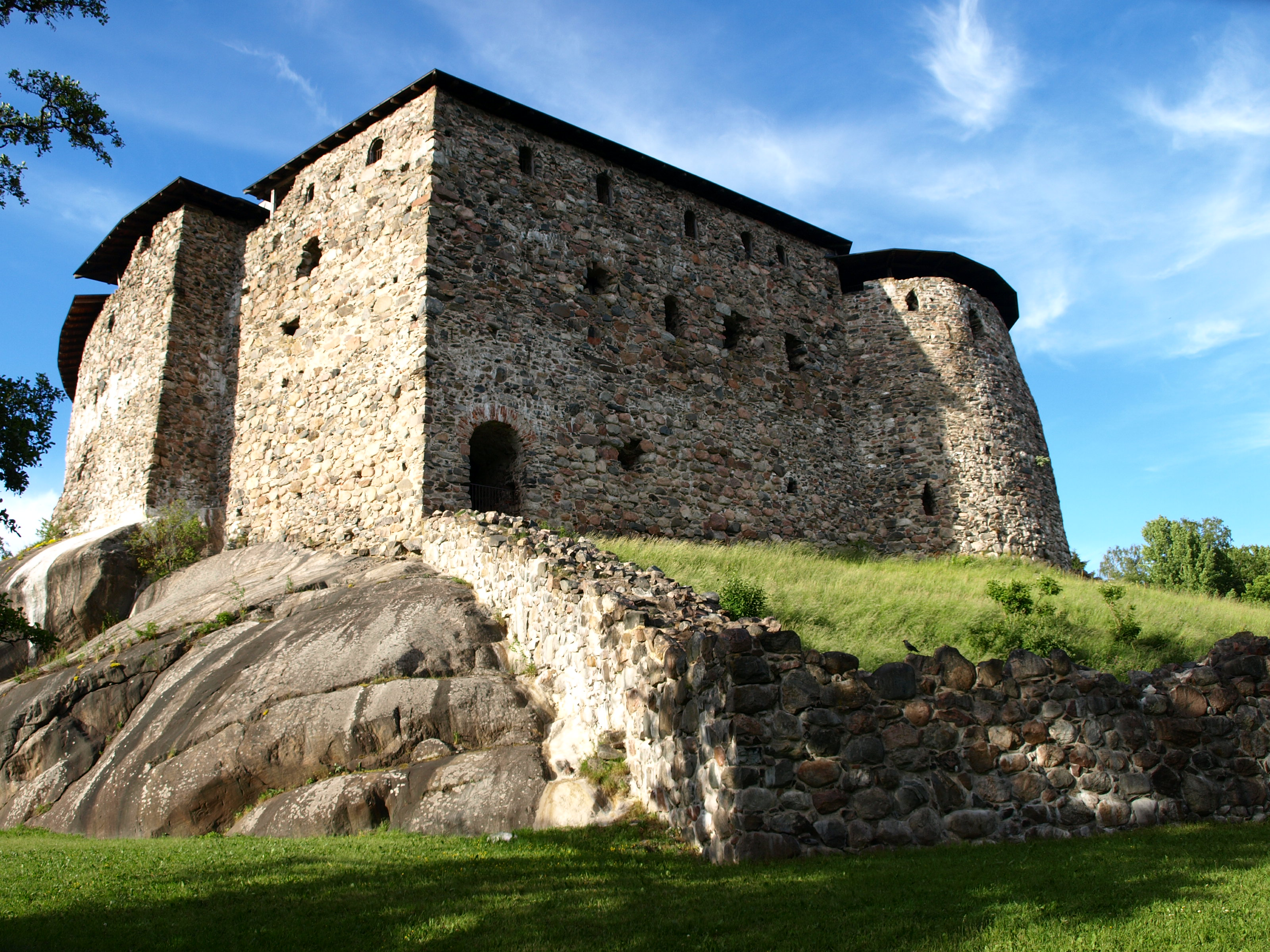
Raseborg Castle ruins, site of 1998 and 2014-2015 Faces
