= Wong–Baker Faces Pain Rating Scale =

Cartoon faces used to describe a sense of pain

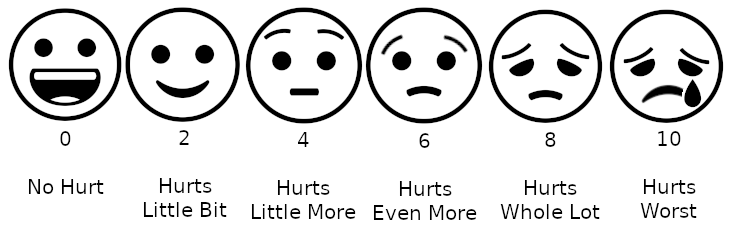
An emoji representation of the Wong-Baker scale

The Wong–Baker Faces Pain Rating Scale is a pain scale that was developed by Donna Wong and Connie Baker. The scale shows a series of faces ranging from a happy face at 0, or "no hurt", to a crying face at 10, which represents "hurts like the worst pain imaginable". Based on the faces and written descriptions, the patient chooses the face that best describes their level of pain.

There are 6 faces in the Wong-Baker Pain Scale. The first face represents a pain score of 0, and indicates "no hurt". The second face represents a pain score of 2, and indicates "hurts a little bit". The third face represents a pain score of 4, and indicates "hurts a little more". The fourth face represents a pain score of 6, and indicates "hurts even more". The fifth face represents a pain score of 8, and indicates "hurts a whole lot"; the sixth face represents a pain score of 10, and indicates "hurts worst".

This pain scale was originally developed for children. However, it can be used with all patients age 3 and above. It is useful for children because they may not understand rating their pain on a scale of 0-10, but are able to understand the cartoon faces and the emotions they represent and point to the one that "best matches their level of pain". This pain scale is also appropriate for patients who do not know how to count, and those who may have impaired brain function. Cultural sensitivity of the scale was also assessed to determine its applicability and acceptance across different cultures, and "research supports cultural sensitivity of FACES for Caucasian, African-American, Hispanic, Thai, Chinese, and Japanese children".
