= Clinical global impression =

Measures of patients with mental disorders

The clinical global impression (CGI) rating scales are measures of symptom severity, treatment response and the efficacy of treatments in treatment studies of patients with mental disorders. It is a brief 3-item observer-rated scale that can be used in clinical practice as well as in researches to track symptom changes. It was developed by Early Clinical Drug Evaluation Program (ECDEU) team of researchers for use in NIMH-led clinical trials that could provide clinical judgment based assessment for determining the severity of symptoms and the treatment progress. This was meant to assess the patient's functioning prior to and after initiating medication in trials which is an important part of study process. Its 3 items assess, 1) Severity of Illness (CGI-S), 2) Global Improvement (CGI-I), and 3) Efficacy Index (CGI-E, which is a measure of treatment effect and side effects specific to drugs that were administered). Many researchers, while recognizing the validity of the scale, consider it to be subjective as it requires the user of the scale to compare the subjects to typical patients in the clinician experience.

== Validity of CGI scales ==
Despite its wider acceptance and consistent use in clinical trials, psychometric properties of CGI have not been established. However, the scale is found to be valid as an external criterion during the development of scales of depression and anxiety. In many studies, the clinicians' ratings of psychiatric symptoms were found to correlate significantly with self-rated and other valid scales of symptom severity. For example, Leon et al. (1993) showed that severity ratings but not improvement ratings were predicted highly and significantly by frequency of panic attacks, depression and anxiety ratings made on already valid rating scales. Similarly, another study showed that MADRS, HAM-D and CGI scales had comparable effect sizes and could be equally used in studies to assess severity and improvement of symptoms. Even though many studies have established the validity of CGI scales in relation to other commonly used robust rating scales, its efficacy in predicting treatment outcomes is highly debated. Its sensitivity is good enough to differentiate between responders and non-responders in clinical trials of depression, but its specificity is not satisfactory. It has poorer interrater reliability than HAM-D. Many weaknesses could explain this possible lack of validity of the CGI: there is no specific interviewer guide available, and while most other symptoms scales have fairly clear and specific response options, the response format used in the CGI to assess change or severity of illness is more likely to be ambiguous (what is the definition of a patient who is "Severely ill"?).

== Severity scale ==
The clinical global impression – severity scale (CGI-S) is a 7-point scale that requires the clinician to rate the severity of the patient's illness at the time of assessment, relative to the clinician's past experience with patients who have the same diagnosis. Clinicians ask: "Considering your total clinical experience with this particular population, how ill is the patient at this time?" Possible ratings are:

1. Normal, not at all ill
2. Borderline mentally ill
3. Mildly ill
4. Moderately ill
5. Markedly ill
6. Severely ill
7. Among the most extremely ill patients

== Improvement scale ==
The clinical global impression – improvement scale (CGI-I) is a 7-point scale that requires the clinician to assess how much the patient's illness has improved or worsened relative to a baseline state at the beginning of the intervention. Clinicians ask: "Compared to the patient's condition at baseline, this patient's [average] condition has...?" and rated as:

1. Very much improved
2. Much improved
3. Minimally improved
4. No change
5. Minimally worse
6. Much worse
7. Very much worse

== Efficacy index ==
The clinical global impression – efficacy Index is a 4×4 rating scale that assesses the therapeutic effect of treatment with psychiatric medication and associated side effects.

Therapeutic effect	Side effects			
Therapeutic effect	None	Do not significantly interfere with patient's functioning	Significantly interfere with patient's functioning	Outweigh therapeutic effect
Marked – Vast improvement. Complete or nearly complete remission of all symptoms				
Moderate – Decided improvement. Partial remission of symptoms				
Minimal – Slight improvement which doesn't alter status of care of patient				
Unchanged or worse				

== See also ==
- Diagnostic classification and rating scales used in psychiatry
- Outcomes research
