= Brief Pain Inventory =

- Purpose: measures pain

The Brief Pain Inventory is a medical questionnaire used to measure pain, developed by the Pain Research Group of the WHO Collaborating Centre for Symptom Evaluation in Cancer Care. The Brief Pain Inventory (BPI) is widely used around the world today to help with measuring a patients' pain intensity and the amount of interference the pain has on their being able to function in everyday life. BPI was originally intended to help measure cancer patients pain, but today it is used in cancer related cases as well as non-cancer related cases.

There are two categories in the Brief Pain Inventory: Pain Intensity and Pain Interference. In Pain Interference two dimensions help discover different problems that need to be accessed to accurately treat the patient. These two dimensions being: Activity Interference and Affective Interference. Activity interference deals with general activity or more physical aspects of daily life such as walking. Affective Interference deals with emotional or internal aspects of daily life such as enjoyment of life and/or mood. Pain Intensity is measured in four categories: worst, least, on average, and currently, while Pain Interference is measured in 7 categories: mood, work, general activity, walking, relationships, enjoyment of life, and sleep. The patient rates each of these on a scale from 0–10, 10 being excruciating pain intensity and a complete interference in their life.
