= FLACC scale =

Measurement used to assess pain in children

- Synonyms: Face, Legs, Activity, Cry, Consolability scale
- Purpose: used to assess pain in children

The FLACC scale or Face, Legs, Activity, Cry, Consolability scale is a measurement used to assess pain for children between the ages of 2 months and 7 years or individuals that are unable to communicate their pain. The scale is scored in a range of 0–10 with 0 representing no pain. The scale has five criteria, which are each assigned a score of 0, 1 or 2.

Criteria	Score 0	Score 1	Score 2
Face	No particular expression or smile	Occasional grimace or frown, withdrawn, uninterested	Frequent to constant quivering chin, clenched jaw
Legs	Normal position or relaxed	Uneasy, restless, tense	Kicking, or legs drawn up
Activity	Lying quietly, normal position, moves easily	Squirming, shifting, back and forth, tense	Arched, rigid or jerking
Cry	No cry (awake or asleep)	Moans or whimpers; occasional complaint	Crying steadily, screams or sobs, frequent complaints
Consolability	Content, relaxed	Reassured by occasional touching, hugging or being talked to, distractible	Difficult to console or comfort

The FLACC scale has also been found to be accurate for use with adults in intensive-care units (ICU) who are unable to speak due to intubation. The FLACC scale offered the same evaluation of pain as did the Checklist of Nonverbal Pain Indicators (CNPI) scale which is used in ICUs.
