= Turnabout =

Turnabout may refer to:

== Television ==
=== Shows ===
- Turnabout (TV series), a 1979 United States TV series
- Turnabout (game show), a 1990s BBC TV quiz programme

=== Episodes ===
- "Turn About", The Tom and Jerry Show (2014) season 1, episode 14a (2014)
- "Turn About", Yin Yang Yo! season 2, episode 7b (2008)
- "Turnabout", Armored Trooper Votoms episode 18 (1983)
- "Turnabout", Eight Is Enough season 1, episode 5 (1977)
- "Turnabout", He-Man and the Masters of the Universe (2002) episode 11 (2002)
- "Turnabout", Highlander: The Series season 2, episode 13 (1993)
- "Turnabout", It Takes a Thief (1968) season 1, episode 12 (1968)
- "Turnabout", It Takes Two (American) episode 2 (1982)
- "Turnabout", Logan's Run episode 13 (1978)
- "Turnabout", Nowhere Man (American) episode 2 (1995)
- "Turnabout", Private Secretary season 4, episode 8 (1955)
- "Turnabout", Sergeant Preston of the Yukon season 2, episode 13 (1956)
- "Turnabout", Starcom: The U.S. Space Force episode 10 (1987)
- "Turnabout", The Adventures of Long John Silver episode 10 (1958)
- "Turnabout", The Event episode 13 (2011)
- "Turnabout", The Fantastic Journey episode 8 (1977)
- "Turnabout", The F.B.I. season 6, episode 24 (1971)
- "Turnabout", The New Adventures of Zorro (1981) episode 5 (1981)
- "Turnabout", The Tab Hunter Show episode 17 (1961)
- "Turnabout", Strike Force episode 14 (1982)
- "The Turnabout", The Care Bears Family season 3, episode 8a (1988)

== Literature ==
- Turnabout (Smith novel), a 1931 body swap novel
- Turnabout (Haddix novel), a 2000 novel by Margaret Peterson Haddix
- "Turnabout", a one-page Disney comic by Carl Barks
- Roswell: Turnabout, a 2003 novel by Andy Mangels and Michael A. Martin; the eleventh novel based on the television series Roswell
- Predator: Turnabout, a 2008 novel by Steve Perry
- Turnabout, a 2015 novella by Robert J. Randisi

== Other media ==
- Turnabout (film), a 1940 comedy directed by Hal Roach, based on a novel by Thorne Smith (see above)
- Turnabout (video game), a puzzle video game by Artdink
- Turnabout, a subsidiary record label of Vox Records
- Turnabout, a former member of the Haunted Mound, a music collective founded by Sematary

== Places ==
- Turnabout Glacier, Ellesmere Island, Nunavut, Canada
- Turnabout Lake, Qikiqtaaluk Region, Nunavut, Canada
- Turnabout River, Ellesmere Island, Nunavut, Canada
- Turnabout Theatre, a 1940–1950s venue in the city of Los Angeles

== Other uses ==
- Another name for Sadie Hawkins dance
- Used in every English chapter name of every Ace Attorney game; in Japanese, the game series is called "Turnabout Trial"

== See also ==
- Turnaround (disambiguation)
- Turn Around (disambiguation)
