= About Face =

An 'about-face is a drill command in which a unit or soldier makes a 180-degree turn.

About Face may also refer to:

== Film ==
- About Face (1942 film), a 1942 American film
- About Face (1952 film), starring Gordon MacRae and Eddie Bracken
- About Face (2008 film), a Canadian film starring Hugh Dillon
- About Face: Supermodels Then and Now, 2012 American documentary film
- About Face, a 1991 film by Norman Cowie

== Literature ==
- About Face (play), by Dario Fo
- About Face: The Essentials of User Interface Design, a book by Alan Cooper (software designer)
- About Face: The Odyssey of an American Warrior, an autobiography by U.S. Army Colonel David Hackworth
- About Face (novel), volume 18 in Donna Leon's Brunnetti series (2009)
- About Face, a short comic by Nate Powell

== Music ==
- About Face (album), 1984, by David Gilmour
- About Face, an album by The Working Title

== Television ==
=== Series ===
- About Face (TV series), a 1989–1991 British sitcom
- About Face (New Zealand TV series), a 1986 New Zealand anthology series
- About Faces, a 1960s American game show

=== Episodes ===
- "About Face" (As Told by Ginger)
- "About Face" (The Closer)
- "About Face" (Criminal Minds)
- "About Face" (CSI: Miami)
- "About Face" (Duckman)
- "About Face" (Major Dad)
- "About Face" (NCIS)
- "About Face", an episode of Army Wives
- "About Face", an episode of Tales from the Crypt

== Other uses ==
- AboutFace (charity), a Canadian charity providing support for children with facial disfigurations
- About Face Media, a content marketing agency
- About Face: Veterans Against the War, former Iraq War veterans, Afghanistan War veterans, and others who are opposed to the U.S. military invasion and occupation in Iraq from 2003 to 2011
- Operation About Face or Project About Face, a military operation of the Laotian Civil War

== See also ==
- Reverse ferret, a sudden reversal of a narrative
- U-turn (disambiguation)
- Turn Around (disambiguation)
- Turnaround (disambiguation)
