= Judge Daly Promontory =

Peninsula in Nunavut, Canada

Coordinates: 81°15′N 66°59′W

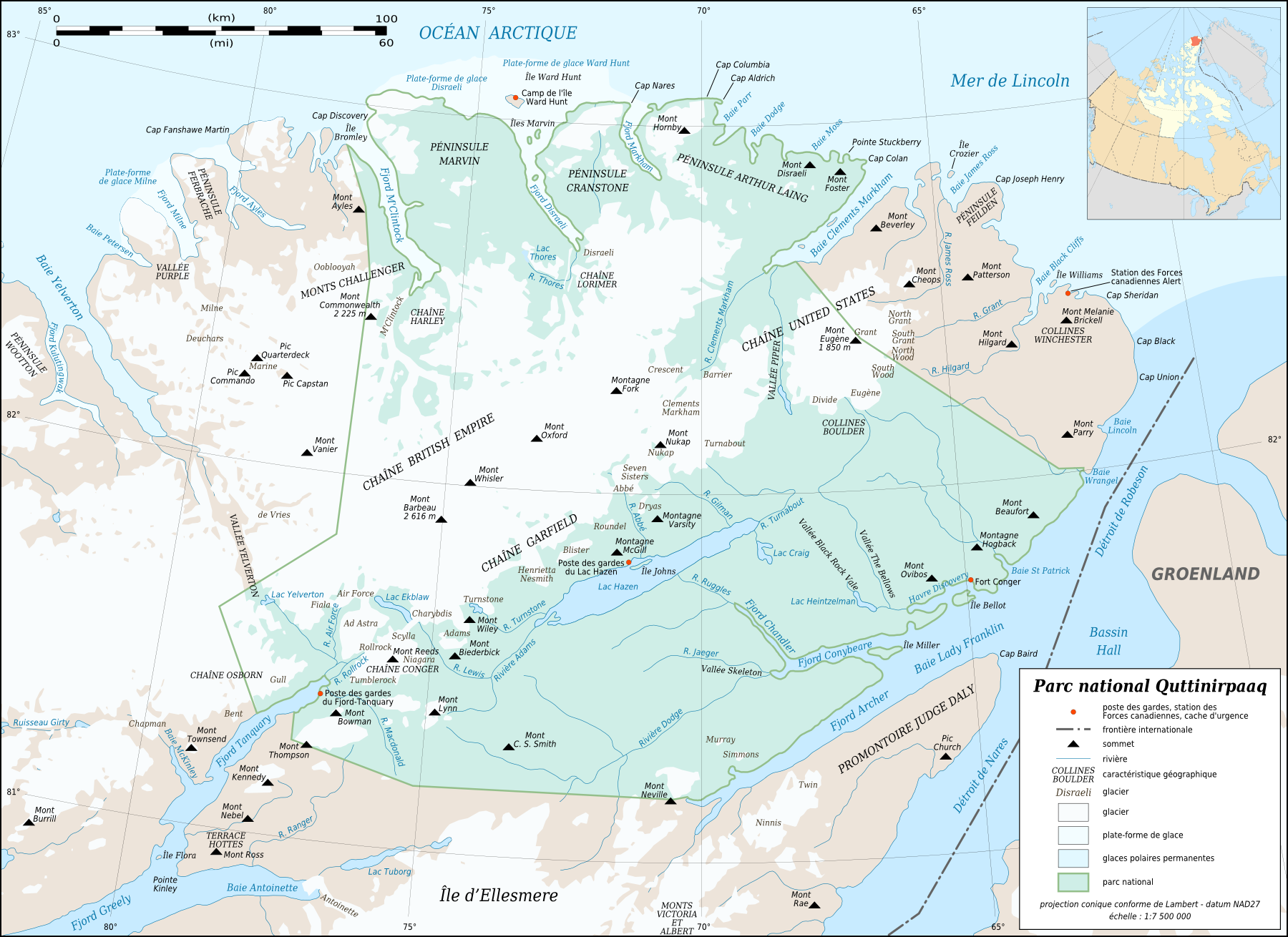
Map of Quttinirpaaq National Park, showing Judge Daly Promontory south of Fort Conger.

The Judge Daly Promontory is a peninsula located on the eastern coast of Ellesmere Island, a part of the Qikiqtaaluk Region of the Canadian territory of Nunavut. It stretches from the southwest northeastward into Nares Strait. Lady Franklin Bay is to the north, Archer Fiord to the west, and Cape Baird is its northernmost point.

This geographic feature was named after Judge Charles P. Daly, president of the American Geographical Society and founding member of the Peary Arctic Club.
