= Ruggles River =

Coordinates: 81.702°N 69.293°W

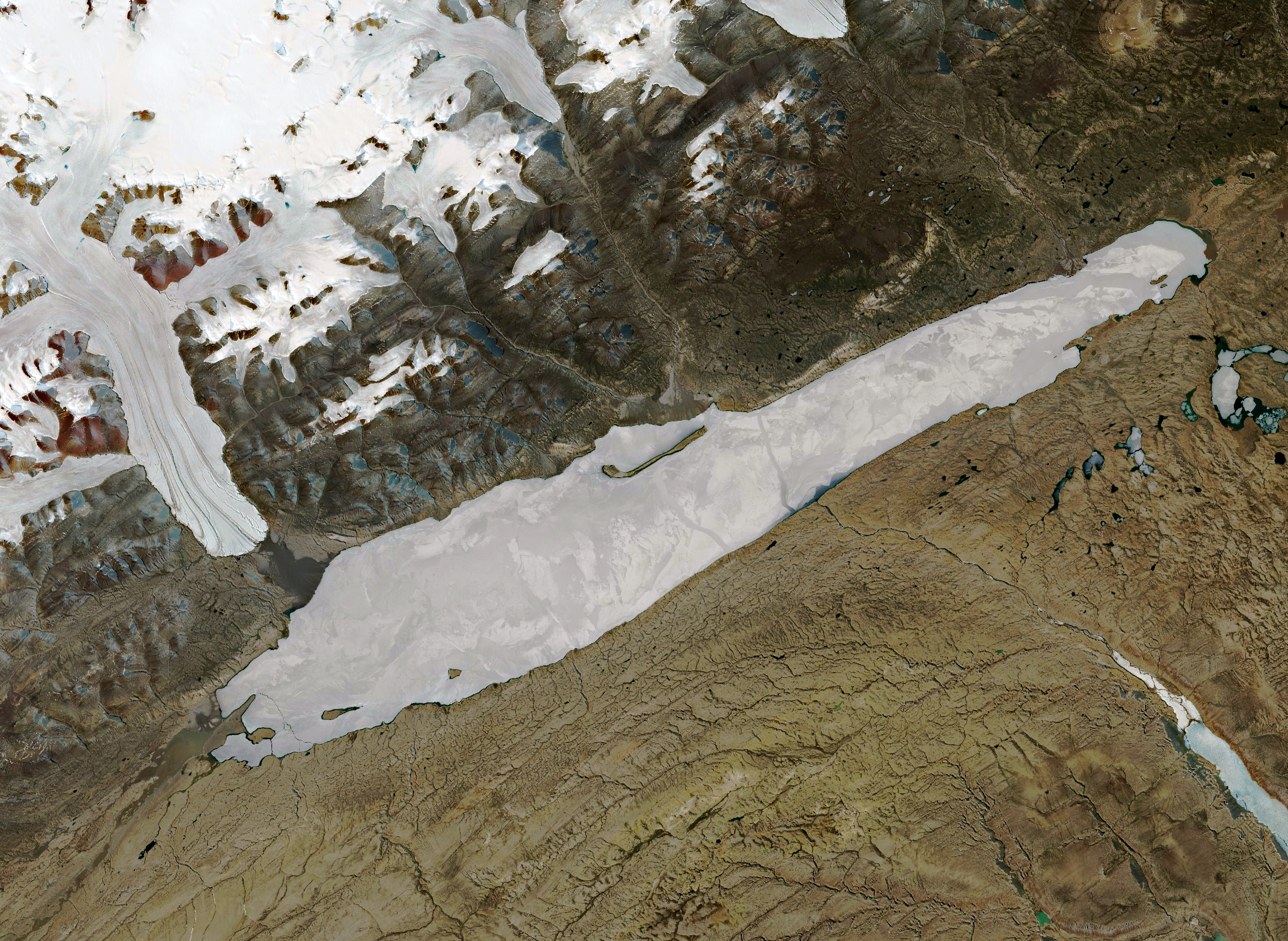

- Location of mouth

Location
- Country: Canada
- Territory: Nunavut

Physical characteristics
- Source: Lake Hazen
  - location: Ellesmere Island
- Mouth: Lady Franklin Bay

The Ruggles River is a waterway in Qikiqtaaluk Region, Nunavut, Canada. It is located within Ellesmere Island's Quttinirpaaq National Park. The Ruggles River flows southeast to Chandler Fiord and out to Lady Franklin Bay.

It is the most high-latitude of the known rivers, whose watercourse persists throughout the year without drying out or freezing of the channel in winter. The inflow of water in winter is provided by Lake Hazen, in the middle part of which its source is located. But during exceptionally cold years, the Ruggles River can freeze to the bottom in winter due to the low level of the lake.

The river drops 157 m (515 ft) in elevation between its source and its mouth. At less than 1.5 m (4.9 ft) deep, it is quite shallow. It is populated by Arctic char.

== History ==
In 1958, a 13th-century winter house was excavated along the Ruggles River.

== See also ==
- List of rivers of Nunavut
