= Grinnell Land =

Section of Ellesmere Island in Nunavut

Coordinates: 80°0′N 77°0′W

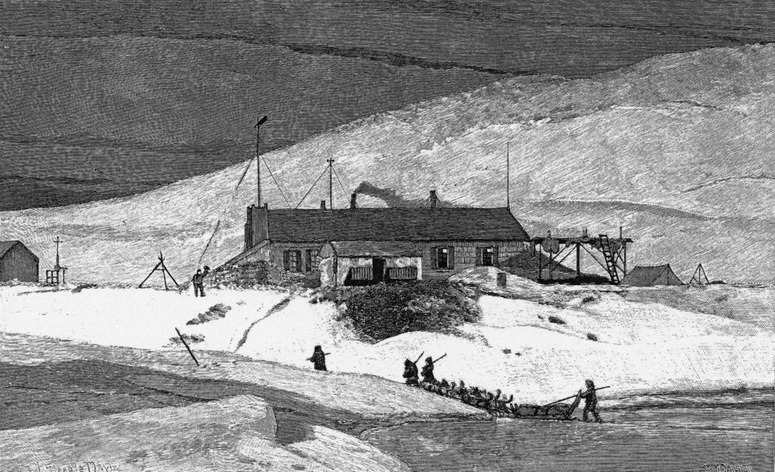
Fort Conger in Grinnell Land, May 20, 1883

Grinnell Land is the central section of Ellesmere Island in the northernmost part of Nunavut territory in Canada. It was named for Henry Grinnell, a shipping magnate from New York, who in the 1850s helped finance two expeditions to search for Franklin's lost expedition.

Grinnell Land is also a name given by Captain Edwin De Haven for land now known as the Grinnell Peninsula of Devon Island, to the southwest of Ellesmere Island. He sighted the peninsula's mountaintops on 22 September 1850 during the First Grinnell Expedition. De Haven substantiated the name in his official report of the voyage, dated October 1851.

Grinnell Land is part of Quttinirpaaq National Park.

Fort Conger is located the northern shore of Lady Franklin Bay in Grinnell Land, across Bellot Island.
