= Dyas (disambiguation) =

Dyas is an oil and gas company headquartered in the Netherlands.

Dyas may also refer to:

- Dyas (king), 11th-century Indian king of the Chudasama dynasty
- DYAS, a Philippine radio station
- Dyas Island, Nunavut, Canada
- B. H. Dyas, a defunct department store in California, US
- Robert Dyas, a UK hardware and houseware retailer
- An archaic name for the Permian period

== People with the surname ==
- Ada Dyas (1843–1908), Irish actress
- Alexander Dyas (1886–1958), Canadian physician and political figure
- Dave Dyas, rugby league footballer of the 1970s and 1980s
- Ed Dyas (1939–2011), American football player
- Guy Hendrix Dyas (born 1968), English film production designer
- Kevin Dyas (born 1987), Irish Gaelic and Australian rules footballer

== See also ==
- Phalonidia dyas, a species of moth
- DYA (disambiguation)
