= List of Canadian airports by location indicator: CJ =

This is a list of all Nav Canada certified and registered water and land airports, aerodromes and heliports in the provinces and territories of Canada sorted by location identifier.

They are listed in the format:

- Location indicator – IATA – Airport name (alternate name) – Airport location

== CJ – Canada – CAN ==
Also see airport category and list.

TC LID	IATA	Airport name	Community	Province or territory
CJA2		Selkirk Aerodrome	Selkirk	Ontario
CJA3		Morden Regional Aerodrome	Morden	Manitoba
CJA5		Nestor Falls Airport	Nestor Falls	Ontario
CJA6		Minaki Aerodrome	Minaki	Ontario
CJA7		Arcola Airport	Arcola	Saskatchewan
CJA9		Hudson Water Aerodrome	Hudson	Ontario
CJB2		Carman/Friendship Field Airport	Carman	Manitoba
CJB3		Steinbach Airport	Steinbach	Manitoba
CJB5		Moosomin/Marshall McLeod Field Aerodrome	Moosomin	Saskatchewan
CJB6		Gods Lake Airport	Gods Lake	Manitoba
CJB7		Buffalo Narrows Water Aerodrome	Buffalo Narrows	Saskatchewan
CJB8		Kyle Airport	Kyle	Saskatchewan
CJC2		Craik Airport	Craik	Saskatchewan
CJC3		Davidson Municipal Airport	Davidson	Saskatchewan
CJC4		Central Butte Airport	Central Butte	Saskatchewan
CJC5		Shaunavon Airport	Shaunavon	Saskatchewan
CJC6		Hafford Airport	Hafford	Saskatchewan
CJC7		Burditt Lake Water Aerodrome	Burditt Lake	Ontario
CJC8		Laurie River Airport	Laurie River	Manitoba
CJD2		Cudworth Municipal Airport	Cudworth	Saskatchewan
CJD3		Birch Hills Airport	Birch Hills	Saskatchewan
CJD5		Leader Airport	Leader	Saskatchewan
CJD6		Sand Point Lake Water Aerodrome	Sand Point Lake	Ontario
CJD7		Cambridge Bay Water Aerodrome	Cambridge Bay	Nunavut
CJD8		Dryden Water Aerodrome	Dryden	Ontario
CJD9		Ignace Water Aerodrome	Ignace	Ontario
CJE3		Weyburn Airport	Weyburn	Saskatchewan
CJE4		Snow Lake Airport	Snow Lake	Manitoba
CJE5		Glaslyn Airport	Glaslyn	Saskatchewan
CJE7		Ashern Airport	Ashern	Manitoba
CJE8		Ear Falls Water Aerodrome	Ear Falls	Ontario
CJE9		Lake Joseph/Eagle Island Heliport	Lake Joseph	Ontario
CJF2		Carignan/Rivère l'Acadie Water Aerodrome	Carignan	Quebec
CJF3		Île-à-la-Crosse Airport	Île-à-la-Crosse	Saskatchewan
CJF4		Buffalo (Jaques Farms) Aerodrome	Buffalo	Alberta
CJF6		Armstrong Water Aerodrome	Armstrong	Ontario
CJF8		Biggar Airport	Biggar	Saskatchewan
CJG2		Eatonia (Elvie Smith) Municipal Airport	Eatonia	Saskatchewan
CJG4		Wrong Lake Airport	Wrong Lake	Manitoba
CJG6		Kenora (Lake of The Woods District Hospital) Heliport	Kenora	Ontario
CJH3		Maidstone Aerodrome	Maidstone	Saskatchewan
CJH6		Atikokan Water Aerodrome	Atikokan	Ontario
CJH8		Leask Airport	Leask	Saskatchewan
CJJ2		Glenboro Airport	Glenboro	Manitoba
CJJ3		Wildwood/Loche Mist Farms Aerodrome	Wildwood	Alberta
CJJ4		Deloraine Airport	Deloraine	Manitoba
CJJ5		Cabri Airport	Cabri	Saskatchewan
CJJ7		Churchill Water Aerodrome	Churchill	Manitoba
CJJ8		Eye Hill Municipal Airport (Macklin Aerodrome)	Macklin	Saskatchewan
CJK2		Gunisao Lake Airport	Gunisao Lake	Manitoba
CJK3		Beauval Airport	Beauval	Saskatchewan
CJK4		Esterhazy Airport	Esterhazy	Saskatchewan
CJK5		Gull Lake Airport	Gull Lake	Saskatchewan
CJK6		Baker Lake Water Aerodrome	Baker Lake	Nunavut
CJK8		Flin Flon/Channing Water Aerodrome	Flin Flon	Manitoba
CJK9		Preeceville Airport	Preeceville	Saskatchewan
CJL2		Hatchet Lake Airport	Hatchet Lake	Saskatchewan
CJL4		La Loche Airport	La Loche	Saskatchewan
CJL5		Winnipeg/Lyncrest Airport	Lyncrest	Manitoba
CJL7		Confederation Lake Water Aerodrome	Confederation Lake	Ontario
CJL8		Kasba Lake Airport	Kasba Lake	Northwest Territories
CJM2		Ituna Airport	Ituna	Saskatchewan
CJM4		Gravelbourg Airport	Gravelbourg	Saskatchewan
CJM5		Frontier Airport	Frontier	Saskatchewan
CJM6		Arborfield Airport	Arborfield	Saskatchewan
CJM8		Fort Frances Water Aerodrome	Fort Frances	Ontario
CJM9		Kenora Water Aerodrome	Kenora	Ontario
CJN2		Kamsack Airport	Kamsack	Saskatchewan
CJN3		Ignace (MBCHC) Heliport	Ignace	Ontario
CJN4		Assiniboia Airport (RCAF Station Assiniboia)	Assiniboia	Saskatchewan
CJN5		Saskatoon/Banga Air Aerodrome	Saskatoon	Saskatchewan
CJN7		Little Churchill River/Dunlop's Fly In Lodge Aerodrome	Little Churchill River	Manitoba
CJN8		Fort Reliance Water Aerodrome	Fort Reliance	Northwest Territories
CJO2		Joliette/Saint-Thomas Aerodrome	Saint-Thomas	Quebec
CJO3		Kars/Jenkins Cove Water Aerodrome	Kars	New Brunswick
CJP2		Kerrobert Airport	Kerrobert	Saskatchewan
CJP3		Savant Lake (Sturgeon Lake) Water Aerodrome	Savant Lake	Ontario
CJP4		Saskatoon (Jim Pattison Children's Hospital) Heliport	Saskatoon	Saskatchewan
CJP5		Kasba Lake Water Aerodrome	Kasba Lake	Northwest Territories
CJP6		Camsell Portage Airport	Camsell Portage	Saskatchewan
CJP7		Bird River (Lac du Bonnet) Airport	Lac du Bonnet	Manitoba
CJP8		Gillam Water Aerodrome	Gillam	Manitoba
CJP9		Charlot River Airport	Charlot River Power Station	Saskatchewan
CJQ2		Lampman Airport	Lampman	Saskatchewan
CJQ3		Carlyle Airport	Carlyle	Saskatchewan
CJQ4		Maple Creek Airport	Maple Creek	Saskatchewan
CJQ6	JQ6	Tanquary Fiord Airport	Tanquary Fiord	Nunavut
CJQ8		Maryfield Aerodrome	Maryfield	Saskatchewan
CJQ9		Big Sand Lake Airport	Sand Lakes Provincial Park	Manitoba
CJR2		Luseland Airport	Luseland	Saskatchewan
CJR3		The Pas/Grace Lake Airport	The Pas	Manitoba
CJR4		Eston Airport	Eston	Saskatchewan
CJR5		Gladstone Aerodrome	Gladstone	Manitoba
CJR8		McCreary Airport	McCreary	Manitoba
CJS2		Malcolm Island Airport	Reindeer Lake	Saskatchewan
CJS4		Moose Jaw Municipal Airport	Moose Jaw	Saskatchewan
CJS5		Killarney Municipal Airport	Killarney	Manitoba
CJS6		Big Hook Wilderness Camp Water Aerodrome	Opasquia Provincial Park	Ontario
CJS7		Carman (South) Airport	Carman	Manitoba
CJS9		Lac du Bonnet (North) Water Aerodrome	Lac du Bonnet	Manitoba
CJT3		Knee Lake Airport	Knee Lake	Manitoba
CJT4		Cumberland House Airport	Cumberland House	Saskatchewan
CJT5		Melita Airport	Melita	Manitoba
CJT8		Homewood Airport	Homewood	Manitoba
CJU3		Macdonald Airport	MacDonald	Manitoba
CJU4		Humboldt Airport	Humboldt	Saskatchewan
CJU5		Minnedosa Airport	Minnedosa	Manitoba
CJU6		Arborg Airport	Arborg	Manitoba
CJU7		Edam Airport	Edam	Saskatchewan
CJV2		Neilburg Airport	Neilburg	Saskatchewan
CJV5		Neepawa Airport	Neepawa	Manitoba
CJV7	SUR	Summer Beaver Airport	Nibinamik First Nation	Ontario
CJV8		Grand Rapids Aerodrome	Grand Rapids	Manitoba
CJW2		Oxbow Airport	Oxbow	Saskatchewan
CJW3		Loon Lake Airport	Loon Lake	Saskatchewan
CJW4		Pelican Narrows Airport	Pelican Narrows	Saskatchewan
CJW5		Russell Airport	Russell	Manitoba
CJW7		Cigar Lake Airport	Cigar Lake mine	Saskatchewan
CJW8		Gunisao Lake Water Aerodrome	Gunisao Lake	Manitoba
CJX3		La Ronge Heliport	La Ronge	Saskatchewan
CJX4		Rosetown Airport	Rosetown	Saskatchewan
CJX5		Souris Glenwood Industrial Air Park	Souris	Manitoba
CJX6		Bird River Water Aerodrome	Lac du Bonnet	Manitoba
CJX8		Hatchet Lake Water Aerodrome	Hatchet Lake	Saskatchewan
CJY3	YTT	Tisdale Airport	Tisdale	Saskatchewan
CJY4		Sandy Bay Airport	Sandy Bay	Saskatchewan
CJY5		Strathclair Airport	Strathclair	Manitoba
CJY6		Bissett Water Aerodrome	Bissett	Manitoba
CJZ2		Portage la Prairie (North) Airport	Portage la Prairie	Manitoba
CJZ3		Melfort (Miller Field) Aerodrome	Melfort	Saskatchewan
CJZ4		Shellbrook Airport	Shellbrook	Saskatchewan
CJZ6		Black Lake Water Aerodrome	Black Lake	Saskatchewan
CJZ9		La Ronge Water Aerodrome	La Ronge	Saskatchewan
