= Through the Noise =

Video by Comeback Kid
- Released: October 14, 2008
- Recorded: Leipzig, Germany
- Genre: Hardcore punk
- Length: 37:22
- Label: Smallman (Canada); Victory (Rest of World)

Comeback Kid chronology
Broadcasting... (2007)	Through the Noise (2008)	Symptoms + Cures (2010)

Professional ratings
Review scores
Source	Rating
Allmusic	3/5 stars
ChartAttack	3/5 stars

Through the Noise, the first live CD/DVD from Comeback Kid, was released on October 14, 2008. The concert was filmed in Leipzig, Germany on November 23, 2007. It also features an hour-long documentary of the band.

== CD track listing ==
No.	Title	Length
1.	"False Idols Fall"	3:03
2.	"Die Tonight"	2:48
3.	"Broadcasting..."	3:49
4.	"Partners In Crime"	2:56
5.	"Changing Face"	2:19
6.	"Industry Standards"	3:39
7.	"Defeated"	3:34
8.	"All In A Year" (Featuring Rick Jimenez from This Is Hell)	2:29
9.	"Step Ahead"	1:50
10.	"Talk Is Cheap"	1:53
11.	"The Trouble I Love"	1:56
12.	"Hailing On Me"	2:57
13.	"Our Distance"	1:54
14.	"Lorelei"	2:57
15.	"Wake The Dead"	3:50
16.	"Give'r (Reprise)"	1:25
17.	"Final Goodbye"	2:54
Total length:		37:22

== DVD material ==
'Live In Leipzig' Concert (Track listing above)
'Our Distance' Documentary (67 Min.)
Broadcasting... (Music Video)
Wake The Dead (Original Version) (Music Video)
Wake The Dead (Monster Version) (Music Video)
