= Operation Hazen =

Canadian scientific expedition

- Part of the International Geophysical Year (IGY) Camp Hazen (Canada) Camp Hazen (Nunavut)
- Duration: 1957–1959
- Location: Camp Hazen, Nunavut, Canada; 81°49′N 71°20′W
- Participants: Geoffrey Hattersley-Smith

Operation Hazen was a Canadian programme of meteorological, glaciological and geological work undertaken as part of the International Geophysical Year. The investigations took place between 1957 and 1959 at Lake Hazen on Ellesmere Island, Nunavut, Canada. The programme was led by English-born geologist Geoffrey Hattersley-Smith. Organised by the Defence Research Board, twenty scientists took part in the operation, including officers from the Fisheries Research Board, the Geological Survey, the Human History and Natural History branches of the National Museum, the Canadian Wildlife Service, and members of McGill University, the University of Toronto, the University of Alberta, and Michigan State University.

== Name ==
In 1882 American polar explorer Adolphus Greely was the first European to discover Lake Hazen during his 1881–1883 expedition and named the lake in honour of General William Babcock Hazen who had organized the expedition. Operation Hazen took its name from the lake.

== 1957–58 ==
Between 28 April and 3 May the Royal Canadian Air Force flew in seven members of the party. A bulldozer dropped from the first flight was used to clear nine inches of snow to form a 3,500 foot airstrip. Two tractors, two dog teams and 35 tonnes of supplies and equipment were then subsequently flown in by a C119 aircraft.

A party of six carried out glaciological, glacial-meteorological, and seismic survey studies on Gilman Glacier between April and August 1957. Meanwhile, two geologists worked from Hazen Camp, the main camp established on the shores of Lake Hazen. The glaciological work used seismic and gravity methods to determine ice thickness.

Four meteorologists wintered at the base camp from August 1957 to April 1958. From April to August 1958, studies continued on Gilman Glacier, and further studies took place on the ice cap to the north of Lake Hazen, the Lake Hazen basin and other parts of northern Ellesmere Island. Twelve members, stationed at the base camp, carried out meteorological, geological, limnological, geomorphological, botanical, zoological and archaeological investigations.

== 1959 ==
Glaciological, meteorological and botanical research was conducted on Gilman Glacier in the summer of 1959.

During the spring and autumn re-supply operations, the expedition was supported by the United States Coast Guard, the United States Navy, and the United States Air Force.

== See also ==
- Queen Elizabeth Islands
