= Bellot Island =

Island in Nunavut, Canada

- Interactive map of Bellot Island

Geography
- Location: Northern Canada
- Coordinates: 81°41′N 065°00′W
- Archipelago: Queen Elizabeth Islands; Arctic Archipelago

Administration
- Canada
- Territory: Nunavut

Demographics
- Population: Uninhabited

Bellot Island is an Arctic island in Quttinirpaaq National Park, Qikiqtaaluk Region, Nunavut, Canada. It is located in Lady Franklin Bay, across from Ellesmere Island's Fort Conger.

Reindeer and muskoxen frequent the island. Though there are no permanent settlements, archaeological research has found evidence of Inuit hearths.

It is named for the French Arctic explorer, Joseph René Bellot.
