= Clay Island =

Island within Qikiqtaaluk Region, Nunavut, Canada

- Location within Nunavut Location within Canada

Geography
- Location: Lake Hazen
- Coordinates: 81.918°N 69.077°W
- Archipelago: Arctic Archipelago

Administration
- Canada
- Nunavut: Nunavut
- Region: Qikiqtaaluk

Demographics
- Population: Uninhabited

Clay Island is an uninhabited island within Qikiqtaaluk Region, Nunavut, Canada. An island within an island, it is located in Lake Hazen on Ellesmere Island within Quttinirpaaq National Park. The larger Gatter Island lies off its northern shore.
