= Symptoms + Cures =

Studio album by Comeback Kid
- Released: August 31, 2010
- Recorded: March 12 – April 8, 2010 at Vespa Studios
- Studios: Company X Audio in Toronto, Ontario and Metalworks Studios in Mississauga, Ontario
- Genres: Hardcore punk, melodic hardcore
- Length: 39:57
- Labels: Distort (Canada), Victory (rest of the world), Cargo Music (outside Canada)
- Producers: Eric Ratz, Kenny Luong, Comeback Kid

Comeback Kid chronology
Through the Noise (2008)	Symptoms + Cures (2010)	Die Knowing (2014)

Singles from Symptoms + Cures

Professional ratings
Review scores
Source	Rating
AbsolutePunk.net	(86%)
Rock Sound	(9/10)
Thrash Hits	(5/6)
Allmusic	3/5 stars

Symptoms + Cures is the fourth studio album by Canadian hardcore punk band Comeback Kid. It was released on August 31, 2010. It's the band's first album released through Distort Entertainment after their previous record label Smallman Records went out of business. It's also distributed in the US through Victory Records. Symptoms + Cures was recorded with Eric Ratz and Kenny Luong, both of which have previously worked with the Canadian punk bands Cancer Bats and Billy Talent.

The release is the second studio album to feature Andrew Neufeld as a vocalist after the 2007 album, Broadcasting.... Neufeld previously played guitar for Comeback Kid and only began to sing for the band after the former vocalist Scott Wade left in 2006. Drummer Kyle Profeta commented on Comeback Kid's second album working with Neufeld as a vocalist, "we have really found our sound with him and we are all really excited about it."

== Track listing ==
Source: Distort Entertainment

No.	Title	Length
1.	"Do Yourself a Favor"	2:30
2.	"Crooked Floors"	3:12
3.	"G.M. Vincent & I"	3:33
4.	"Because of All"	3:38
5.	"The Concept Stays" (featuring Nuno Pereira of A Wilhelm Scream)	3:06
6.	"Balance" (featuring Liam Cormier of Cancer Bats)	4:03
7.	"Symptoms + Cures"	3:55
8.	"Manifest"	3:57
9.	"Get Alone"	4:16
10.	"Magnet Pull"	2:49
11.	"Pull Back the Reins" (featuring Sam Carter of Architects)	5:01
Total length:		39:57

== Personnel ==
Comeback Kid

- Jeremy Hiebert – guitar
- Andrew Neufeld – vocals
- Kyle Profeta – drums
- Casey Hjelmberg – guitar
- Matt Keil – bass

Guest musicians

- Nuno Pereira (A Wilhelm Scream) – vocals on "The Concept Stays"
- Liam Cormier (Cancer Bats) – vocals on "Balance"
- Sam Carter (Architects) – vocals on "Pull Back the Reins"

Artwork and design

- Michael Bukowski – illustrations
- Jason Link – design, layout
- Scott Wade – logo
- Eric Levin – photography

Production and recording

- Eric Ratz – production, engineering, mixing
- Kenny Luong – production, engineering, mixing
- Comeback Kid – production, engineering
- Jeff Crake – assisted engineering
- Chris Snow – assisted engineering
- Scott Lake – mastering
- Alan Riches – guitar technician, drum technician
- Greg Below – additional engineering
- Craig Pattison – additional technical support
- Nicole Hughes – additional technical support
- Gavin Brown – additional technical support
- Marcio Sargento – additional technical support
- Michael T. Fox – additional technical support
- Steve Evetts – engineering (Sam Carter's vocals)
- Clint Billington – A&R
- Tony Brummel – A&R
