= William Babcock Hazen =

United States Army general (1830–1887)

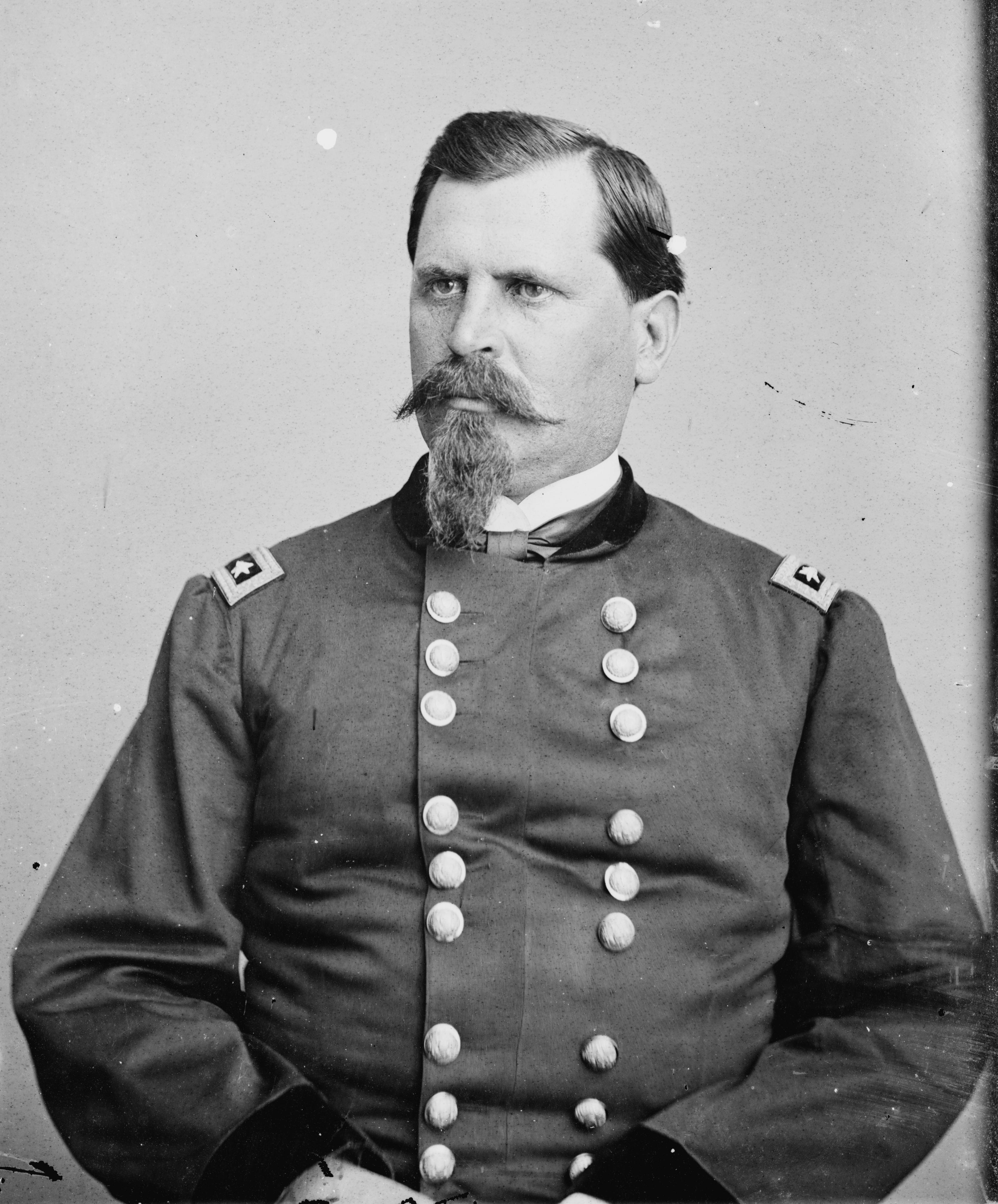
- Born: September 27, 1830; West Hartford, Vermont, US
- Died: January 16, 1887 (aged 56); Washington, D.C., US
- Burial place: Arlington National Cemetery
- Military career
- Allegiance: United States; Union
- Branch: United States Army; Union Army
- Service years: 1855–1887
- Rank: Major General
- Commands: XV Corps; US Army Signal Corps
- Conflicts: American Indian Wars; American Civil War; Battle of Stones River; Battle of Fort McAllister

William Babcock Hazen (September 27, 1830 – January 16, 1887) was a career United States Army officer who served in the Indian Wars, as a Union general in the American Civil War, and as Chief Signal Officer of the U.S. Army. His most famous service was defending "Hell's Half Acre" at the Battle of Stones River in 1862, and seizing Fort McAllister, Georgia, in December 1864, which allowed William Sherman to capture Savannah at the end of his March to the Sea.

== Early life and military career ==
Hazen was born in West Hartford, Vermont, but moved to Ohio at the age of three. He spent his boyhood in the town of Hiram and formed a close personal friendship with future President James A. Garfield. He graduated from the United States Military Academy, in 1855, and was commissioned a second lieutenant in the 4th U.S. Infantry. Before the Civil War, he served primarily in the Pacific Northwest and Texas, where he was wounded severely on November 3, 1859, during a fight with the Comanches along the Llano River. He was absent on sick leave until 1861.

== Civil War ==
Soon after the fall of Fort Sumter, he was promoted to captain of the 8th U.S. Infantry, and by October 29, 1861, he was Colonel of the 41st Ohio Infantry. Starting in January 1862, he commanded a brigade in the Army of the Ohio, under Maj. Gen. Don Carlos Buell. His first major battle was Shiloh, where Buell's army arrived on the second day (April 7, 1862), in time to counterattack the Confederate army for a Union victory.

In the fall of 1862, Hazen fought under Buell at Perryville. His brigade was reorganized into the XIV Corps (later to be known as the Army of the Cumberland) under Maj. Gen. William S. Rosecrans, and, in this organization, Hazen served in his most famous engagement, the Battle of Stones River, at Murfreesboro, Tennessee. On December 31, 1862, the Confederate forces under Gen. Braxton Bragg delivered a devastating assault that caught Rosecrans by surprise and drove his forces back three miles (5 km), leaving their backs to the Stones River. Hazen's brigade defended a small cedar forest known by the locals as "Round Forest". Hazen and Brig. Gen. Charles Cruft were at a salient in the Union line, whose loss would have given the Confederate a complete victory. Maj. Gens. George H. Thomas and Lovell H. Rousseau, Hazen's division commander, concentrated artillery to support them. Several Confederate attacks were beaten off. Their defense was so spirited against heavy odds that they arguably saved the Union line. The 4-acre (16,000 m^{2}) Round Forest is now known informally as "Hell's Half Acre". Hazen was wounded in the shoulder during the fight and was promoted to brigadier general, effective November 29, for his gallantry. Months after the battle, a monument was erected by veterans of the fight in a small Union cemetery at the site. This is considered to be the oldest Civil War monument remaining in its original battlefield location.

Hazen continued with the Army of the Cumberland through the successful Tullahoma Campaign, the serious Union defeat at the Battle of Chickamauga in XXI Corps, and the victorious Battle of Chattanooga in IV Corps. Hazen's brigade played a major role in the crossing at Brown's Ferry near Chattanooga that, together with the arrival of troops under Maj. Gen. Joseph Hooker, opened the line of supply or "Cracker Line" to the Army of the Cumberland, penned into its defenses by the Confederates. Hazen was promoted to brevet major in the regular army for Chickamauga and brevet lieutenant colonel for Chattanooga. He served under Maj. Gen. William T. Sherman in the Atlanta campaign, the March to the Sea, and the Carolinas campaign, in the Army of the Cumberland and then in the Army of the Tennessee. He distinguished himself at the Battle of Pickett's Mill while still leading a brigade in IV Corps. His brigade had to attack without adequate support and suffered badly. Later, asked where his brigade was, Hazen replied, "Brigade, Hell, I have none. But what is left of it is over there in the woods."

Hazen was elevated to division command in XV Corps late in the Atlanta Campaign. During Sherman's March to the Sea, Hazen's division distinguished itself in the capture of Fort McAllister, Georgia, on December 13, 1864. This action opened communications between Sherman's army group and the United States Navy. He was promoted to brevet colonel in the regular army in September 1864 and to major general of volunteers on December 13, 1864. Very late in the war, he commanded the XV Corps of the Army of the Tennessee and was eventually promoted to brevet major general in the regular army, March 13, 1865.

== Postbellum career ==
As the U.S. Army was drawn down following the war, Hazen was redesignated as colonel of the 38th U.S. Infantry (a Buffalo Soldier regiment, one of four such infantry regiments) in July 1866 and transferred to the 6th U.S. Infantry in March 1869. He served primarily on the Western frontier, including being stationed at Fort Buford in the Dakota Territory from 1872 to 1880, but he also visited Europe as an observer during the Franco-Prussian War. One of Hazen's most important roles on the frontier was handling the negotiations that preceded the Battle of Washita River. Hazen offered testimony in one of the procurement corruption scandals that rocked the administration of President Ulysses S. Grant, which resulted in the resignation of Grant's Secretary of War, William W. Belknap. The Belknap scandal was tied to other disputes over promotions and squabbles over credit for victories in the Civil war. One of the squabbles pitted Hazen against Maj. Gen. David S. Stanley over the exact location of the monument at Stone's River. Stanley, who was fighting other generals over credit for the Union victory at the Second Battle of Franklin, argued that the monument was in the wrong place. Stanley was a friend of Belknap, which ties the controversies together.

Hazen also engaged in controversy by criticizing George Armstrong Custer's book Life on the Plains in one of his own books. (Custer had criticized Hazen's dealings with chief Black Kettle before Washita River.) Hazen's relationships with Custer and with his superiors in the post-war army were such that the writer Ambrose Bierce called him "The best hated man I ever knew". Hazen even managed to offend Lt. Gen. William T. Sherman, a former friend and an ally against Belknap.

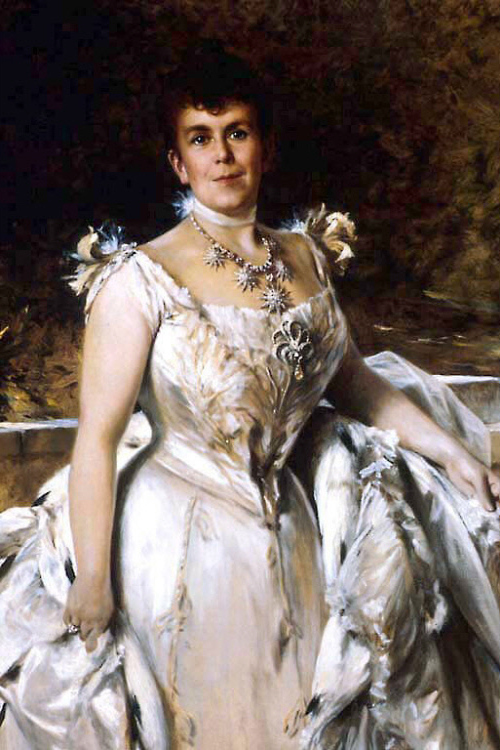
Mildred McLean

On December 15, 1880, President Rutherford B. Hayes promoted Hazen to brigadier general and appointed him Chief Signal Officer of the U.S. Army, a post he held until his death. His tenure was noted for focusing his department on basic research, rather than the practical matters that occupied his predecessor, Albert J. Myer.

But Hazen continued to generate public controversy. At the time, the U.S. Army Signal Corps managed the Weather Service, and Hazen criticized the government's lack of response to the distress of the International Polar Year expedition to Fort Conger, Lady Franklin Bay (on Ellesmere Island, Canada). The expedition, led by Lieutenant Adolphus Greely, departed in the summer of 1881, and in 1882, a scheduled resupply effort failed, leaving the 25 men of the expedition without support to survive the winter about 500 miles (800 km) from the North Pole. In 1883 a rescue party commanded by Lt. Ernest A. Garlington also failed to rescue the stranded party. By the time the rescue expedition of June 1884 reached Greely, only he and six of his command remained alive. Hazen publicly criticized Secretary of War Robert Todd Lincoln for his handling of the affair, citing his refusal to send further assistance after Garlington's rescue mission failed. Greely's wife, Henrietta, forced Lincoln to act in response to outraged public opinion, so Lincoln censured Hazen for his public criticisms and Hazen was court-martialed in 1885. His defense attorney was (former) Judge Thomas Jefferson Mackey, a Mexican American war veteran who had fought for the Confederacy in the Civil War, then backed Congressional Reconstruction, and later wrote books about the expedition. Ultimately, President Chester A. Arthur gave Hazen only a mild reprimand. The newspapers, however, backed Hazen against Secretary Lincoln.

== Personal life ==
Following the Civil War, Hazen married Mildred McLean (1847-1931), daughter of Washington McLean, the owner of The Washington Post, who did not accompany him on his posts in Indian Country. They had a son, John McLean Hazen (1876-1898, named to honor his uncle John Roll McLean) and a daughter, May (who died as an infant). A decade after Hazen's death, his widow married Admiral George Dewey on November 9, 1899.

== Death and legacy ==
Hazen died in Washington, D.C., having been taken ill after attending a reception held by President Grover Cleveland, and is buried in Arlington National Cemetery. The New York Times, in its obituary, called Hazen "aggressive and disputatious", traits that served him well on the battlefield but made him powerful enemies in peace time. Hazen, Nevada, and Hazen Bay in Alaska are named in his honor, as are Lake Hazen and Camp Hazen, both on Ellesmere Island.

== See also ==
- List of American Civil War generals (Union)
