= Whisler Island =

Island in Nunavut, Canada

- Location within Nunavut Location within Canada

Geography
- Location: Lake Hazen
- Coordinates: 81.668793°N 72.328105°W
- Archipelago: Arctic Archipelago

Administration
- Canada
- Nunavut: Nunavut
- Region: Qikiqtaaluk

Demographics
- Population: Uninhabited

Whisler Island is an uninhabited island within Qikiqtaaluk Region, Nunavut, Canada. An island within an island, it is located near the southern shore of Lake Hazen on Ellesmere Island within Quttinirpaaq National Park.

It was named for Private William Whisler, a member of the Lady Franklin Bay Expedition.
