= Johns Island (Nunavut) =

Island in Nunavut, Canada

- Location within Nunavut Location within Canada

Geography
- Location: Lake Hazen
- Coordinates: 81.818815°N 71.061265°W
- Archipelago: Arctic Archipelago

Administration
- Canada
- Nunavut: Nunavut
- Region: Qikiqtaaluk

Demographics
- Population: Uninhabited

Johns Island is an uninhabited island within Qikiqtaaluk Region, Nunavut, Canada. An island within an island, it is located in Lake Hazen on Ellesmere Island within Quttinirpaaq National Park. The island was named after an early French explorer and cartographer of the Arctic.

== Avifauna ==
The long-tailed jaeger has been found to breed on Johns Island and nearby Camp Hazen.
