= Gatter Island =

Island in Nunavut, Canada

- Location within Nunavut Location within Canada

Geography
- Location: Lake Hazen
- Coordinates: 81.918°N 69.093°W
- Archipelago: Arctic Archipelago

Administration
- Canada
- Nunavut: Nunavut
- Region: Qikiqtaaluk

Demographics
- Population: Uninhabited

Gatter Island is an uninhabited island within Qikiqtaaluk Region, Nunavut, Canada. An island within an island, it is located in Lake Hazen on Ellesmere Island within Quttinirpaaq National Park. The smaller Clay Island lies off its southern shore.
