= Turn Around =

Turn Around may refer to:

== Albums ==
- Turn It Around (Comeback Kid album)
- Turn Around (album), by Jonny Lang (2006)
- Turn Around, Look at Me (album), a studio album by The Vogues in 1968

== Songs ==
- Turn Around (Collective Soul song)
- "Turn Around" (Dick and Dee Dee song), written by Malvina Reynolds, Alan Greene, and Harry Belafonte
- "Turn Around" (Enigma song)
- "Turn Around" (Samantha Jade song)
- "Turn Around" (Conor Maynard song)
- "Turn Around" (Phats & Small song)
- "Turn Around" (5, 4, 3, 2, 1), a 2010 song by Flo Rida
- "Turn Around", a song by the Beau Brummels from Bradley's Barn
- "Turn Around", a song by Devo, a B-side from the single "Whip It"
- "Turn Around", a song by Neil Diamond from Primitive
- "Turn Around", a song by Heatwave from Candles
- "Turn Around", a song by Billy Joel from Cold Spring Harbor
- "Turn Around", a song by Carl Perkins
- "Turn Around", a song by They Might Be Giants on the album Apollo 18
- "Turn Around", a song by Westlife from Turnaround
- "Turn Around", a song by The Lottery Winners
- "Turn Around, Look at Me", a song written by Jerry Capehart and Glen Campbell, performed variously by Glen Campbell, The Lettermen, the Bee Gees, and The Vogues, and used in a 2019 Volkswagen commercial
- "Total Eclipse of the Heart", a song by Bonnie Tyler, with the refrain "Turn around"

== Other ==
- Turn Around (film), a 2017 Taiwanese film

== See also ==
- Turnaround (disambiguation)
- Turn It Around (disambiguation)
