= Broadcasting... =

Studio album by Comeback Kid
- Released: February 19, 2007
- Recorded: November 2006 at The Blasting Room, Ft. Collins, Colorado
- Genre: Hardcore punk
- Length: 33:08
- Labels: Smallman (Canada); Victory (Rest of World)
- Producers: Jason Livermore; Bill Stevenson; Comeback Kid

Comeback Kid chronology
Wake the Dead (2005)	Broadcasting... (2007)	Through the Noise (2008)

Professional ratings
Review scores
Source	Rating
AllMusic	3.5/5 stars
Relevant Magazine	(not rated)

Broadcasting... is the third studio album by Canadian hardcore punk band Comeback Kid. The album was released on February 19, 2007. It is the first album to feature Andrew Neufeld on lead vocals, following Scott Wade's departure. The album peaked at #129 on the Billboard 200, #3 on Top Heatseekers, and #10 on Top Independent Albums. It was the last album on which Kevin Call played bass.

"Broadcasting.." was used on the NHL 2K8 soundtrack.

== Track listing ==
No.	Title	Length
1.	"Defeated"	3:16
2.	"Broadcasting..."	3:53
3.	"Hailing on Me"	2:59
4.	"The Blackstone"	2:54
5.	"Industry Standards"	3:38
6.	"Give'r (Reprise)"	1:07
7.	"One Left Satisfied"	3:50
8.	"Come Around"	2:31
9.	"In Case of Fire"	2:50
10.	"Market Demands"	3:05
11.	"In/Tuition"	3:05
Total length:		33:08

The Japanese release of the album also includes a music video for the song "Wake the Dead" from the band's previous album.

== Critical reception ==
Matt Teutsch of Relevant Magazine said Broadcasting... continued Comeback Kid's previous sound on Turn It Around and Wake the Dead. Alternatively, Corey Apar of AllMusic said the album showed the band's strength after Wade left the band.

== Chart positions ==
Chart	Position
US Billboard 200	129
US Heatseekers Albums (Billboard)	3
US Independent Albums (Billboard)	10

== Personnel ==
- Andrew Neufeld – vocals, guitar
- Jeremy Hiebert – guitar
- Kyle Profeta – drums
- Kevin Call – bass
