= Turnabout Glacier =

Glacier in Canada

Coordinates: 82.145°N 67.766°W

Turnabout Glacier is located on Ellesmere Island, Nunavut, Canada. It is drained by the Turnabout River.

The glacier, the river and Turnabout Lake were named in 1957–58, during the International Geophysical Year, by the Hazen Camp party directed by Geoffrey Hattersley-Smith.

== See also ==
- List of glaciers
