= DYA =

DYA may refer to:

- Daytona Beach Thruway Motorcoach stop (Amtrak code: DYA), a Daytona Beach, Florida Amtrak station
- Demopolis Municipal Airport (FAA location identifier: DYA), a city-owned public-use airport
- DYA framework, an enterprise architecture framework developed by the consulting company Sogeti
- Dysart Airport (IATA code: DYA), an airport near Dysart, Queensland
