= Geoffrey Hattersley-Smith =

Canadian geologist (1923–2012)

Geoffrey Francis Hattersley-Smith D.Phil, FRSC, FRGS, FAINA (22 April 1923 – 21 July 2012) was an English-born Canadian geologist and glaciologist, recognized as a pioneering researcher of Northern Canada.

== Early life and education ==
Born in London in 1923, he attended school at Winchester College in Hampshire and read geology at New College, Oxford, followed later by a doctorate in glaciology.

From 1948 to 1950, he was the base leader for the Falkland Islands Dependencies Survey (now the British Antarctic Survey) on King George Island. He finished his master's degree in 1951.

== Career ==
In 1951, he became a staff member with the Canadian Defence Research Board (DRB) (now part of the Department of National Defence). With the DRB he was part of several expeditions to places such as the Saint Elias Mountains in Yukon and Cornwallis Island, Northwest Territories (now Nunavut). From 1953 to 1954 he led the joint Canada-United States expedition to Ellesmere Island. In 1956 he received a Doctor of Philosophy from Oxford for his work on Ellesmere's glaciers.

In 1957, he began 16 years of research on Ellesmere Island. As part of the International Geophysical Year (1957–1958) he went to Lake Hazen as part of Operation Hazen and until 1973 worked either there or at Ward Hunt Island. In 1963, he set up a camp and conducted field research at Tanquary Fiord. The teams that he led named over 50 features on Ellesmere Island, such as Barbeau Peak, the highest mountain on the island and Turnabout River. In 1961, he became the first person to climb Mount Whisler, second highest peak on Ellesmere, and on 5 June 1967 led the second team to reach the top of Barbeau Peak that day.

He was awarded the Patron's Medal of the Royal Geographical Society in 1966. He was elected to the Royal Society of Canada in 1970 and in 1973 he retired as head of the DRB's Geotechnical Section and returned to England.

After returning to England, he re-joined the British Antarctic Survey and was the secretary of the Antarctic Place-names Committee for the Foreign and Commonwealth Office in London. In 1984 the Advisory Committee on Antarctic Names named Cape Hattersley-Smith after him.

== Personal life ==
Hattersley-Smith had two Canadian-born children, Kara and Fiona.

In 1990 he retired to Kent. He died on 21 July 2012, at the family property where he had grown up.
