= Nansen Sound =

Strait in Nunavut, Canada

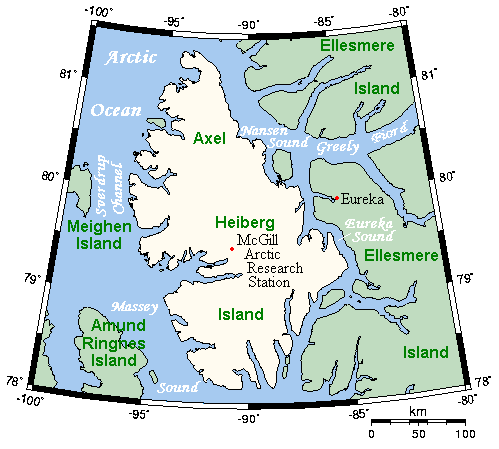
- Nansen Sound

- Location within Nunavut
- Coordinates: 80°21′N 086°51′W
- Basin countries: Canada
- Settlements: Uninhabited

Nansen Sound is an uninhabited strait in Qikiqtaaluk, Nunavut, Canada. It lies between western Grant Land on Ellesmere Island and Axel Heiberg Island. Tanquary Fiord or Greely Fiord enters the sound from the east.
