= Turnabout Lake =

Lake in Nunavut, Canada

- Location within Nunavut
- Location: Ellesmere Island, Nunavut
- Coordinates: 81°58′N 068°34′W
- Primary outflows: Turnabout River
- Basin countries: Canada
- Settlements: uninhabited

Turnabout Lake is a lake in Qikiqtaaluk Region, Nunavut, Canada. It is located northeast of Lake Hazen on Ellesmere Island, It is drained by the Turnabout River which flows into Lake Hazen.

The lake, the river and Turnabout Glacier were named in 1957-58 during the International Geophysical Year by the Hazen Camp party directed by Geoffrey Hattersley-Smith.
