= Turn It Around =

Turn It Around may refer to:

- Turn It Around!, a 1987 punk rock compilation album
- "Turn It Around" (Alena song), a 1998 song by Alena
- Turn It Around (Comeback Kid album), a 2003 album by Comeback Kid
- "Turn It Around" (Sub Focus song), a 2013 song by Sub Focus, featuring the vocals of Kele Okereke
- "Turn It Around", a song by K.Flay from the album Life as a Dog, 2014
- Turn It Around: The Story of East Bay Punk, a 2017 documentary film
- "Turn It Around", a song by Randy Travis, from the album I Told You So: The Ultimate Hits of Randy Travis
