= Die Knowing =

Studio album by Comeback Kid
- Released: March 4, 2014
- Genre: Hardcore punk
- Length: 32:45
- Label: Distort (Canada); Victory (worldwide)
- Producer: Kyle Black

Comeback Kid chronology
Symptoms + Cures (2010)	Die Knowing (2014)	Outsider (2017)

Singles from Die Knowing
- 1. "Should Know Better" Released: February 11, 2014

Die Knowing is the fifth studio album by Canadian hardcore punk band Comeback Kid. It was released on March 4, 2014.

== Track listing ==
No.	Title	Length
1.	"Die Knowing"	2:13
2.	"Lower the Line"	2:43
3.	"Wasted Arrows"	2:59
4.	"Losing Sleep" (featuring Poli Correia of Devil in Me)	2:40
5.	"Should Know Better"	2:24
6.	"I Depend, I Control"	1:38
7.	"Somewhere in This Miserable…"	2:46
8.	"Beyond"	2:12
9.	"Unconditional"	3:21
10.	"Didn't Even Mind"	3:29
11.	"Full Swing" (featuring Scott Wade)	1:56
12.	"Sink In"	4:06
Total length:		32:45

== Reception ==
Professional ratings
Review scores
Source	Rating
MusicReview.co.za	4.4/5 stars
All About the Rock	9/10 stars
HM Magazine	4/5 stars

Die Knowing has been well received by critics. Writing for All About the Rock, Mark Booth said: "This is an album that is full of songs that all seem like they would be perfect live and maybe that is what Comeback Kid were looking at getting on record, some of the live intensity and boy have they accomplished that!".

== Credits ==
Comeback Kid

- Andrew Neufeld – lead vocals, guitar
- Jeremy Hiebert – lead guitar, backing vocals
- Kyle Profeta – drums, percussion
- Matt Keil – bass, backing vocals
- Stu Ross – rhythm guitar, vocals

Guest musicians

- Poli Correia (Devil in Me) – vocals on "Losing Sleep"
- Scott Wade – vocals on "Full Swing"

Production

- Dave Quiggle – artwork
- Kyle Black – production, engineering, mixing
