= Dyas Island =

Island in Nunavut, Canada

- Location within Nunavut Location within Canada

Geography
- Location: Lake Hazen
- Coordinates: 81.702095°N 71.877976°W
- Archipelago: Arctic Archipelago

Administration
- Canada
- Nunavut: Nunavut
- Region: Qikiqtaaluk

Demographics
- Population: Uninhabited

Whisler Island is an uninhabited island within Qikiqtaaluk Region, Nunavut, Canada. An island within an island.

== Geography ==
it is located in Lake Hazen on Ellesmere Island within Quttinirpaaq National Park. It lies opposite Wagon Hill.
