= Turnabout River =

River in Nunavut, Canada

Coordinates: 81°56′00″N 68°52′00″W

The Turnabout River is located on Ellesmere Island, Nunavut, Canada. It drains both Turnabout Lake and Turnabout Glacier into Lake Hazen.

The river, the lake and Turnabout Glacier were named in 1957-58 during the International Geophysical Year by the Hazen Camp party directed by Geoffrey Hattersley-Smith. The river was named Turnabout due to its meandering course.

== See also ==
- List of rivers of Nunavut
