= Wake the Dead =

Studio album by Comeback Kid
- Released: February 22, 2005
- Recorded: October 8–21, 2004
- Studios: Blasting Room (Ft. Collins, Colorado)
- Genre: Hardcore punk
- Length: 25:46
- Labels: Smallman (Canada); Victory (Rest of World)
- Producer: Bill Stevenson

Comeback Kid chronology
Turn It Around (2003)	Wake the Dead (2005)	Broadcasting... (2007)

Professional ratings
Review scores
Source	Rating
AllMusic	3.5/5 stars
Jam!	4.5/5 stars

Wake the Dead is the second studio album by the Canadian hardcore punk band Comeback Kid. It was released on February 22, 2005. Bill Stevenson recorded it over 13 days at the Blasting Room in Fort Collins, Colorado. The album peaked at number 16 on Top Heatseekers and number 27 on Top Independent Albums. It was the final album with Scott Wade on vocals, with Andrew Neufeld taking over on the later releases.

The album's main hit, the title track, was used on the soundtrack of the video games Burnout Revenge and Burnout Legends. In 2025 the band re-recorded it for the album's 20th anniversary, with Neufeld commenting, "The song lands as the biggest moment in every single set that we've played — from Asia through South America to Europe, Africa, and North America."

== Track listing ==
No.	Title	Length
1.	"False Idols Fall"	2:38
2.	"My Other Side"	2:18
3.	"Wake the Dead"	3:17
4.	"The Trouble I Love"	1:52
5.	"Talk Is Cheap"	1:54
6.	"Partners in Crime"	2:22
7.	"Our Distance"	1:52
8.	"Bright Lights Keep Shining"	2:21
9.	"Falling Apart"	2:22
10.	"Losing Patience"	2:16
11.	"Final Goodbye"	2:34
Total length:		25:46

== Personnel ==
Credits adapted from the liner notes of Wake the Dead.

Comeback Kid

- Scott Wade – lead vocals
- Jeremy Hiebert – lead guitar, backing vocals
- Andrew Neufeld – rhythm guitar, backing vocals
- Kevin Call – bass guitar
- Kyle Profeta – drums

Other contributors

- Russ Rankin – additional vocals on "Our Distance"
- Luke Friesen & others – additional vocals on "Wake the Dead"
- Bill Stevenson – production, engineering
- Jason Livermore – production, engineering
- Alan Douches – mastering
- Jeremy Wabiszczewicz – layout, art
