= Charles P. Daly =

American politician

Charles Patrick Daly
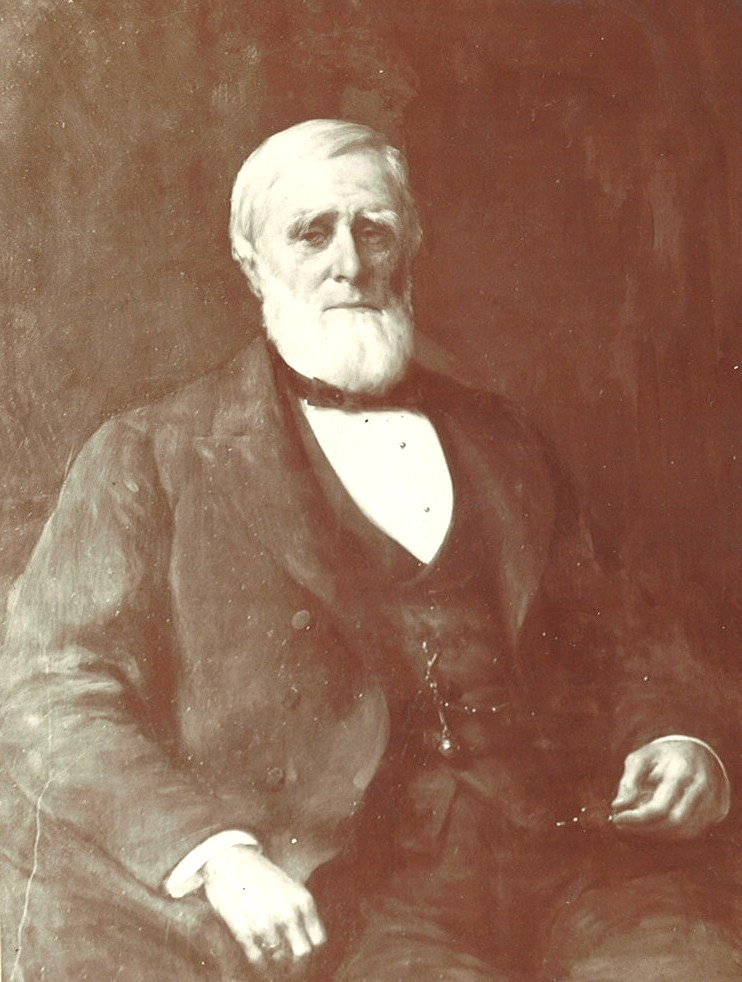

Chief Justice, New York Court of Common Pleas
- In office 1871–1885

First Judge, New York Court of Common Pleas
- In office 1857–1871
- Preceded by: Judge Danial Ingraham

Judge, New York Court of Common Pleas
- In office 1844–1857
- Appointed by: Governor William Bouck
- Preceded by: William Inglis

Assemblyman, New York State Assembly
- In office 1843–1844

Personal details
- Born: October 13, 1816 New York, New York, USA
- Died: September 19, 1899 (aged 82) North Haven, New York, USA
- Spouse: Maria Lydig

Charles Patrick Daly (October 13, 1816 – September 19, 1899) was a member of the New York State Assembly, Chief Justice of the New York Court of Common Pleas, president of the American Geographical Society, and an author of several books.

== Early life and education ==
The Daly ancestors were the O'Dalys of County Galway, Ireland. In 1814, two years before Daly's birth, his parents immigrated to the U.S. from Omagh, County Tyrone, Ireland. Daly was born in New York City, New York, USA. His father, Michael, had been a master carpenter in Ireland, but in New York City, he worked as the manager of a hotel on Broadway. His mother, Elizabeth, died when Daly was age three. Michael remarried.

Daly attended private school in his early years. Upon his father's death, Daly was unwilling to rely on a widowed stepmother, leading him to leave school and earn a living.

== Career ==
He worked first as a clerk in Savannah, Georgia, before becoming a cabin boy on a trading ship. During his three years as a sailor, he was present at the 1830 capture of Algiers. When he returned to New York in 1832, he became a mechanical trade apprentice for a quill manufacturer, and joined a literary society where he learned how to debate. This led to him becoming a law student and he was admitted to practice law in 1839.

In 1843, Daly was elected to the New York State Assembly, representing the Fourth Ward of New York City. While in office, he staunchly supported the establishment of Central Park against considerable opposition.

The following year, Judge William Inglis' term on the New York Court of Common Pleas expired. On a recommendation of Governor William Marcy, Governor William Bouck appointed Daly to the Court, beginning his term May 1844. When the position changed from an appointed one to an elected one in 1847, Daly ran for election and won, eventually becoming Chief Justice. One of his most notable cases dealt with the Astor Place Riot involving William Charles Macready at the Astor Place Theatre. He served on the court for six consecutive terms, retiring December 30, 1885 because of the constitutional age limit. Ten years later, the Court of Common Pleas was abolished, the judges becoming justices of the New York Supreme Court.

For fifteen years, starting in 1860, he lectured on law at Columbia Law School. In 1867, Daly was a member of the New York Constitutional Convention. After leaving the bench, he became a partner in the firm of Daly, Hoyt and Mason.

== Interests ==
=== American Geographical Society ===
Called an "armchair explorer" by some, Daly was elected as an Ordinary Member to the American Geographical Society on February 16, 1855, to the Governing Board in 1858, and to its presidency in 1864, a position he held until his death in 1899. As a member, and then president of the AGS, Daly was influential in supporting Arctic expeditions. Daly, a bibliophile, had a personal collection of more than 12,000 volumes. He donated 700 of his geographical books to the AGS on his 75th birthday and during his tenure as President, helped with the AGS's library collection expansion.

=== Other memberships ===
He was an honorary member of the Royal Geographical Society of London, England, the Berlin Geographical Society, and Russia's Imperial Geographical Society. In London in 1895, he was a speaker at the 6th International Geographical Congress.

In his early career years, he was a member of the New York Literary Society, the Law Association, Democratic Republican Young Men of the City and County of New York (vice-president), and New York Workingmen's Democratic Republican Association (recording-secretary).

Later, Daly was a member of the New York Historical Society, the American Philosophical Society of Pennsylvania, and the Century Association, St. Patrick's Society (president), and Committee for the Relief of Ireland (chairman).

Daly became a member of the Peary Arctic Club shortly before his death; the Daly Range in Greenland was named after him by Robert Peary.

== Personal life ==
Daly met Maria Lydig in 1855. Born in 1824, Maria was the daughter of Philip Mesier Lydig, Esq. (1799–1872) of New York. Philip Lydig was the last holder of the land that subsequently became the Bronx Park; the park now contains the New York Botanical Garden. Her mother, Katherine, was the eldest daughter of John Suydam, a Knickerbocker.

Like Daly, Maria was a Democrat and a Unionist. They married September 27, 1856 in West Farms, Westchester County, New York. At age 37, Maria began writing a diary, published as Diary of a Union lady, 1861-1865. She was active in the Democratic Party, the Women's Central Association for the Relief for the Army, and the New York Botanical Garden. She died at their summer home in North Haven, New York (near Sag Harbor) on August 21, 1894.

== Death and legacy ==
Like his wife, Daly died in North Haven in 1899, rather than at their home in New York City at 84 Clifton Place. His funeral service was held at New York's St. Patrick's Cathedral.

The home in North Haven passed on to Maria's niece, Emma Hoyt. Daly's papers, military record, lectures and diaries were donated to the New York Public Library by Emma. A portrait of Daly, painted by Daniel Huntington, hangs at the courtroom of what was the New York Court of Common Pleas.

== Honors ==
- 1860, LL.D. honorary degree conferred by Columbia University
- 1902, in accordance with Daly's Last Will and Testament, the American Geographical Society established the Charles P. Daly Medal to be awarded "for valuable or distinguished geographical services or labors"
- "Daly Avenue", in The Bronx, New York, leads to the Bronx Park
- Judge Daly Promontory in Ellesmere Island, Canada.

== Selected works ==
- (1855). Historical sketch of the judicial tribunals of New York from 1623 to 1846, OCLC 12144261
- (1860). Naturalization embracing the past history of the subject and the present state of the law, OCLC 20789871
- (1862). Are the southern privateersmen pirates?, OCLC 3836337
- (1872). Barratry. Its origin, history and meaning, in the maritime laws, OCLC 43957835
- (1893). The settlement of Jews in North America, OCLC 123142093
- (1896). First theater in America. When was the drama first introduced in America? An inquiry; including a consideration of the objections that have been made to the stage, OCLC 246813512
