= Dysart Airport =

- IATA: DYA; ICAO: YDYS

Summary
- Airport type: Private
- Operator: BHP Mitsubishi Alliance
- Location: Dysart, Queensland
- Elevation AMSL: 682 ft / 208 m
- Coordinates: 22°37′20″S 148°21′50″E

Map
- Location in Queensland

Runways
Direction	Length		Surface
Direction	m	ft	Surface
14/32	1,550	5,085	Paved
- Sources: Australian AIP and aerodrome chart

Dysart Airport (IATA: DYA, ICAO: YDYS) is an airport near Dysart, Queensland with one 1,550 m (5,085 ft) runway. It is 682 ft (208 m) above sea level. The airport has one runway, a 14/32.

Dysart Airport is privately owned by the BHP Mitsubishi Alliance (BMA). On 17 May 2013, BMA closed the airport to all but Royal Flying Doctor Service and Medivac flights, at the time promising to reveal a reopening strategy to Dysart Aero Club members.

As of 2025, the airport remains closed to all but medical flights. In the latest edition of the ERSA, BMA has deregistered the airport.
