= Tanquary Fiord Airport =

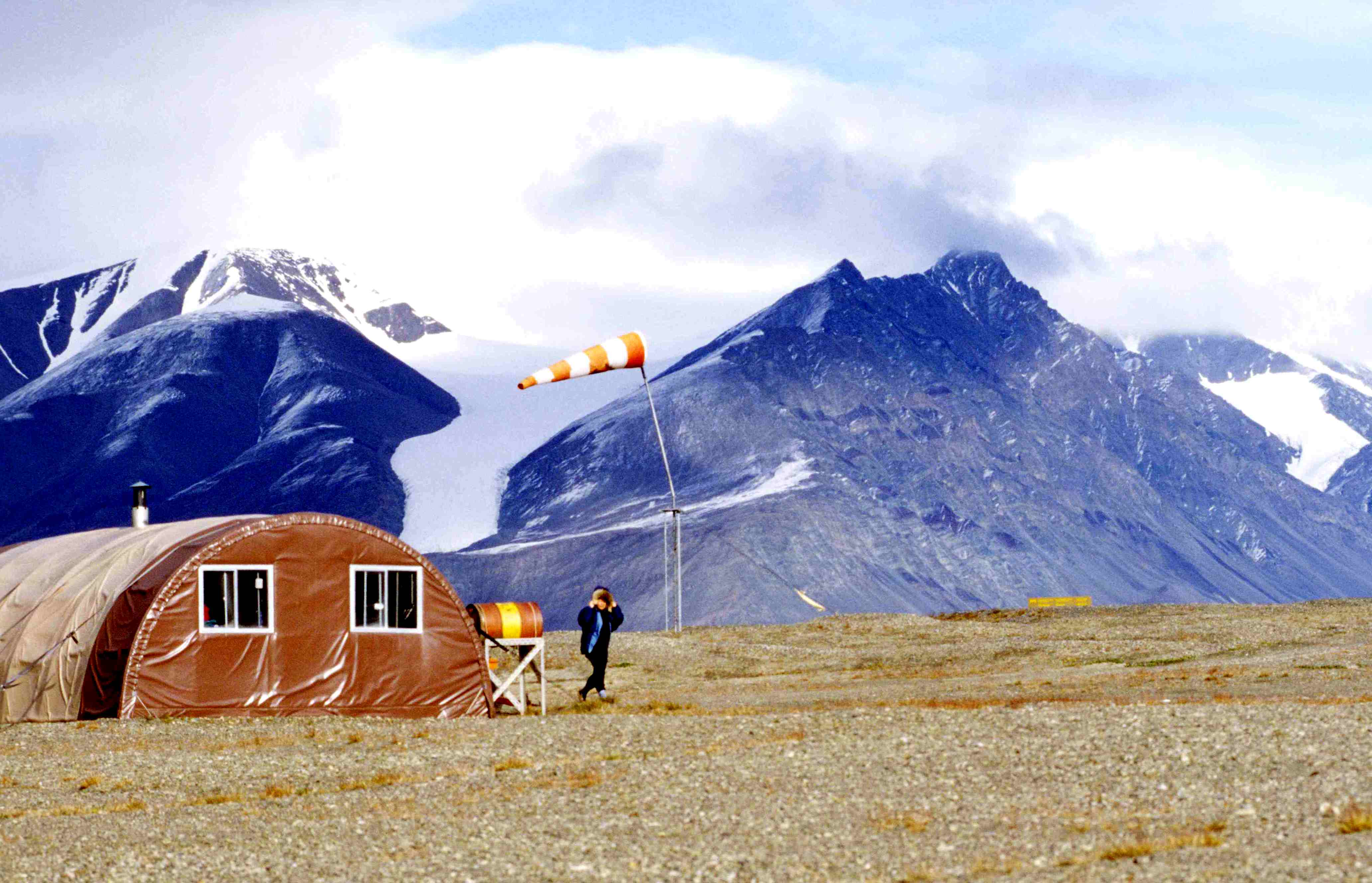
- Tanquary Camp and wind sock at Tanquary Fiord Airport
- IATA: none; ICAO: none; TC LID: CJQ6

Summary
- Airport type: Private
- Operator: Parks Canada
- Serves: Quttinirpaaq National Park
- Location: Tanquary Fiord, Nunavut
- Time zone: EST (UTC−05:00)
  - Summer (DST): EDT (UTC−04:00)
- Elevation AMSL: 50 ft / 15 m
- Coordinates: 81°24′34″N 076°52′54″W

Map
- Location in Nunavut

Runways
Direction	Length		Surface
Direction	ft	m	Surface
03/21	3,700	1,128	Gravel
- Source: Canada Flight Supplement

Tanquary Fiord Airport (TC LID: CJQ6) is located at the southern side of Tanquary Fiord, Nunavut, Canada, close to the end of the fiord. It is located within Quttinirpaaq National Park and is maintained by Parks Canada. It serves as the main access to the park for tourists. Hikers to Lake Hazen, which is located 70 km (43 mi) to the northeast, start from Tanquary Camp.

The aerodrome sketch for Tanquary Fiord is probably the simplest in the Canada Flight Supplement; it has nothing on it but a runway and an unlit wind sock.
