= Comeback Kid (band) =

Canadian hardcore punk band

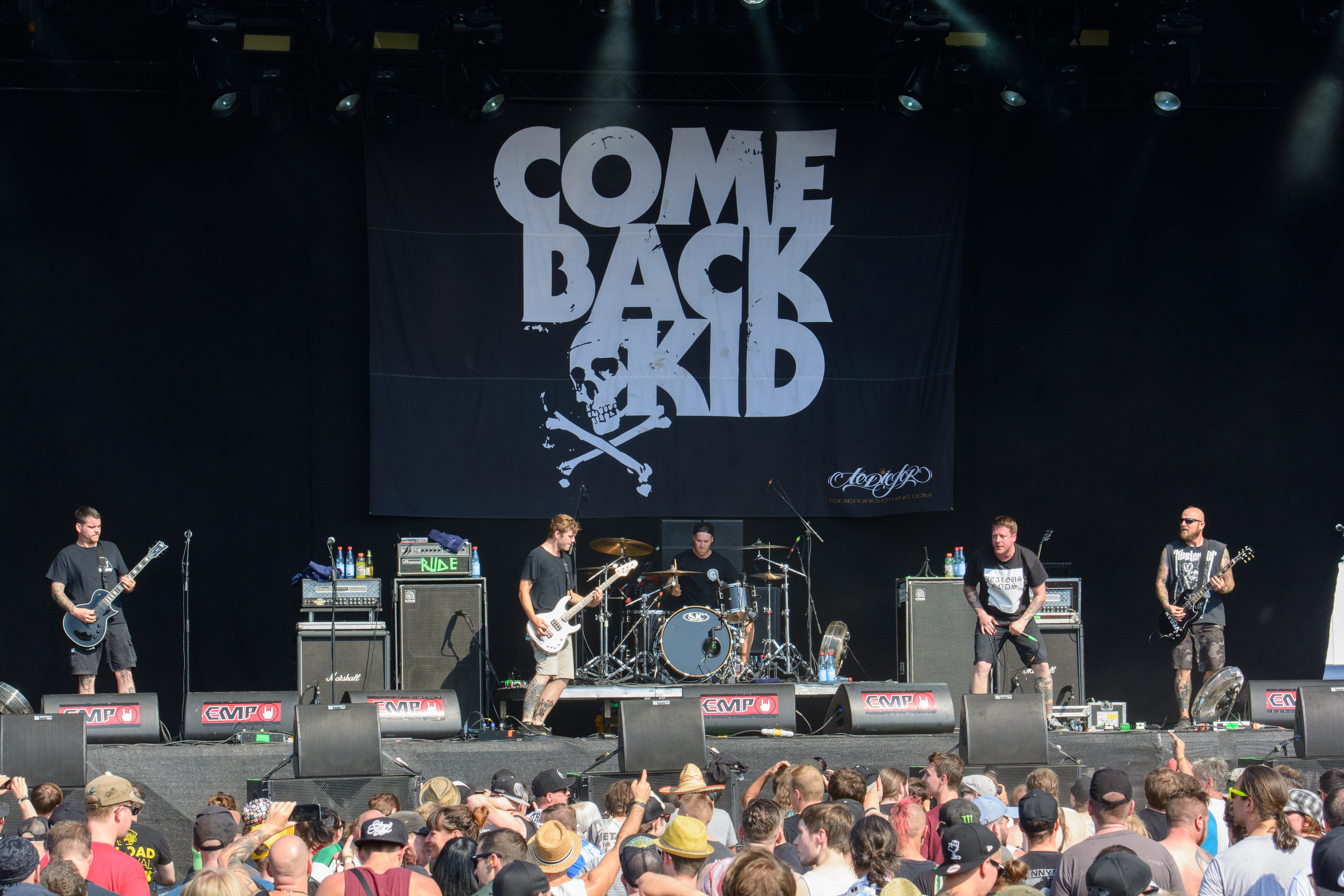
- Comeback Kid live at Reload Festival 2016

Background information
- Origin: Winnipeg, Manitoba, Canada
- Genres: Hardcore punk; melodic hardcore
- Years active: 2001–present
- Labels: Nuclear Blast; Facedown; Victory; Smallman; Distort; New Damage; Cargo; SharpTone
- Members: Andrew Neufeld; Jeremy Hiebert; Stu Ross; Loren Legare; Chase Brenneman
- Past members: Kyle Profeta; Scott Wade; Cliff Heide; Kevin Call; Casey Hjelmberg; Matthew Keil; Jesse Labovitz; Ron Friesen
- Website: www.comeback-kid.com

Comeback Kid is a Canadian hardcore punk band formed in March 2001 in Winnipeg, Manitoba. The band currently consists of vocalist Andrew Neufeld, guitarists Jeremy Hiebert and Stu Ross, bassist Chase Brenneman and drummer Terrance Pettitt. Since its formation, the band has released seven studio albums and seventeen music videos. Their seventh studio album, Heavy Steps, was released in January 2022.

== History ==
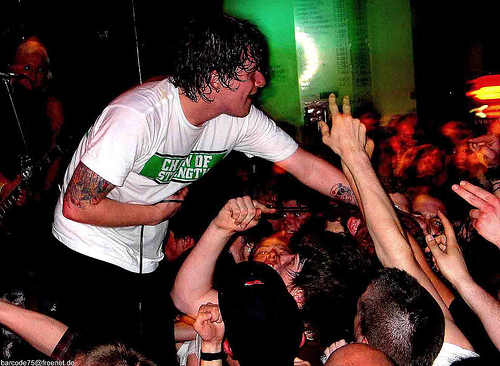
The band live in Münster in 2006

The band was formed in March 2001 by Andrew Neufeld and Jeremy Hiebert, who were members of the band Figure Four, joined by their friends Scott Wade and Kyle Profeta, originally intended only to be a side project. The band's name, originally The Comeback Kid, comes from a headline in a newspaper about hockey player Mario Lemieux coming back to the National Hockey League. The band released a six-song demo in January 2002, and in August 2002, was signed to Facedown Records.

Upon releasing Turn It Around on Facedown Records in 2003, Comeback Kid began touring full-time, covering most of North America as well as Europe. They also appeared on many high-profile hardcore punk festivals like Hellfest and Posi Numbers festival. Following the touring for Turn it Around, Comeback Kid entered the Blasting Room in Fort Collins, Colorado to begin recording their second album.

In February 2005, Comeback Kid released Wake the Dead, their first for Victory Records. After some long tours, vocalist Scott Wade left the band. Neufeld became the band's vocalist, and they began recording their third album, Broadcasting.... The release of Broadcasting... was followed by more steady touring, culminating with a summer long tour supporting Rise Against in North America, and their first appearance on the "Never Say Die" tour in Europe with Parkway Drive. By the end of 2007, the band was to take a short hiatus. At this time, bass player Kevin Call left the band on good terms, issuing a statement regarding leaving Comeback Kid.

Call was replaced with Matt Keil, who had played in Minneapolis-area bands with Hjelmberg. Two more years of touring followed, with the band visiting South East Asia and Latin America for the first time.

In 2008, a CD/DVD was released called Through The Noise, which is a line from the song "Industry Standards" on Broadcasting.... The DVD is a documentary of the first six years of Comeback Kid. The CD is a live recording of a show in Leipzig, Germany, filmed in fall 2007. A release tour in Canada followed, named the "Through the Noise Tour." It featured Bane, Misery Signals, Shai Hulud, Grave Maker, and Outbreak. While on this tour, Gravemaker suffered a van accident with Neufeld in the vehicle, which inspired the song "G.M. Vincent and I" on 2010's Symptoms and Cures.

After two years of international touring, the band spent much of 2010 writing and recording their fourth studio album, Symptoms and Cures, which was released in Canada by Distort Entertainment and internationally by Victory Records. Two more installments of the "Through the Noise" tour followed in North America and Europe.

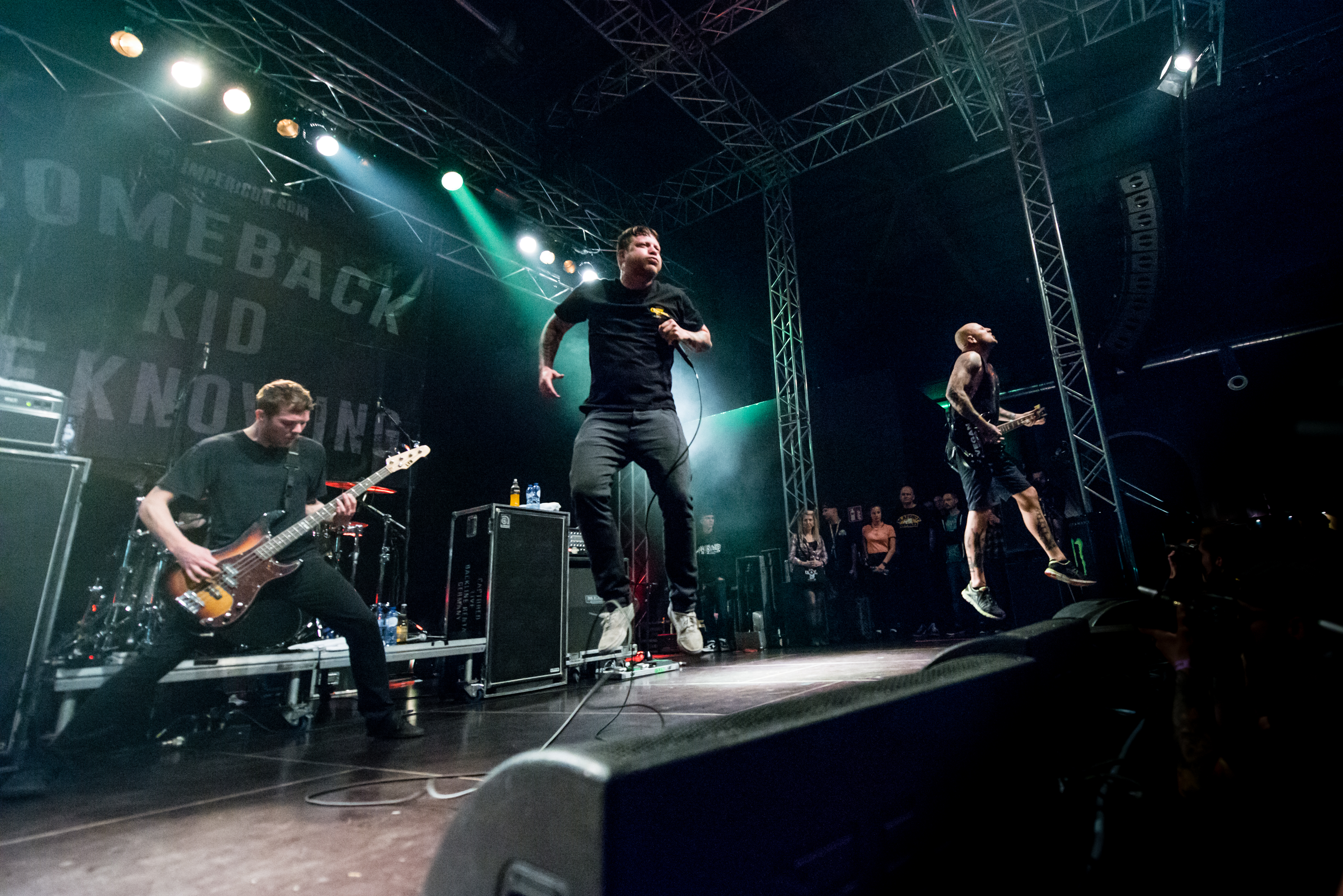
The band at Impericon Festival 2015

In early 2012, guitarist Casey Hjelmberg announced he was leaving the band. Stu Ross of Misery Signals and Living with Lions replaced him.

On September 21, 2013, Comeback Kid stated on their Facebook page that they had started recording a new full-length album. Die Knowing, the band's fifth studio album, was released on March 4, 2014, through Victory Records.

On May 13, 2014, drummer and founding member Kyle Profeta announced his departure from the band, to focus on his culinary skills in South Africa.

On September 8, 2017, Comeback Kid released their sixth studio album, Outsider, via Nuclear Blast.

In April 2019, the band planned to travel Europe with American rock bands Sharptooth, No Turning Back, and Jesus Piece.

Two Comeback Kid songs, "Didn't Even Mind" and "Die Knowing", made a guest appearance in the 2016 novel Devaneio by Brazilian writer Augusto de Brito.

Their seventh studio album, Heavy Steps, was released on January 21, 2022, via New Damage in Canada and Nuclear Blast worldwide.

On March 15, 2024, the band released their new EP, Trouble, via Nuclear Blast’s sister label SharpTone Records.

In early 2025, Comeback Kid announced a US tour for the 20th anniversary of their second album, Wake the Dead, playing the album in full. In April 2025, they announced a Canada tour slated for September 2025.

Former bassist Matt Keil died from ALS in July 2025.

== Band members ==
Current

- Andrew Neufeld – lead vocals (2006–present), rhythm guitar, backing vocals (2001–2006)
- Jeremy Hiebert – lead guitar, backing vocals (2001–present)
- Stu Ross – rhythm guitar, backing vocals (2012–present)
- Loren Legare – drums (2015–present)
- Chase Brenneman – bass, backing vocals (2021–present, touring 2018–2021)

Former

- Cliff Heide – bass (2001–2003)
- Scott Wade – lead vocals (2001–2006)
- Kevin Call – bass (2003–2007)
- Casey Hjelmberg – rhythm guitar (2006–2012)
- Kyle Profeta – drums (2001–2014)
- Matt Keil – bass, backing vocals (2008–2014; died 2025)
- Jesse Labovitz – drums (2014–2015)
- Ron Friesen – bass, backing vocals (2014–2018)

Touring

- Terrance Pettitt - drums (2023)
- Ben Mead - drums (2025)
- Joel Neufeld – drums (sporadically)

Timeline

== Discography ==
=== Studio albums ===
Year	Title	Record label	Chart peaks			
Year	Title	Record label	US 200	US Heat	US Indie	US Hard Rock
2003	Turn It Around	Facedown	—	—	—	—
2005	Wake the Dead	Victory	—	16	27	—
2007	Broadcasting...	Victory	129	3	10	—
2010	Symptoms + Cures	Victory	—	22	—	—
2014	Die Knowing	Victory	161	7	39	15
2017	Outsider	Nuclear Blast	—	—	—	—
2022	Heavy Steps	Nuclear Blast	—	—	—	—
2026	Chosen Hell	SharpTone	—	—	—	—

=== EPs and singles ===
- Demo (2002, self-released)
- "Should Know Better" (2014, Victory)
- "Somewhere, Somehow" (2017, self-released)
- "Absolute" (2017, self-released)
- "Beds Are Burning / Little Soldier" 7" (2018, New Damage)
- "Reality Is A Ride On The Bus" (2020, self-released)
- Trouble 12" (2024, New Damage)
- "Wake The Dead" 7" (2025, New Damage)

=== Live albums ===
- Through The Noise CD/DVD (2008, Smallman/Victory)
- Rain City Sessions +1 10"/12" (2015, Victory)

== Videography ==
- "Die Tonight"
- "Wake The Dead"
- "Broadcasting..."
- "Defeated"
- "False Idols Fall" (live in Leipzig in 2008)
- "Because of All"
- "G.M. Vincent & I"
- "The Concept Stays"
- "Do Yourself a Favor"
- "Should Know Better"
- "Wasted Arrows"
- "Didn't Even Mind"
- "Surrender Control"
- "Hell Of A Scene"
- "No Easy Way Out"
- "Heavy Steps"
- "Crossed" (featuring Joe Duplantier of Gojira)
- "Chosen Hell"
- "Yesterday's Gone (featuring Incendiary)
- Shedding Season (featuring Courtney LaPlante of Spiritbox)
