= About Face Media =

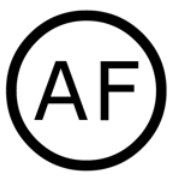
- Company type: Privately Held
- Industry: Media industry
- Founded: 2007
- Headquarters: Milwaukee, WI, U.S.
- Key people: Barry Poltermann, CEO; Denise McKee, COO
- Number of employees: 20
- Website: AboutFaceMedia.com

About Face Media (sometimes referred to as AboutFace) is an American video agency that produces and promotes short-form documentaries within social media on behalf of commercial clients. The company was founded in 2007 as an independently owned new media content marketing agency and later narrowed its focus to documentaries.

== History ==
=== Pre-Founding ===
The original founders of the company (Barry Poltermann, Steve Farr and David Dahlman) had previously co-founded Los Angeles based new media production company L’Orange Entertainment in 2004. L’Orange produced cross-media alternative reality game (ARG) content, primarily video, for the interactive agency 42 Entertainment. Projects included (client in parentheses) Hex 168 (Microsoft Gaming Studios/Xbox 360), MSN Found (Windows Live Search) and Last Call Poker (Activision's GUN), and Dead Man’s Tale, an interactive game for Windows Messenger and Disney's Pirates of the Caribbean.

=== Founding ===
Poltermann, Farr and Dahlman left L’Orange in late 2006. In March 2007 the team was commissioned to produce a web based documentary series to promote the 2007 Art Chicago International Art Fair. They retained documentary filmmaker Dan Ollman (co-director of the 2005 MGM release “The Yes Men (film)”) to direct the series.

About Face was established as an independent company in May 2007.

=== Changes ===
Denise McKee became an advisor to the company in 2007 and officially joined as COO in 2008. McKee previously co-founded San Francisco based LimeLife, a mobile publisher focusing on the women's market.

=== Connection with Independent Film ===
About Face filmmakers have directed, edited or produced several notable feature-length documentaries, including “Mad Hot Ballroom”, “American Movie”, "Gunner Palace", “The Life of Reilly”, "The Art of the Steal (2009 film)" and “Collapse (film)”.

== Projects ==
About Face clients include Sears Holdings, The Trek Bicycle Corporation, 3M, Unilever and Wilson Sporting Goods. Notable projects include the ongoing KmartDesign initiative (launched for Kmart in April 2009) and the 2010 re-election campaign of Illinois Governor Pat Quinn (politician)
