= U-turn (disambiguation) =

A U-turn is a driving maneuver used to reverse direction.

U-turn may also refer to:

== Business and finance ==
- U-turn (banking), a type of international financial transaction
- U-Turn Audio, an American audio equipment manufacturer
- U-Turn GmbH, a German aircraft manufacturer

== Film and television ==
- U-Turn (1973 film), a Canadian film by George Kaczender, starring Maud Adams
- U Turn (1997 film), an American film by Oliver Stone, starring Sean Penn
- U Turn (2016 film), an Indian Kannada-language film
  - U Turn (2018 film), an Indian Telugu/Tamil bilingual remake of the 2016 film
  - U Turn (2019 film), a Sri Lankan remake of the 2016 film
  - U-Turn, a 2020 Filipino remake of the 2016 film featuring Kim Chiu
  - U-Turn (2023 film) an Indian Hindi-language remake of the 2016 film
- U-turn (Weeds), a recurring character on the TV series Weeds
- U-Turn (The Amazing Race), a gameplay feature in the TV reality game show The Amazing Race

== Music ==
- U-Turn (Brian McKnight album) or the title song, 2003
- U-Turn (Isaac Hayes album), 1986
- "U-Turn" (song), by Usher, 2002
- "U-Turn", a song by Scatman John from Everybody Jam!, 1996
- "U-Turn", a song by Tegan and Sara from Love You to Death, 2016
- "U-Turn (Lili)", a song by AaRON, 2007

== Politics ==
- U-turn (politics) or flip-flop, a sudden policy change
- U-Turn (Serbian coalition), a 2011–2013 Serbian political coalition
- Some forms of democratic resilience lead to an autocratizing country making a U-turn back to democracy
