= Norman Cowie =

Norman Cowie.

Norman Cowie is a video artist and potter.

Some of his productions include: Scenes from an endless war, Welcome to New York (2002), Signal to Noise: Life with Television (Co-Director; 1996), The Third Wave, Miss Menu's Interactive World, Poison Ivy (1995), Mr. Rogers Goes Begging the Question!!!, It's a Proud Day for America, About Face (1991), Lying in State (1989), and Nazareth in August (1986).

Ranging from collaborative documentaries to video art, Cowie's work interrogates the relations of power and domination in contemporary society, and seeks to problematize the ways in which meaning and consent are constructed through the media. Cowie's videotapes often use the techniques of documentary, off-air appropriation, and short form sound and text collage.
