= Hazen Camp =

- Emergency shelter
- Location within Nunavut Location within Canada
- Coordinates: 81°49′N 71°20′W
- Country: Canada
- Territory: Nunavut
- Region: Qikiqtaaluk Region

Population
  - Total: 0
- Time zone: UTC-5 (EST)
  - Summer (DST): UTC-4 (EDT)

Hazen Camp is a shelter maintained and operated by Parks Canada. It contains many all-weather shelters for the park staff. The visiting researchers set up tents in the camp area.

== History ==
Hazen Camp was originally established in 1957–1958 for Operation Hazen. It was one of the most comprehensive science research projects ever in the Canadian High Arctic. Today, Hazen Camp is used as a Warden Station and an access point to Quttinirpaaq National Park.

== Geography ==
Hazen Camp is situated halfway along the north shore of Lake Hazen. The closest inhabited place is Alert, the research station and CFS Alert, about 155 km (96 mi) northeast. The closest public settlement is Grise Fiord, over 650 km (400 mi) south southwest. McGill Mountain (81°59′N 71°35′W) is very close to the station, about 19 km (12 mi) north northwest, rising 1,073 m (3,520 ft).
