= Fort Conger =

Former settlement in Nunavut, Canada

- Grinnell Land, Ellesmere Island, Canadian Arctic
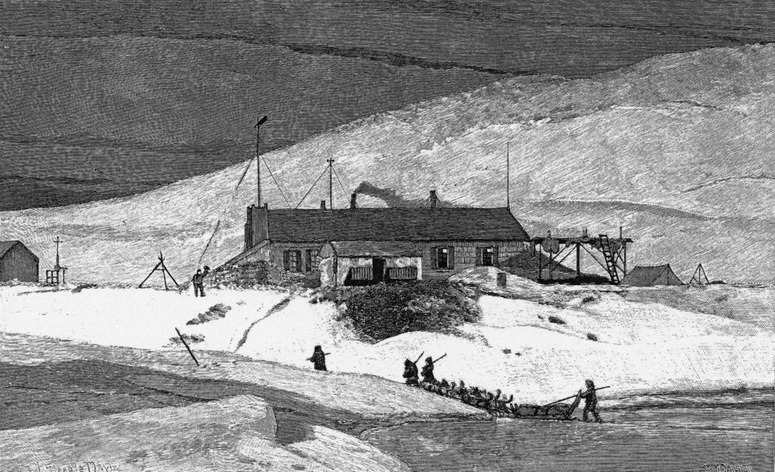
- Fort Conger in May 1883

Site information
- Type: Scientific research post
- Operator: United States Army Signal Corps

Location
- Coordinates: 81°45′N 64°45′W

Site history
- Built: August 1881 (144 years ago)
- In use: 1881–1935
- Materials: Wooden boards; tar paper
- Events: Lady Franklin Bay Expedition

Fort Conger is a former settlement, military fortification, and scientific research post in the Qikiqtaaluk Region, Nunavut, Canada. It was established in 1881 as an Arctic exploration camp, notable as the site of the first major northern polar region scientific expedition, the Lady Franklin Bay Expedition, led by Adolphus Greely as part of the United States government's contribution to the First International Polar Year. It was later occupied by Robert Peary during some of his Arctic expeditions.

Fort Conger is located on the northern shore of Lady Franklin Bay in Grinnell Land, northeastern Ellesmere Island within Quttinirpaaq National Park. Bellot Island lies across from Fort Conger within Discovery Harbour. Though lacking in timber, the area is characterized by grasses and sedges. The surroundings are rugged and boast high cliffs around the harbour. Now uninhabited, it is one of only a handful of previously staffed stations in the Queen Elizabeth Islands. In 1991, some of the structures at Fort Conger were designated as Classified Federal Heritage Buildings.

== History ==
Before Fort Conger was established, its Discovery Harbour was used as a wintering site by the crew of HMS Discovery, led by George Nares, during the British Arctic Expedition of 1875. Though Nares left behind provisions at Fort Conger, most of those supplies were unfound when Fort Conger was established as a research base in 1881 during the Lady Franklin Bay Expedition, led by U.S. Army First Lieutenant Adolphus Greely. The fort was named by Greely after U.S. Senator Omar D. Conger, who had supported the expedition. Twenty-five men, including officers, enlisted, and Inuit, lived and conducted research at Fort Conger over the next two years. (Greely would rise to the rank of major general in the Army and received the Medal of Honor for his lifetime achievements in 1935.)

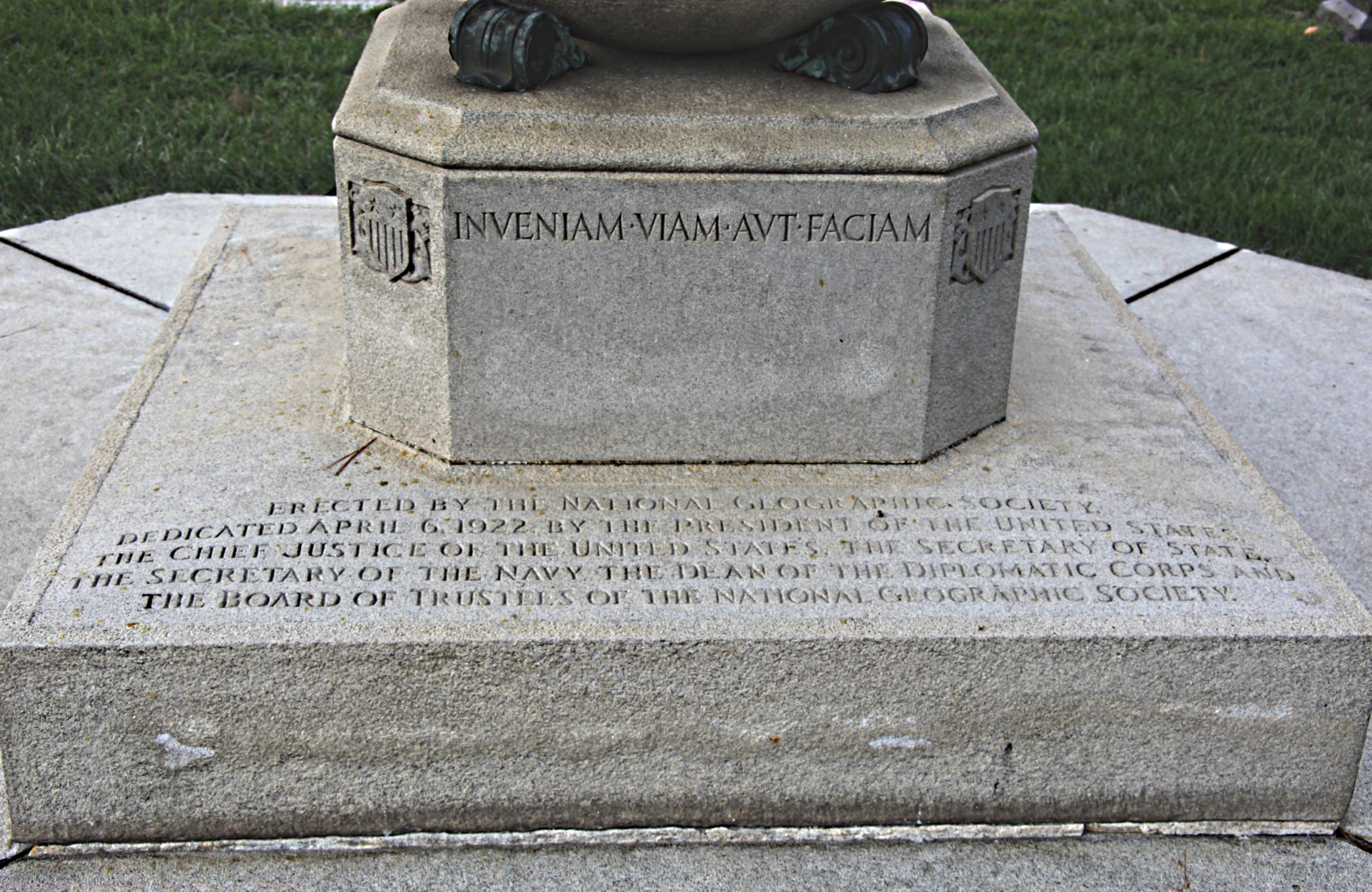
Peary's grave at Arlington National Cemetery

During his 1899 expedition to reach the geographic North Pole, Robert Peary reached Fort Conger, only to have several toes snap off at the first joint because of frostbite. Bedridden for weeks while recuperating, Peary wrote on a wall, Inveniam viam aut faciam ("I shall find a way or make one."), the words Hannibal had allegedly said before crossing the Alps. Later they became an inscription on the monument over Peary's grave at Arlington National Cemetery.

Two additional Peary expedition parties returned to Fort Conger in 1905 and 1908. Other explorers used Fort Conger as a base from 1915 through 1935. In 1937, the MacGregor Arctic Expedition attempted to reoccupy Fort Conger.

== Construction ==
The original fort was built as a three-room building, 18 m (59 ft) long, 5 m (16 ft) wide, and 3 m (9.8 ft) high. Lean-tos on either side of the building housed supplies. The double-wall construction of the main building consisted of long, wooden boards, covered with tar paper. This type of construction was found to be unsuitable for the Arctic as it was difficult to keep the building warm.

Peary found Fort Conger to be "grotesque in its utter unfitness and unsuitableness for polar winter quarters" and eventually tore down the original building. Re-using the wood, he built several smaller, adjoining buildings, some of which still stand and are classified as Federal Heritage Buildings.

== Research ==
As a scientific station, Fort Conger has been the site of many research projects from the early "Pendulum Observations", to "Research on the microbes attacking the historic woods at Fort Conger and the Peary huts on Ellesmere Island" conducted by the University of Minnesota. Unexpected large quantities of arsenic have been discovered at Fort Conger in recent years, its presence most likely attributable to it being delivered there for sample preservation. In 2013, a comprehensive 17-page report on the history of Fort Conger was published in the journal, Arctic.

== In popular culture ==
In the 1974 Disney film The Island at the Top of the World, Fort Conger is featured as a stopover station for airborne arctic explorers in the year 1907.

== See also ==
- Northernmost settlements
