= Lake Hazen =

Lake on Ellesmere Island, Nunavut, Canada

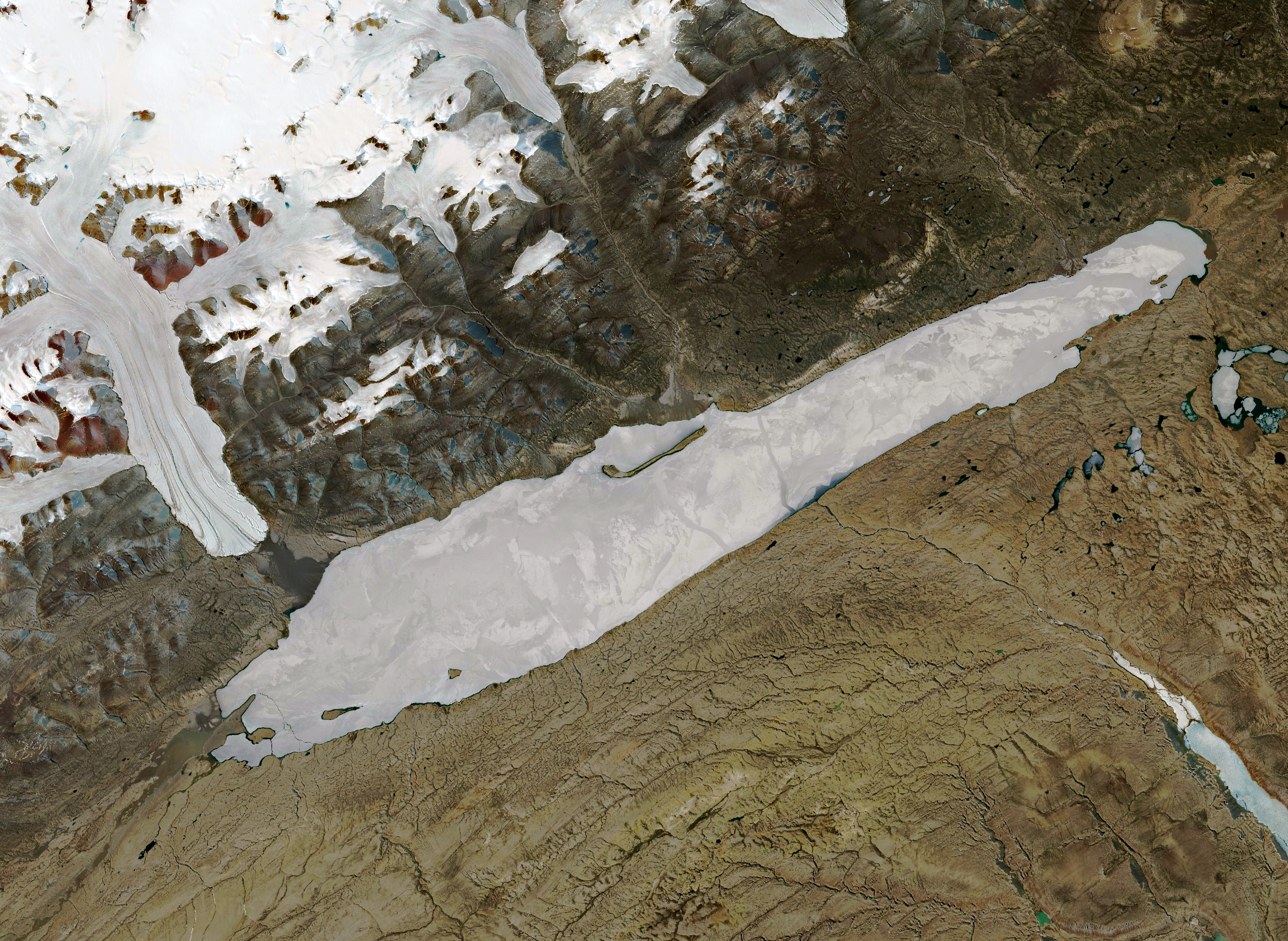
- Sentinel-2 image (2022)

- Location within Canada Location within Nunavut
- Location: 118 km (73 mi) southwest of Alert, Nunavut
- Coordinates: 81°48′N 71°00′W
- Primary inflows: Glaciers of the Eureka Uplands: Henrietta Nesmith Glacier; Gilmour Glaciers
- Primary outflows: Ruggles River
- Catchment area: 4,900 km^{2} (1,900 sq mi)
- Basin countries: Canada
- Max. length: 74 km (46 mi)
- Max. width: 12 km (7 mi)
- Surface area: 537.5 km^{2} (207.5 sq mi)
- Max. depth: 267 m (876 ft)
- Water volume: 51.4×10^{9} m^{3} (41.7×10^{6} acre⋅ft)
- Shore length^{1}: 185 km (115 mi)
- Surface elevation: 158 m (518 ft)
- Islands: St. John's Island
- Settlements: Hazen Camp
- ^{1} Shore length is not a well-defined measure.

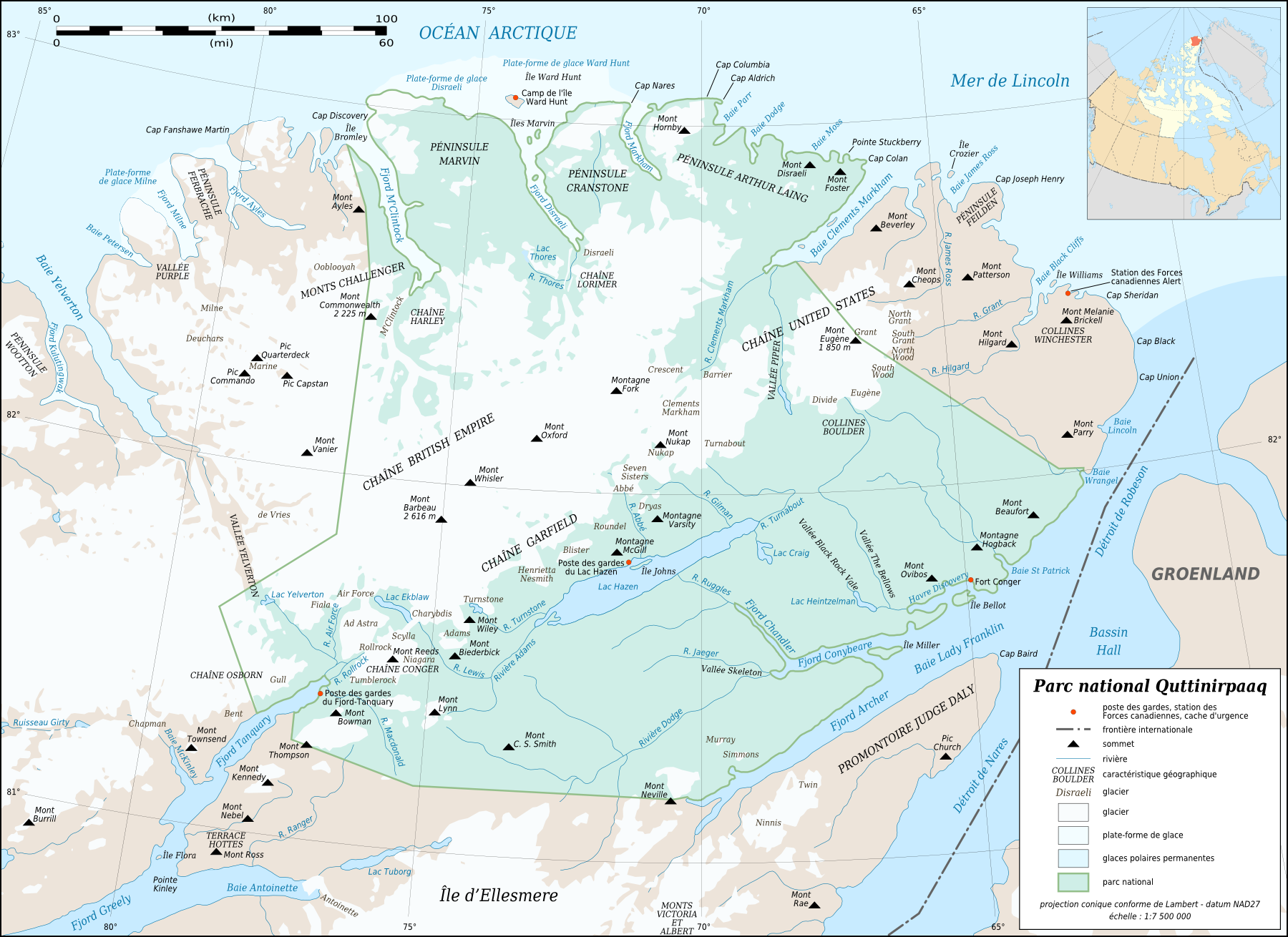
Lake Hazen within Quttinirpaaq National Park

Lake Hazen is a freshwater lake in the northern part of Ellesmere Island, Nunavut, Canada, north of the Arctic Circle. It is the largest lake north of the Arctic Circle by volume. By surface area it is third largest, after Lake Taymyr in Russia and Lake Inari in Finland.

The area around the lake is a thermal oasis within a polar desert, with summer temperatures up to 20 °C (68 °F). The lake itself is covered by ice about ten months a year. It is fed by glaciers (most importantly Henrietta Nesmith and the Gilmour Glaciers) from the surrounding Eureka Uplands—Palaeozoic rocks north of the lake, rising up to 2,500 m (8,200 ft) above sea level—and drained by the 15 km-long (9.3 mi) Ruggles River, which flows into Chandler Fjord on the northern east coast of Ellesmere Land. The lake is flanked by the Arctic Cordillera.

The lake is 74 km (46 mi) long and up to 12 km (7 mi) wide, with an area of 537.5 km^{2} (207.5 sq mi). It stretches in a southwest–northeast direction from 81°40′N 72°58′W to 81°56′N 68°55′W. The lake is up to 269 m (883 ft) deep and has an estimated volume of 51.4 km^{3}. The shoreline is 185 km (115 mi) long and 158 m (518 ft) above sea level. The lake has several islands, the largest of them being Johns Island, which is 7 km (4.3 mi) long and less than 1 km (0.62 mi) wide, also extending in a southwest–northeast direction like the lake itself. Other islands include Gatter Island, Clay Island (both close to the northeastern shore), Whisler Island, and Dyas Island (both close to the southern shore).

Lake Hazen is often called the northernmost lake of Canada, but detailed maps show several smaller lakes up to more than 100 km (62 mi) farther north. Turnabout Lake is immediately northeast of the northern end of Lake Hazen. Still further north are the Upper and Lower Dumbell Lakes, with Upper Dumbell Lake 5.2 km (3 mi) southwest of Alert, Canada's northernmost settlement on the coast of the Lincoln Sea, part of the Arctic Ocean.

The northeastern end of Lake Hazen is 118 km (73 mi) southwest of Alert.

The lake is part of Quttinirpaaq National Park.

Artifacts of the Thule civilization were discovered near Lake Hazen in 2004. These included ruins of a stone dwelling near the Ruggles River and discarded fish bones, suggesting an overwintering fishing camp where the strong current resisted freezing over. The Thule were ancestors of the Inuit. In 1882, Adolphus Greely was the first European to discover the lake during his 1881–1883 expedition. He named the lake in honour of General William Babcock Hazen, who had organized the expedition. Camp Hazen was established on the northern shore of the lake in 1957 as part of Operation Hazen during the International Geophysical Year (IGY), and has been used by various scientific parties since then.

Lake Hazen is populated by two morphotypes of Arctic char, a larger and a smaller. Studies in the 1990s indicated neither char morphotype is anadromous, but Inuit traditional knowledge states otherwise.

== Named inflows ==
All named rivers and creeks are listed in a clockwise manner, starting in the south:

At the southwestern end (from south to north):

- Very River
- Adams River

On the northwest coast (from southwest to northeast):

- Turnstone River
- Henrietta River
- Ptarmigan Creek
- Blister Creek
- Skeleton Creek
- Snow Goose River
- Abbé River
- Cuesta Creek
- Mesa Creek
- Gilman River

At the northeast end (from north to south):

- Turnabout River
- Salor Creek

On the southeast coast (only in the southwest, near the southwest end of the lake):

- Cobb River
- Traverse River

== Tourism ==
Hikers can start their hiking trips at Lake Hazen itself, or from Tanquary Fiord warden station at Tanquary Fiord Airport 70 km (43 mi) southwest of the lake.

== In popular culture ==
Lake Hazen is the setting of a major story plot in the novel Good Morning, Midnight, published 2016. A film adaptation of that book was released in 2020 under the title The Midnight Sky, although the actual filming was done in Iceland.
