= Turnaround =

Turnaround may refer to:

- Turnaround (filmmaking), an arrangement in which the rights to a project are sold by one studio to another
- Turnaround (refining), an event wherein an entire process unit is taken offstream for revamp or renewal
- Turnaround (road), a type of traffic junction
- Turnaround management, a management strategy to regenerate a company's performance
- Turnaround, in scheduling, the total time between submission of a process and its completion
- Turnaround, the process of or time needed for loading, unloading, and servicing an aircraft, see aircraft ground handling

== Books, films, sculpture ==
- Turnaround: Crisis, Leadership, and the Olympic Games, a 2004 book by Mitt Romney
- Turnaround: How America's Top Cop Reversed the Crime Epidemic, a 1998 memoir by William Bratton
- Turnaround, a 1987 film by Ola Solum

== Music ==
- Turnaround (music), in jazz or blues, a transitional passage at the end of a section

=== Albums ===
- Turnaround (Stan Rogers album), 1978
- Turnaround (Joanne Brackeen album), 1992
- Turnaround (Westlife album), 2003
  - Turnaround Tour, a 2004 tour by Westlife in support of the album
- The Turnaround!, a 1965 album by Hank Mobley
- Turnaround, an album by Katrina and the Waves

=== Songs ===
- "Turnaround", a Nirvana cover of the song "Turn Around" by Devo, a B-side from the single "Whip It", featured on Incesticide
- "Turnaround", a song by Ornette Coleman from Tomorrow Is the Question!
- "Turnaround", a song by Kisschasy from Seizures
- "Turnaround", a song by Stan Rogers from the title of the 1978 album

== See also ==
- Turn Around (disambiguation)
