= Lady Franklin Bay =

Bay in Nunavut, Canada

- Location within Nunavut
- Location: Nares Strait
- Coordinates: 81°35′N 65°00′W
- Ocean/sea sources: Arctic Ocean
- Basin countries: Canada
- Max. length: 40 km (25 mi)
- Max. width: 16 km (9.9 mi)
- Settlements: Fort Conger (uninhabited)

Lady Franklin Bay is an Arctic waterway in the Qikiqtaaluk Region, Nunavut, Canada. The bay is located in Nares Strait, northwest of Judge Daly Promontory and is an inlet into the northeastern shore of Ellesmere Island.

Fort Conger—formerly an Arctic exploration camp—is located on its northern shore.

== Geography ==
Lady Franklin Bay divides Grant Land to the north from Grinnell Land to the south.

Lady Franklin Bay is in a generally northeast to southwest direction, and as such it spreads inland about 110 km (70 mi) from Hall Basin. The main bay contains one noted branch to the northwest known as Discovery Bay, and the interior lengths of Lady Franklin Bay extending southwest are sometimes shown on maps as Archer Fjord.

The landscape surrounding Lady Franklin Bay is generally barren rocks, with some very shallow glacial till held in place with frost and permafrost. At this location, about 1,800 km (1,100 mi) above the Arctic Circle, sunlight is limited to perhaps three months of a year, snowfall is light, and water in the bay is icebound from year to year, with just chance openings allowing only difficult navigation. The off-and-on icebound conditions are well known to exist in the sea during peak summer times as far as 320 km (200 mi) south of the Bay entrance. However, the glaciers and icecaps of Ellesmere Island have not been known to inundate Lady Franklin Bay.

The main reach of this bay can be approached by ship if ice floe conditions allow, via Baffin Bay, to Smith Sound, to Kane Basin, through Kennedy Channel, and thus through Hall Basin to the entrance of the Bay. The historically favoured point for beginning such Polar trips has been St. John's.

The climate is a typical Arctic climate, with very light precipitation, short cold summers, and long cold winters in darkness. The summer natural food game observed at this Bay is limited to various mammals in the sea water, occasional muskox, and scattered sea birds seen overhead. Plants are limited to short season mosses and lichens.

== History ==
Lady Franklin Bay is named for Lady Jane Franklin, wife of famous British explorer Sir John Franklin, who vanished from Baffin Bay beyond Lancaster Sound on HMS Erebus in 1845 while attempting to trace the Northwest Passage. Sir John was lost within the Queen Elizabeth Islands south of Ellesmere Island. Erebus and Terror were later found off the coast of King William Island, about 1,000 km (620 mi) south of the Queen Elizabeth Islands, in what is now known as HMS Erebus and HMS Terror National Historic Site Lady Franklin subsequently became internationally well known by financing several different rescue expeditions to search for Sir John.

Lady Franklin Bay reached press headlines in the United States in the period 1880–1884 after the United States Army Signal Corps chose and specified that site for a base camp for the Lady Franklin Bay Expedition. In August 1881, a party of 25 military men led by First Lieutenant Adolphus Greely, as acting signal officer was successfully landed by the USS Proteus at Lady Franklin Bay to establish a meteorological-observation station as part of the First International Polar Year. A large frame structure was built on the northwest shore, and this home base camp was named Fort Conger.
