= Tanquary Fiord =

Fjord on Ellesmere Island, Nunavut, Canada

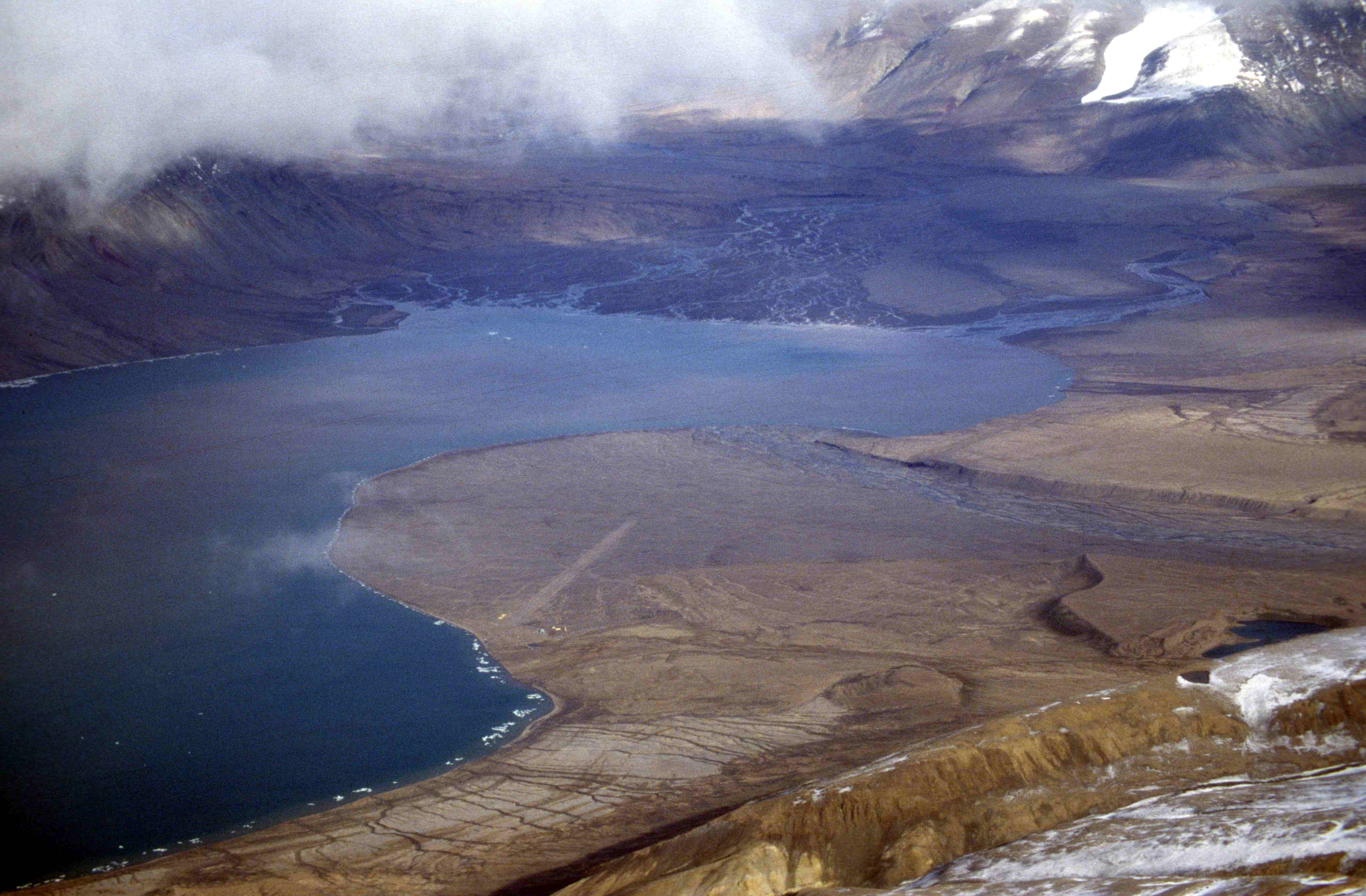
- The north-east part of Tanquary Fiord with Tanquary Fiord Airport on the right

- Location
- Location: Ellesmere Island, Nunavut
- Coordinates: 81°05′N 78°45′W
- Ocean/sea sources: Nansen Sound via Greely Fiord
- Basin countries: Canada

Tanquary Fiord is a fjord on the north coast of the Arctic Archipelago's Ellesmere Island, Nunavut, Canada. It is located in the Quttinirpaaq National Park and extends 48 km (30 mi) in a north-westerly direction from Greely Fiord.

== History ==
Radiocarbon dating methods suggest that between 10,000 and 4,100 BP, deglaciation occurred, followed by a period of glacial readvance and the formation of ice shelves until 2,400 BP. Until 1,400 BP, a period of glacial retreat occurred, and since then glacial readvance and nearby ice rises have marked the area.

Radiocarbon analysis of charcoal undertaken by the Geological Survey of Canada has shown that Inuit were present at Tanquary Fiord around 1070 BP at the latest.

== Geography ==
The head of the Tanquary Fiord is the convergence point of four river valleys, three of which end in a floodplain and one in a river delta. Carbon dating findings show that the fjord was free of glacial ice approximately 6,500 years ago. In the past 40 years, the terminal points of side glaciers have receded.

Tanquary Fiord has 65 frost-free days per year (enough to grow lettuce), which is remarkable for its latitude. Summer temperatures of 18 °C (64 °F) have been recorded.

== Human activity ==
In 1963, the Defence Research Board began 'Operation Tanquary' in the area, with a focus on oceanography. The operation concluded in 1972. As the fjord is in a remote location, there is little human habitation. A Warden Station is staffed by Parks Canada during the summer months, and Tanquary Fiord Airport is located nearby. It is possible to reach the area via charter aircraft, or increasingly via icebreaker cruise ships. In 1947, a meteorological station was installed at Eureka, about 175 km (109 mi) southwest of the fiord. The Fiord was named by Explorer Donald Baxter MacMillan in honor of his friend and fellow explorer Maurice Cole Tanquary. See also the Crocker Land Expedition.
