= Turn It Around (Comeback Kid album) =

Studio album by Comeback Kid
- Released: March 4, 2003
- Recorded: November 2002
- Genre: Hardcore punk, melodic hardcore
- Length: 28:12
- Label: Facedown

Comeback Kid chronology
Demo (2002)	Turn It Around (2003)	Wake the Dead (2005)

Professional ratings
Review scores
Source	Rating
Punknews	5/5 stars

Turn It Around is the debut studio album by hardcore punk band Comeback Kid. It was released on March 4, 2003, on the independent label Facedown Records. It was also released on vinyl by Give Me Strength.

== Track listing ==
No.	Title	Length
1.	"All in a Year"	2:09
2.	"Give and Take"	1:40
3.	"Die Tonight"	2:55
4.	"Changing Face"	2:20
5.	"Playing the Part"	1:41
6.	"Always"	1:37
7.	"Step Ahead"	1:39
8.	"Operative Word"	2:14
9.	"Biting Tongue"	1:07
10.	"Something Less"	1:57
11.	"Never Fade"	2:11
12.	"Without a Word"	1:15
13.	"Lorelei"	5:27
Total length:		28:12

== Credits ==
- Scott Wade – lead vocals
- Jeremy Hiebert – lead guitar, backing vocals
- Andrew Neufield – rhythm guitar, backing vocals
- Cliff Heide – bass
- Kyle Profeta – drums
- Jon Bain (One of These Days) – guest vocals on "Always"
