= Quttinirpaaq National Park =

National park in Nunavut, Canada

- Parc national Quttinirpaaq
- IUCN category II (national park)
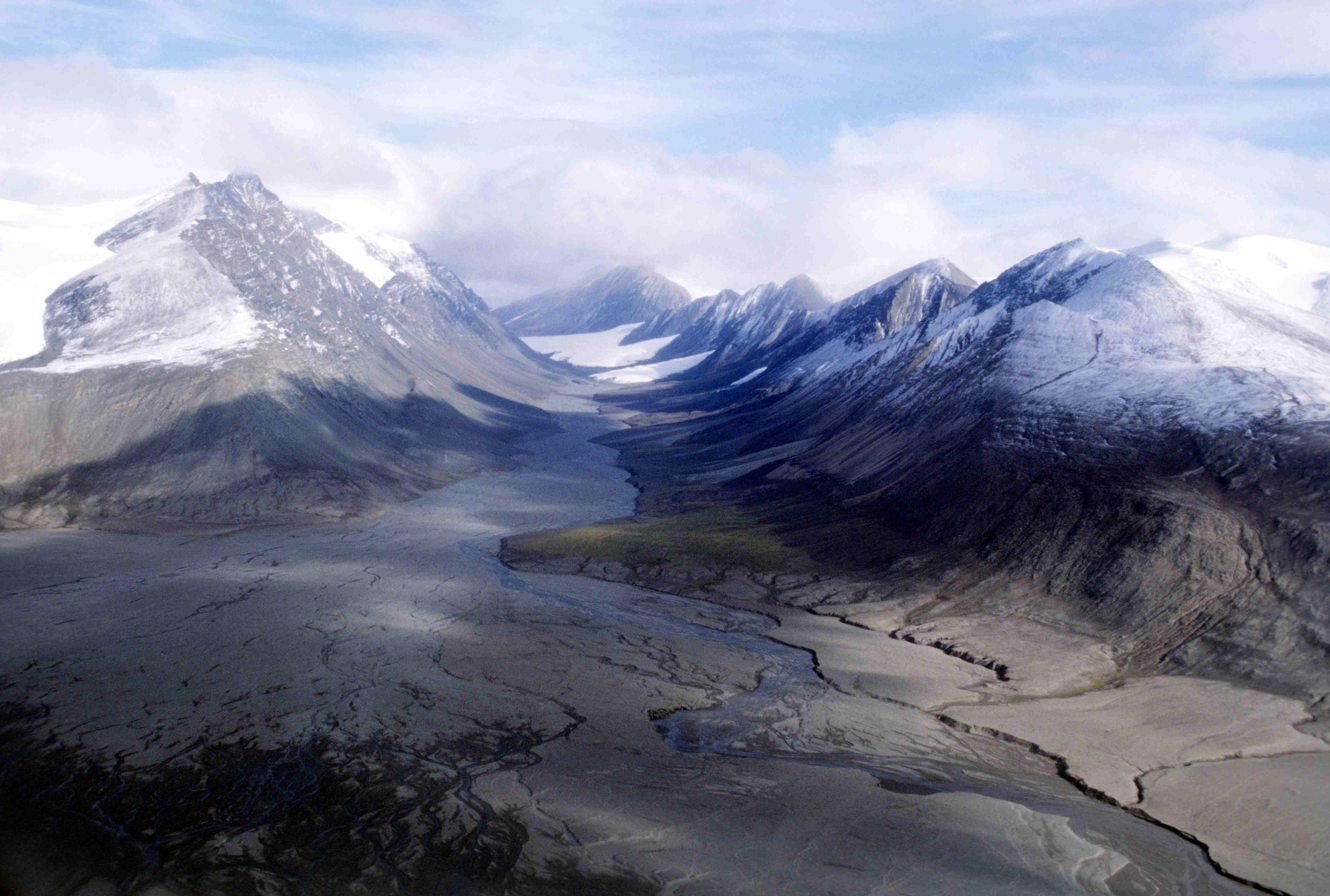
- Aerial view of Quttinirpaaq National Park, 1997

- Location within Canada Location within Nunavut
- Interactive map of Quttinirpaaq National Park
- Location: Nunavut, Canada
- Nearest town: Alert
- Coordinates: 82°13′N 072°13′W
- Area: 37,775 km^{2} (14,585 sq mi)
- Max. elevation: Barbeau Peak; 2,616 m (8,583 ft)
- Established: 1988
- Visitors: 7 (in 2022–23)
- Governing body: Parks Canada
- Website: Quttinirpaaq National Park

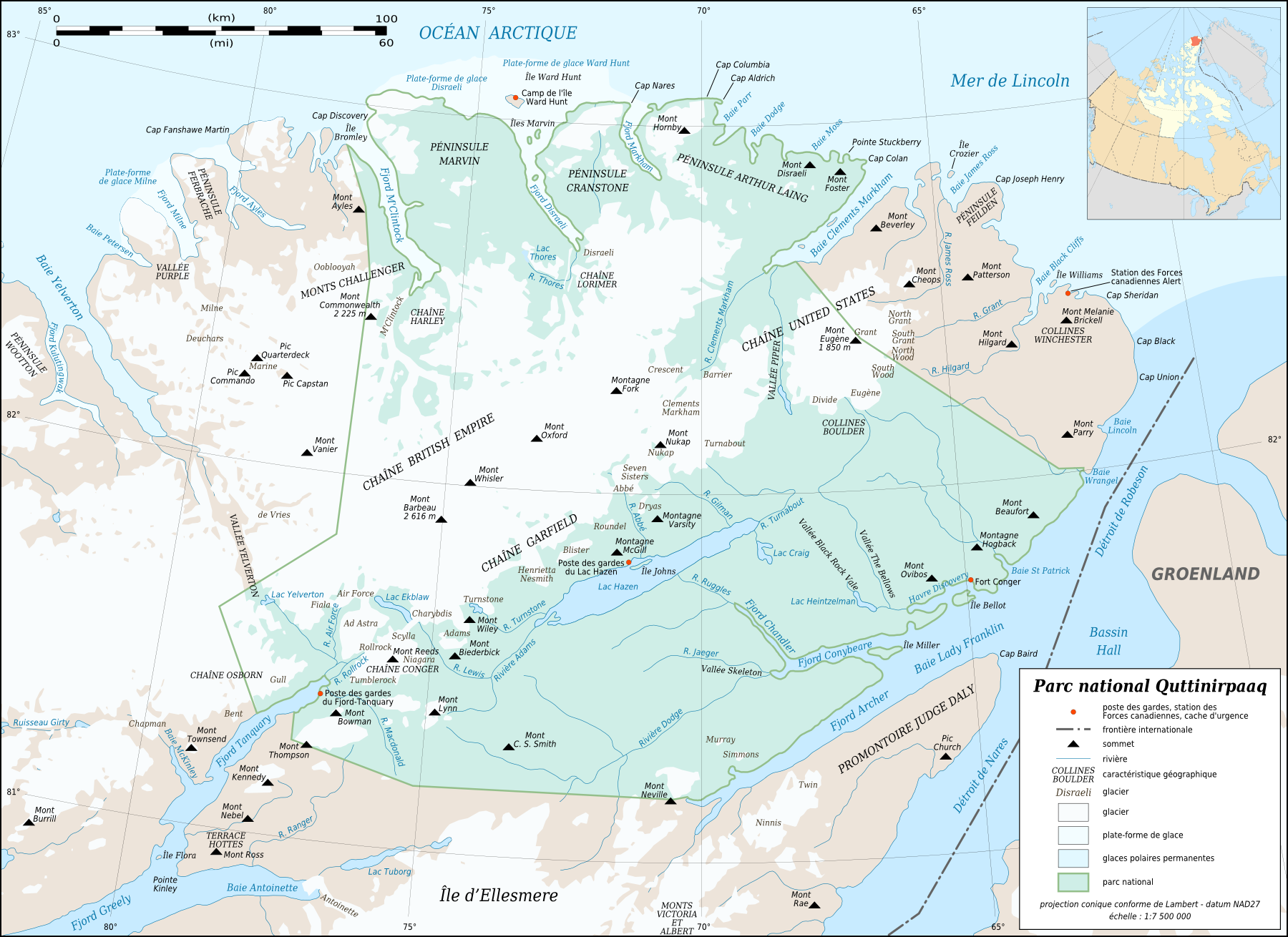
Map of Quttinirpaaq National Park

Quttinirpaaq National Park is located on the northeastern corner of Ellesmere Island in the Qikiqtaaluk Region of Nunavut, Canada. It is the second most northerly park on Earth after Northeast Greenland National Park. In Inuktitut, Quttinirpaaq means "top of the world". It was established as Ellesmere Island National Park Reserve in 1988, and the name was changed to Quttinirpaaq in 1999, when Nunavut was created, and became a national park in 2000. The reserve covers 37,775 km^{2} (14,585 sq mi), making it the second largest park in Canada, after Wood Buffalo National Park.

The park is remarkable for its extensive glaciers and ice caps, desert-like conditions, and life forms that are uniquely adapted to the extreme polar environment. Only about 50 people visit the park each year.

== Landscape and weather ==
The land is dominated by rock and ice. It is a polar desert with very little annual precipitation.

Much of the highlands of the park are covered in ice caps. These ice caps, and the glaciers that descend from them, date back at least to the last episode of glaciation.

The park includes Barbeau Peak, part of the Arctic Cordillera, which at 2,616 m (8,583 ft) is the highest mountain in Nunavut.

The park, located in the high arctic, sees 24 hours of daylight ("midnight sun") from May to August, and 24 hours of darkness (polar night) from November to February. Winters in the national park are very cold and are known for having some of Canada's lowest recorded temperatures. Summers are short and often feature cool temperatures and winter-like conditions, though the Lake Hazen region is known for having warmer temperatures.

== Wildlife ==
Some wildlife, notably Arctic hares, lemmings, muskoxen and Arctic wolves reside in this national park, but sparse vegetation and low temperatures support only small populations. There is a very small Peary caribou population as well. Other animal inhabitants include ringed seals, bearded seals, walruses, polar bears, and narwhals. During summer months, birds nest in the park including semipalmated plovers, red knots, gyrfalcons and long-tailed jaegers. Common plants include dwarf willow, arctic willow, and Arctic cotton, in addition to grasses and lichens. Plant and animal life is more concentrated in the Lake Hazen region, given its milder climate compared to the surrounding ice cap-covered mountains and valleys.

== Human history ==
Due to its high latitude and limited wildlife, there has never been any significant human presence within this part of Ellesmere Island. The pass from Tanquary Fiord through to Lake Hazen shows evidence of being used by Arctic people since about 5000 years ago. Tent rings and food caches show that the area was visited by pre-Dorset, Dorset and Thule people, the ancestors of modern Inuit.

The east and north end of the island was used as a starting point for various polar explorations. Fort Conger was an early Arctic exploration research base, and is now maintained as a Federal Heritage Building.

== Park ==
Parks Canada maintains warden stations and gravel air strips at Tanquary Fiord Airport, Lake Hazen and Ward Hunt Island. The air strips at Tanquary Fiord and Lake Hazen are the main access points for tourists. Beyond these warden stations, there are no facilities within the park itself. Two backpacking routes are the route between Lake Hazen and Tanquary Fiord, and a loop around the Ad Astra and Viking ice caps, both approximately 100 km (62 mi).

In 2004, the park was one of nine sites added to Canada's tentative list of potential World Heritage Sites.

The park was honoured on a postage stamp issued by Canada Post on January 14, 2019. It was a first-class rate stamp, issued at a value of 90 cents, and part of a nine-stamp definitive (regular) set issued the same day, in a series which debuted in 2018.

== See also ==
- List of protected areas of Nunavut
