= Pery =

Pery may refer to:

== People ==
=== Associated with the Earldom of Limerick ===
- William Pery, 1st Baron Glentworth (1721–1794), Anglican Bishop of Limerick, Ardfert and Aghadoe
- Edmund Pery, 1st Earl of Limerick, politician, fervent unionist
- William Pery, 3rd Earl of Limerick (1840–1896), Irish peer
- William Pery, 4th Earl of Limerick (1863–1929), Irish peer, British army soldier
- Edmond Pery, 5th Earl of Limerick (1888–1967), British peer and soldier
- Patrick Pery, 6th Earl of Limerick (1930–2003), Irish peer and public servant
- Edmund Pery, 7th Earl of Limerick (born 1963)

=== Other people ===
- Angela Pery, Countess of Limerick, (1897–1981), leader of the International British Red Cross movements
- Edward Pery Buckley (1796–1873), British Liberal and Whig politician
- Nicole Péry (born 1943), French socialist politician
- Pascual Pery (1911–1989), Spanish admiral
- Pery Burge (1955–2013), English artist
- Pery Igel (1921–1998), Brazilian businessman
- Pery Ribeiro (1937-2012), Brazilian singer, songwriter

== Other ==
- Péry, a former municipality in the Bernese Jura of Switzerland
- An abbreviation or reporting mark for Pacific Electric railway.

== See also ==
- Pari (disambiguation)
- Peary (disambiguation)
- John Perie
- Peri (disambiguation)
- Perri, a surname
- Perrie
- Perry (disambiguation)
