= Perry (given name) =

- Pronunciation: /ˈpɛri/
- Gender: Unisex
- Language: English

Origin
- Origin: From the Latin language, related to Peregrine, meaning "traveler" or "pilgrim"
- Region of origin: English language

Other names
- Variant forms: Perrey, Perrie, Perri
- Related names: Perry (surname), Parry, Peregrine, Perdita
- Popularity: see popular names

Perry is a unisex given name.

== Male ==
=== A–G ===
- Perry Adair (1899–1953), American golfer
- Perry Adkisson (1929–2020), entomologist and Chancellor of the Texas A&M University System
- Perry Anderson (born 1938), British historian and political essayist
- Perry Anderson (ice hockey) (born 1961), Canadian hockey player
- Perry Anzilotti (born 1959), American actor
- Perry A. Armstrong (1823–1904), American politician
- Perry Baker (born 1986), American rugby sevens player
- Perry Bamonte (1960–2025), English guitarist and bassist best known for his work with The Cure
- Perry Richardson Bass (1914–2006), American heir, investor and philanthropist
- Perry Bellegarde (born 1962), Canadian First Nations and Métis activist and politician
- Perry Benson (born 1961), English actor
- Perry Berezan (born 1964), Canadian hockey player
- Perry Bhandal (born 1968), British director and screenwriter
- Perry Blake (born 1970), Irish singer and songwriter
- Perry Bradford (1893–1970), African-American composer and vaudeville performer
- Perry Brass (born 1947), American author, journalist, playwright, essayist, and gay activist
- Perry Bräutigam (born 1963), German soccer player and coach
- Perry Broad (1921–1993), Nazi SS member at Auschwitz
- Perry E. Brocchus (1810–1880), justice of the Supreme Court of the Utah Territory
- Perry Bullard (1942–1998), American politician
- Perry Caravello (born 1963), aspiring actor
- Perry Carter (born 1971), American football player and coach
- Perry Chen (born 1976), American artist and the creator of Kickstarter
- Perry Christie (born 1943), Bahamian politician and Prime Minister of the Bahamas
- Perry Cohea (died 1848), American pioneer
- Perry Collins (1813–1900), entrepreneur best known for the Russian-American Telegraph
- Perry Como (1912–2001), American singer and television presenter
- Perry R. Cook (born 1955), American computer music researcher and head of the Princeton Sound Lab
- Perry Cotton (born 1965), footballer
- Perry Criscitelli (born 1950), American restaurant owner and alleged member of the Bonanno crime family
- Perry Crosswhite (born 1947), Australian Olympic basketball player and administrator
- Perry Currin (1928–2011), American baseball player
- Perry Daneshgari (fl. 1980s–2020s), Iranian-American entrepreneur
- Perry DeAngelis (1963–2007), American podcaster
- Perry Digweed (born 1959), English footballer
- Perry Lee Dunn (1941–2018), American football player
- Perry B. Duryea (state senator) (1891–1968), American politician
- Perry B. Duryea Jr. (1921–2004), American politician
- Perry Rand Dyck (born 1943), Canadian author and professor
- Perry T. Egbert (1893–1970), American engineer and president of the American Locomotive Company
- Perry Ellis (1940–1986), American fashion designer
- Perry Ellis (basketball) (born 1993), American basketball player
- Perry Farrell (born 1959), American musician, known as the frontman of Jane's Addiction and for creating the festival Lollapalooza
- Perry Fellwock (born 1947), National Security Agency analyst and whistleblower
- Perry Fenwick (born 1962), English actor known for playing Billy Mitchell in the BBC serial drama EastEnders
- Perry Ferguson (1901–1963), American art director, nominated for five Academy Awards
- Perry Fewell (born 1962), American football coach
- Perry Filkins (born 1988), American mixed martial artist
- Perry Florio (born 1967), American hockey player
- Perry Freshwater (born 1973), English rugby union footballer
- Perry A. Frey (born 1935), American biochemist
- Perry Friedman (born 1968), American professional poker player
- Perry Ganchar (born 1963), Canadian hockey player
- Perry Gomez (1947–2023), Bahamian politician and Minister of Health of The Bahamas
- Perry Graves (1889–1979), American football player
- Perry Green (poker player) (born 1936), American poker player
- Perry Joseph Green (fl. 1910s), philosopher and preacher of the New Thought Movement
- Perry Grimm (1914–1971), American racecar driver
- Perry Grimm (American football) (1888–1974), American football coach
- Perry Groves (born 1965), English footballer
- Perry Haddock (born 1959), Australian Rugby League player
- Perry Hale (1878–1948), American football player and coach
- Perry N. Halkitis (born 1963), American psychologist
- Perry Hannah (1824–1904), American politician
- Perry Harrington (born 1958), American football player
- Perry G. Harrington (1812–1876), American politician and farmer

=== H–R ===
- Perry Harris (1946–2021), New Zealand rugby union player
- Perry Hartnett (born 1960), American football player
- Perry Henzell (1936–2006), Jamaican film director
- Perry Hill (baseball) (born 1952), American Major League Baseball coach
- Perry Hoberman (born 1954), American installation artist
- Perry Greeley Holden (1865–1959), first professor of agronomy in the United States
- Perry Hooper Sr. (1925–2016), American jurist and the 27th Chief Justice of the Alabama Supreme Court
- Perry Hooper Jr. (born 1954), American politician
- Perry Howard (1835–1907), African-American attorney and Special Assistant to the Attorney General in the 1920s
- Perry Hudson (1918–2017), American urologist
- Perry Hummel (born 1935), American politician
- Perry Jackson (1905–1973), American football player
- Perry Johanson (1910–1981), American architect
- Perry Johnson (born 1977), Canadian hockey player
- Perry Jones (born 1991), American basketball player
- Perry T. Jones (1890–1970), American tennis official
- Perry Jordan (1943–2014), American musician
- Perry Kalynuk (fl. 2000s), Canadian politician
- Perry J. Kaufman (born 1943), American quantitative financial theorist, trader, and author
- Perry Keenan, American politician
- Perry Keith (1847–1935), American politician and co-founder and namesake of Keithville, Louisiana
- Perry Kemp (born 1961), American football player
- Perry Kendall (born 1943), Canadian physician and the first Provincial Health Officer of British Columbia
- Perry Keyes (born 1966), Australian singer-songwriter
- Perry King (born 1948), American actor
- Perry Kitchen (born 1992), American soccer player
- Perry Kivolowitz (born 1961), American computer scientist, inventor, lecturer, and Academy Award winner
- Perry Klein (born 1971), American football quarterback in the National Football League who played for the Atlanta Falcons
- Perry Kollie (born 1982), Liberian footballer
- Perry Kramer (born 1959), American Bicycle Motocross (BMX) racer
- Perry Lafferty (1917–2005), American television producer
- Perry Lang (born 1959), American director, writer, and actor
- Perry Lawson (born 1982), British basketball player
- Perry Lentz (born 1943), American professor of English language and literature
- Perry Lim (born 1972), Singaporean army general and the Chief of Defence Force of the Singapore Armed Forces
- Perry Link (born 1944), American professor
- Perry Lipe (1875–1955), American minor-league baseball player and manager
- Perry London (1931–1992), American psychologist
- Perry Lopez (1929–2008), American actor
- Perry Marshall (fl. 1990s–2020s), American entrepreneur and author
- Perry Martter (1901–1954), American wrestler
- Perry Maxwell (1879–1952), American golf course architect
- Perry McCarthy (born 1961), British racing driver
- Perry McGillivray (1893–1944), American Olympic swimmer and water polo player
- Perry McGriff (1937–2017), American politician
- Perry Mehrling (born 1959), American professor
- Perry Meisel (fl. 1970s–2010s), American writer and professor
- Perry Miller (1905–1963), American historian and an authority on American Puritanism
- Perry Miller (ice hockey) (born 1952), National Hockey League player
- Perry Millward (born 1992), English actor
- Perry Minasian (born 1980), American baseball executive
- Perry Moore (1971–2011), American author, screenwriter, and film director
- Perry Moss (1926–2014), American football player
- Perry Moss (basketball) (born 1958), American basketball player
- Perry Moss (golfer) (born 1969), professional golfer
- Perry Mubanga (born 1983), Zambian footballer
- Perry Mutapa (born 1979), Zambian footballer
- Perry Ng (born 1996), English footballer
- Perry Noble (born 1971), American preacher and senior pastor of NewSpring Church in South Carolina
- Perry Nove (fl. 1990s–2000s), British police officer and Commissioner of the City of London police
- Perry Nussbaum (1908–1987), the rabbi of Congregation Beth Israel from 1954 to 1973
- Perry Owens (1852–1919), American lawman and gunfighter of the Old West
- Perry Pandrea (born 1970), American musician
- Perry Parker (born 1987), Scottish rugby union player
- Perry Diamond Pearl (c. 1824–?), American politician
- Perry Pearn (born 1951), Canadian hockey player
- Perry Pelensky (born 1962), professional hockey player
- Perry Phenix (born 1974), American football player
- Perry Picasshoe, American visual artist
- Perry Pirkanen (fl. 1980s–1990s), American actor
- Perry T. Rathbone (1911–2000), American museum director
- Perry Redd (born 1964), American social activist
- Perry A. C. Reed (1871–1943), American politician
- Perry Rein (fl. 1990s–2010s), American television writer and producer
- Perry Rendell (born 1970), English cricketer
- Perry Richardson (born 1958), American musician
- Perry Riley, American football player
- Perry Robertson, American sound editor and musician
- Perry Robinson, American jazz clarinetist and composer
- Perry Ray Robinson, American civil rights activist
- Perry Rose, Belgian-Irish singer
- Perry Rosemond, Canadian television writer, producer, and director
- Perry Rosenthal, Canadian-American eye surgeon and professor
- Perry Rotella, American businessman
- Perry Russo (1941–1995), a key witness in Jim Garrison's investigation of the JFK assassination
- Perry T. Ryan (born 1962), American lawyer and author

=== S–Z ===
- Perry Salles (1939–2009), Brazilian film director and actor
- Perry Saturn (born 1966), American professional wrestler
- Perry Schwartz (1915–2001), American football player
- Perry Shields (1925–2002), American judge of the United States Tax Court
- Perry Smith (American football) (born 1951), American football player
- Perry Edward Smith (1928–1965), murderer depicted in the book In Cold Blood
- Perry Smith (politician) (1783–1852), American congressman
- Perry H. Smith (1828–1885), American state senator and state assemblyman
- Perry M. Smith (born 1934), United States Air Force general
- Perry So (born 1982), Hong Kong orchestral conductor
- Perry Stephens (1958–2005), American actor
- Perry Stevenson (born 1987), American basketball coach
- Perry Stone (disc jockey), American disc jockey
- Perry Suckling (born 1965), English footballer
- Perry Haydn Taylor (born 1966), English designer and marketer
- Perry Ten Eyck (1907–1959), American basketball coach
- Perry Thomas (fl. 2000s–2020s), American football coach
- Perry Thurston (born 1961), American politician
- Perry Trimper (fl. 2010s–2020s), Canadian politician
- Perry Turnbull (born 1959), Canadian hockey player
- Perry Tuttle (born 1959), American football player
- Perry Ubeda (born 1971), Dutch kickboxer
- Perry Van der Beck (born 1959), American soccer player, manager and executive
- Perry N. Vekroff (1881–1937), American film director, screenwriter, and actor of the silent era
- Perry Wallace (1948–2017), professor of law and former college basketball player
- Perry Warbington (1952–2008), American basketball player
- Perry Watkins (1948–1996), American gay United States Army enlisted man, best known for his successful lawsuit against the military
- Perry Watson (born 1950), American college basketball coach
- Perry Werden (1865–1934), American baseball player
- Perry Hunt Wheeler (1913–1989), American landscape architect
- Perry Williams (cornerback) (born 1961), American football player
- Perry Williams (running back) (born 1946), American football player
- Perry Winslow (1815–1890), American whaling ship master
- Perry Woodall (1912–1975), American politician
- Perry Young (born 1963), American basketball player
- Perry Deane Young (1941–2019), American author and journalist

== Female ==
- Perry Miller Adato (1920–2018), American film producer
- Perry Bard (1944–2025), Canadian artist
- Perry Blackwell, American actress in the 1959 film Pillow Talk
- Perry Buck (born 1961/1962), American politician
- Perry Chiu, Hong Kong actress
- Perry County Jane Doe (1941–1978), American unidentified woman
- Perry Howze, American writer in the films Maid to Order (1987), Mystic Pizza (1988), Chances Are (1989)
- Perry Lindsay (1895–1966), American writer
- Perry Lister (born 1959), English dancer, singer and actress
- Perry Mattfeld (fl. 2000s–2020s), American actress and producer
- Perry Mooney, Australian actress
- Perry Neville, British actress in the TV series Bernard's Watch (1997–2005)
- Perry Piercy, New Zealand actress
- Perry Rubin, daughter of Sam Rubin
- Perry Sheehan, American actress
- Perry Wilson (1916–2009), American actress

== Fictional characters ==
- Perry Carter, in the British comedy Kevin the Teenager and related media
- Perry Cox, on the comedy television series Scrubs
- Perry Malinowski, in the film Final Destination 3
- Perry Mason, main character in works of detective fiction written by Erle Stanley Gardner
- Perry Rhodan, the titular protagonist of the German science fiction pulp magazine
- Perry White, Clark Kent's editor-in-chief at the Daily Planet
- Perry the Platypus, an anthropomorphic pet platypus of Phineas and Ferb
- Perry, the official mascot of the 2022 Commonwealth Games

== See also ==
- Perry (surname)
- Perry (disambiguation)
- Perri (name), a surname and given name
- Peri (name), a surname or feminine given name
