= Perri (surname) =

Perri is a surname. Notable people with the name include:

- Christina Perri (born 1986), American singer
- Dan Perri (born 1945), American film titles designer
- Dominic Perri, Canadian politician
- Fortunato N. Perri Jr., attorney
- Jack Perri (born 1975), men's basketball head coach
- Leslie Perri (died 1970), American science fiction fan, writer and illustrator
- Lucas Perri (born 1997), Brazilian professional footballer
- Matteo Perri (born 1998), Italian professional footballer
- Nick Perri (born 1984), guitarist
- Oreste Perri (born 1951), Italian sprint canoer and politician
- Paul Perri, Canadian-American actor
- Rocco Perri (1887–1944), organized crime figure
- Sandro Perri, Canadian rock and electronic musician

== See also ==
- Parri, given name and surname
- Peri (name), given name and surname
- Porri (surname)
- Perri (disambiguation)
- Perry (surname)
