= Perri (name) =

Perri is a predominantly feminine given name and a surname. Notable people with the name include:

== Given name ==
- Perri 6, British social scientist born David Ashworth
- Perri Cutten (1952–2025), Australian fashion designer
- Perri Kiely (born 1995), British street dancer
- Perri Klass, American pediatrician and writer
- Perri Lister (born 1959), English actress, dancer, choreographer, singer, former model and screenwriter
- Perri O'Shaughnessy, pen name of American crime novelists and sisters Mary and Pamela O'Shaughnessy
- Perri "Pebbles" Reid (born 1964), American dance-pop and urban contemporary singer
- Perri Peltz (born 1961), American television journalist
- Perri Pierre (born 1988), American award-winning filmmaker and actor
- Perri Shakes-Drayton (born 1988), British track and field athlete
- Perri Williams (born 1966), Irish racewalker

== See also ==
- Parri, given name and surname
- Peri (name), given name and surname
- Perry (given name)
- Perri (surname)
- Perry (surname)
- Porri (disambiguation), includes list of people with surname Porri
