= Peary =

Peary may refer to:

== People ==
=== Last name ===
- Danny Peary (born 1949), American film critic and sports writer
- Gerald Peary (born 1944), American film critic
- Harold Peary (1908–1985), American actor, comedian and singer
- Josephine Diebitsch Peary (1863–1955), American author and arctic explorer, wife of Robert Peary
- Marie Ahnighito Peary (1893–1978), American author, daughter of Robert Peary
- Robert Peary (1856–1920), American explorer

=== First name ===
- Peary Chand Mitra (1814–1883), Indian author and journalist
- Peary Rader (1909–1991), American early bodybuilder, Olympic lifter, writer, and magazine publisher
- Peary Charan Sarkar (1823–1875), pioneer in women's education in Bengal

=== Middle name ===
- Benjamin Peary Pal (1906–1989), Indian plant breeder and agronomist

== Locations ==
=== Canada ===
- Peary Bay, in Nunavut
- Peary Channel, a waterway in Nunavut

=== Greenland ===
- Cape Peary, a headland in northwestern Greenland
- Mary Peary Peaks, a mountain in northern Greenland
- Peary Channel (Greenland), a hypothetical sound in Northern Greenland
- Peary Glacier, a glacier in western Greenland
- Peary Land, a peninsula in northern Greenland
- Peary Nunatak, a nunatak in eastern Greenland

=== United States ===
- Admiral Peary Vocational-Technical School, in Cambria County, Pennsylvania
- Peary, Minnesota, an unincorporated community in Saint Louis County
- Peary, Virginia, an unincorporated community in Mathews County
- Peary–MacMillan Arctic Museum, in Brunswick, Maine

=== Elsewhere ===
- Mount Peary, a massif in Antarctic
- Peary (crater), the closest large lunar impact crater to the lunar north pole

== Ships ==
- Maersk Peary, a Norway-registered tanker landed in 2004
- SS Robert E. Peary, an American "Liberty ship" launched in 1942
- USS Robert E. Peary, or variants thereof, several ships of the United States Navy

== Other ==
- Peary Arctic Club, American-based club that promoted the Arctic expeditions of Robert Peary
- Peary caribou, a caribou subspecies in Canada
- Peary Polar Expedition Medal, authorized by the United States Congress in 1944
- Camp Peary, a U.S. military reservation and Central Intelligence Agency facility in Virginia

== See also ==
- Pari (disambiguation)
- John Perie
- Perrie
- Perry, an alcoholic beverage made of fermented pear juice
- Perry (disambiguation)
- Pery (disambiguation)
