= Pari =

Pari or PARI may refer to:

== Places ==
- Pari, Estonia, a village in Vastseliina Parish, Võru County, Estonia
- Pari, Raebareli, a village in Uttar Pradesh, India
- Pari, Hamadan or Piruz, a village in Hamadan Province, Iran
- Pari, Iran, a village in Zanjan Province, Iran
- Piruz, Iran, also known as Pari
- Pari, Civitella Paganico, a village in Grosseto, Tuscany, Italy
- Pari, Gilgit Baltistan, a village in Skardu district, Pakistan

== Film ==
- Pari (1995 film), an Iranian production
- Pari (2018 Pakistani film)
- Pari (2018 Indian film), a Hindi-language film

== People ==
- Pari people, an ethnic group in Sudan
- Pari Abasalti (born 1935), Iranian-born American journalist and politician
- Pari Saberi (1932–2024), Iranian drama and theatre director
- Akilan Pari (born 1989), Indian basketball player
- Claudio Pari (1574–1619), Italian composer
- Vēl Pāri, an ancient Tamil king
- Pāri family, an aristocratic Tamil house who are descendents of Vēl Pāri

== Acronym ==
- People's Archive of Rural India, a digital journalism platform in India
- Philippine Association of the Record Industry
- Pisgah Astronomical Research Institute, an astronomical observatory near Asheville, North Carolina, United States

== Other uses ==
- Pari (unit), an obsolete unit of measure
- Pari Temple, a 14th-century Hindu temple in East Java, Indonesia
- PARI/GP, a computer algebra system
- Pari, a cultivar of Karuka
- Parī, a supernatural being in Iranian folklore

== See also ==
- Päri (disambiguation)
- Paari (1966 film), an Indian Bengali-language film
- Paari (2000 film), an Indian Meitei-language film
- Peary (disambiguation)
- Peri (disambiguation)
- Perrie (disambiguation)
- Perry (disambiguation)
