= Parry (given name) =

Parry is a given name which may refer to the following people:

- Parry Aftab (fl. 1980s–2020s), American lawyer specializing in Internet privacy and security law
- Parry Glasspool (born 1992), British actor
- Parry Gordon (1945–2009), English rugby league footballer
- Parry Gripp (born 1967), songwriter, lead vocalist and guitarist for the pop punk band Nerf Herder
- Parry Wayne Humphreys (1778–1839), member of the United States House of Representatives from Tennessee
- Parry Liyanage (fl. 1960s–2010s), Sri Lankan army officer, athlete and coach
- Parry Mitchell, Baron Mitchell (born 1943), British businessman and Labour member of the House of Lords
- Parry Moon (1898–1988), American engineer
- Parry Nickerson (born 1994), American football player
- Parry O'Brien (1932–2007), American shot putter
- Parry Osayande (born 1936), Nigerian deputy
- Parry Shen (born 1973), American actor
- Parry Teasdale (fl. 1960s–2010s), American video artist
- E. Parry Thomas (1921–2016), American banker who helped finance the development of the casino industry of Las Vegas

== See also ==
- Perry (given name)
