= Peri (disambiguation) =

A peri is a fairy-like creature in Middle Eastern and Asian mythology.

Peri may also refer to:

== Arts and entertainment ==
- La Péri (Burgmüller), a ballet by Friedrich Burgmüller, Jean Coralli, and Théophile Gautier, first performed in 1843
- La Péri (Dukas), a ballet by Paul Dukas and Ivan Clustine, first performed in 1912
- Peri Brown, one of the companions in the TV series Doctor Who
- Peri Lomax, a character from British soap opera Hollyoaks

== Companies and organisations ==
- Great Wall Peri, a car made by Chinese company Great Wall Motor
- PERI, a Germany-based provider of formwork and scaffolding systems
- Partido Ecologista Radical Intransigente, a Uruguayan green party
- Peri Spiele, a former Austria board and card games manufacturer

== Places ==
- Peri, Corse-du-Sud, a commune on Corsica, France
- Peri, Estonia, a village
- Peri, a village in Husnicioara Commune, Mehedinţi, Romania

== Other uses ==
- Peri (name), a surname and a given name
- Political Economy Research Institute, at the University of Massachusetts Amherst
- Political Economy of Research and Innovation, an emerging academic field
- USS Peri (1861), a Union Navy ship of the American Civil War
- Peri, an arene substitution pattern
- Peri, a dialect of the Kalanga language, a Bantu language spoken in Botswana and Zimbabwe

== See also ==
- Gyala Peri, a peak just beyond the eastern end of the Himalayas
- Pichal Peri, a popular topic for ghost stories in Central and South Asia
- Pari (disambiguation)
- Peary (disambiguation)
- Perri (disambiguation)
- Perrie, a surname
- Perry (disambiguation)
- Pery (disambiguation)
- Piri (disambiguation)
- Piri piri, also spelled peri peri, the African bird's eye chili
