= Porro (disambiguation) =

Porro is a Colombian musical style and dance.

Porro may refer also to:

== Places ==
- Porro Bluff, Graham Land, Antarctica
- Porro, Kenya, a village

== Other uses ==
- Porro (surname)
- Porro prism, a type of prism arrangement in a set of binoculars that serves to invert a visual image
- Porron or porró, a traditional Spanish glass wine pitcher
