= Päri =

Päri may refer to:

- Päri language (also known as Lokoro language), language spoken in South Sudan
- Päri, Lääne County, village in Lääne-Nigula Parish, Lääne County, Estonia
- Päri, Viljandi County, village in Viljandi Parish, Viljandi County, Estonia

== See also ==
- Pari (disambiguation)
- Pari, Estonia, village in Võru Parish, Võru County, Estonia
