= Perrée =

Perrée is a French surname. Notable people with the surname include:

- Jean-Baptiste Perrée (1761–1800), French Navy officer
- John Perrée (1913/14–1959), victim of Francis Joseph Huchet
- Louis Perrée (1871–1924), French fencer

== See also ==
- Perrey
