= Parris (disambiguation) =

Parris is a surname and a given name.

Parris may also refer to:

== Places ==
- Parris, Texas, a ghost town in Collin County, Texas, USA
- Parris Island (disambiguation)
  - Parris Island, South Carolina, United States
- Parris Brook Historic and Archeological District, Exeter, Rhode Island, USA

== Other uses ==
- Parris Manufacturing Company, U.S. toy manufacturer

== See also ==
- Parri (surname); plural as "Parris"
- Noyes-Parris House, Massachusetts
- Paris (disambiguation)
  - Paris, France
