= Mogadishu (disambiguation) =

Mogadishu is the largest city in Somalia and the nation's capital.

Mogadishu may also refer to:

- Sultanate of Mogadishu, a medieval Somali sultanate centered in southern Somalia
- Port of Mogadishu, the largest harbour in Somalia
- Mogadishu University, a non-governmental university in the Somali capital of Mogadishu
- Little Mogadishu, the Cedar-Riverside region of Minneapolis
- Diocese of Mogadishu, of the Roman Catholic Church
- Mogadishu Line, the point at which foreign involvement in a conflict shifts from peacekeeping or diplomacy to combat operations
- Mogadishu Mile, a route taken by American soldiers during the Battle of Mogadishu in 1993
- Mogadishu (play), a play by Vivienne Franzmann
- Mogadischu (film) (2008), directed by Roland Suso Richter and about the hijacking

== See also ==
- Battle of Mogadishu (disambiguation)
- Mogadishu bombings (disambiguation)
