= Jutul =

Jutul may refer to:

- IL Jutul, Norwegian sports club from Bærum, Akershus
- Jutul (ship)
- Fictional family in Ragnarok (TV series)
