= Peri (name) =

Peri is a given name and surname in various cultures.

== People with the surname ==
Peri
- Language: various

Origin
- Region of origin: Italy, Hungary

Other names
- Variant forms: Perini, Perić, Perich, Peris

- Achille Peri (1812–1880), Italian composer and conductor
- Claude Péri (born 1972), French figure skating coach and former competitor
- Cristina Peri Rossi (born 1941), Uruguayan novelist, poet, and author of short stories
- Edson Peri (1928–2025), Brazilian water polo player
- Enzo Martins Peri, Brazilian Army commander
- Gabriel Péri (1902–1941), French communist journalist and politician, member of the French Resistance
- Jacopo Peri (1561–1633), Italian composer and singer
- Michael Peri (born 1967), US Army soldier convicted of espionage
- Peter Laszlo Peri (1899–1967), Hungarian artist, sculptor and architect
- Peter Peri (born 1971), British artist, grandson of Peter Laszlo Péri
- Yaakov Peri (born 1944), head of the Israeli domestic intelligence agency and CEO of Cellcom Israel

== People with the given name ==
Peri
- Pronunciation: /ˈpɛri/
- Gender: Female

Origin
- Region of origin: English language

Other names
- Popularity: see popular names

- Peri Baumeister (born 1986), German actress
- Peri Bearman (born 1953), academic scholar of Islamic law
- Peri Drysdale (born 1954), New Zealand businesswoman
- Peri Gilpin (born 1961), American actress
- Peri Horne (born 1932), British figure skater
- Peri Marošević (born 1989), American former soccer player
- Peri Neufeld (1913–1982), Israeli association football player
- Peri Suzan Özkum (born 1959), Turkish diver
- Peri Vaevae Pare (died 2020), Cook Islands politician
- Peri Pourier (born 1983), American politician
- Peri Sandria (born 1969), Indonesian footballer
- Peri Schwartz (born 1951), American painter and printmaker
- Peri Sundaram (1890–1957), Ceylonese politician
- Peri Tarr, American computer scientist

== Fictional characters ==
- Peri Brown in the British science fiction series Doctor Who
- Peri Lomax in the British soap opera Hollyoaks
- Peri Westmore in Devious Maids
- Peri, a girl from Julie's Greenroom
- Peri, an orange mutant from TV series, Spliced
- Peri, a male fairy from the animated series The Fairly OddParents: A New Wish

== See also ==
- Gastone Brilli-Peri (1893–1930), Italian racing driver
- John Perie VC (1831–1874), Scottish soldier
- Parry (disambiguation)
- Peri (disambiguation)
- Perri (disambiguation)
- Perry (disambiguation)
- Porri (disambiguation)
