= USS Robert E. Peary =

Several ships of the United States Navy have been named Peary or Robert E. Peary, after Robert E. Peary (1856–1920), the Arctic explorer.

- USS Peary (DD-226) was a Clemson-class destroyer, launched in 1920, and sunk in action during the Bombing of Darwin, Australia, in 1942.
- USS Robert E. Peary (DE-132) was an Edsall-class destroyer escort launched in 1943, and struck from the Naval Vessel Register in 1966.
- USS Robert E. Peary (FF-1073) was a Knox-class frigate, which launched in 1971. She was struck in 1995 and transferred to the Republic of China. The ship served in the Taiwanese Navy as ROCS Chi Yang (932).
- USNS Robert E. Peary (T-AKE-5) is a Lewis and Clark-class dry cargo ship, launched in 2007.

In addition:

- SS Robert E. Peary was a Liberty ship, built in 1942 — in a record time of 4 days and 15 hours and 29 minutes. She was scrapped in 1963.
- Maersk Peary is a sealift tanker that services McMurdo, Antarctica and Thule, Greenland.
