= Granville Fjord =

Fjord in Avannaata, Greenland

- Iterlassuaq (Greenlandic)
- Location in Greenland
- Location: Arctic
- Coordinates: 76°52′N 70°1′W
- Ocean/sea sources: Baffin Bay
- Basin countries: Greenland
- Max. length: 25 km (16 mi)
- Max. width: 4 km (2.5 mi)

Granville Fjord (Greenlandic: Iterlassuaq) is a fjord in Avannaata municipality, Northwest Greenland.

Granville Fjord was named after Granville Leveson-Gower, 2nd Earl Granville by English explorer Edward Augustus Inglefield in 1852.

== Geography ==
Granville Fjord is located in Steensby Land, in the stretch of coast between Cape York and Cape Alexander. It is located northwest of the Wolstenholme Fjord, close to the abandoned Moriusaq Inuit settlement, located to the southeast of the fjord. The fjord is about 50 km (31 mi) northwest of Pituffik Space Base.

The fjord's mouth is located NW of Saunders Island, to the WNW of the Wolstenholme Fjord, between the points of Manussaq and Uvdlisautinguag. Cape Peary is the headland on the eastern side of the mouth. The fjord stretches for about 25 km (16 mi) in a roughly NE/SW direction and its shores are lined by ice-covered mountains. The Berlingske Glacier has its terminus at the head of the fjord.

Three Sister Bees are a group of small and flat islands that lie at the mouth of the fjord.

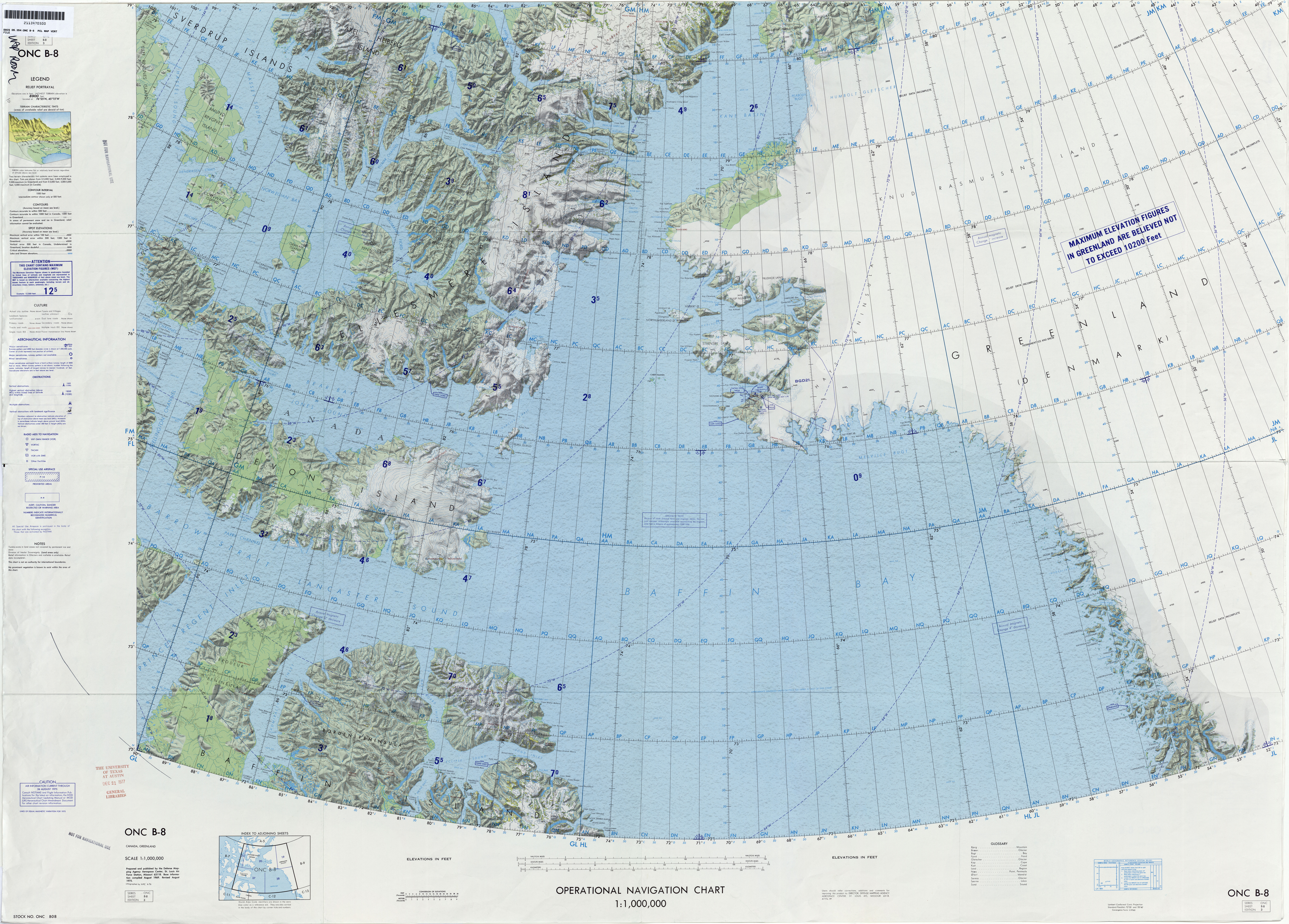
Map of Northwestern Greenland

== See also ==
- List of fjords of Greenland
