= Rising Star (1991 ship) =

United States Air Force tugboat

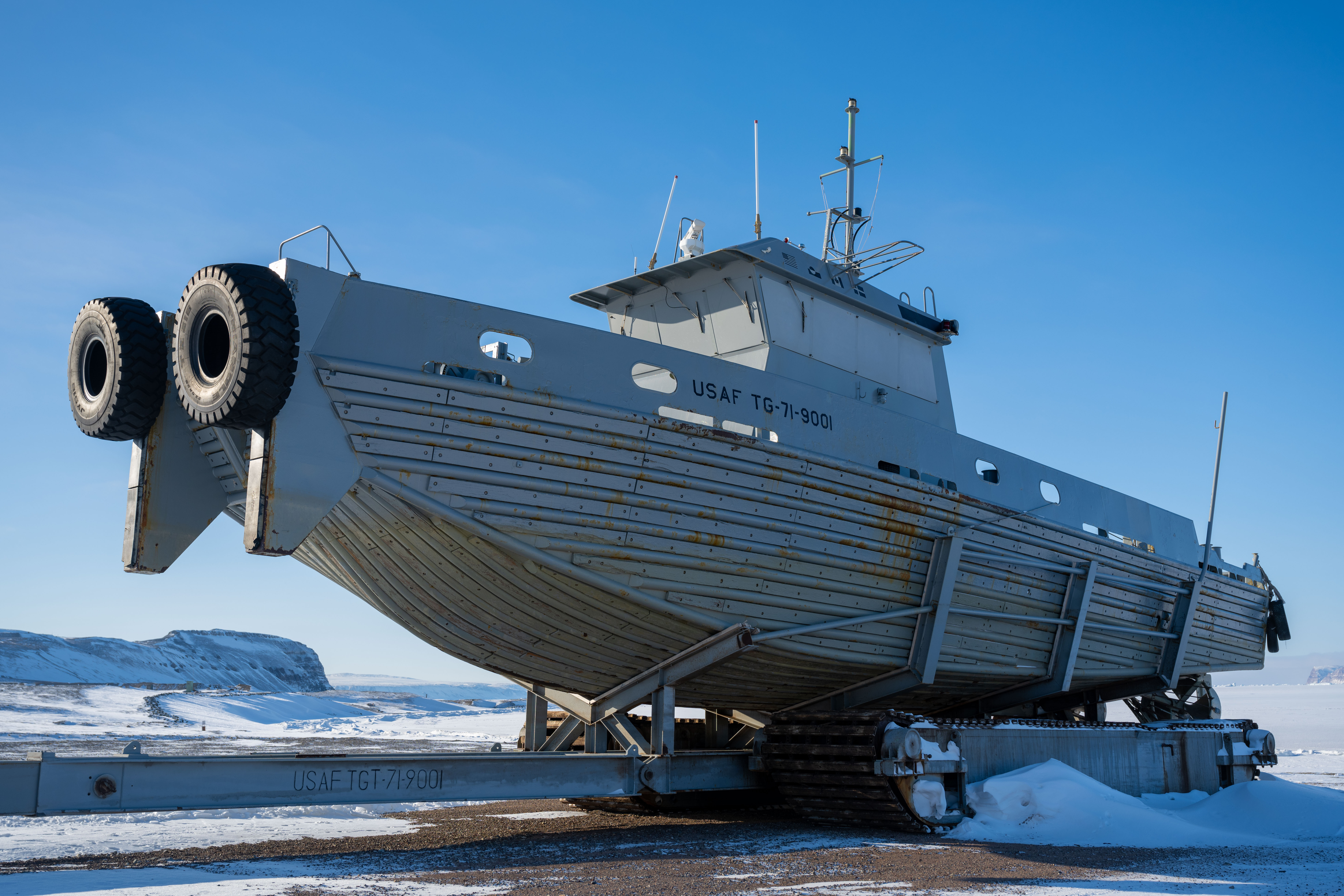
- Rising Star stored ashore

History

United States
- Name: Rising Star
- Owner: United States Air Force
- Operator: Vectrus
- Port of registry: Pituffik, Greenland
- Builder: Swiftships, Morgan City, Louisiana
- In service: 1991
- Identification: TG-71-9001
- Status: Active

General characteristics
- Class & type: Tugboat
- Length: 71 feet (22 m)
- Installed power: 2 × 900 shaft horsepower (670 kW) two-stroke diesel engines

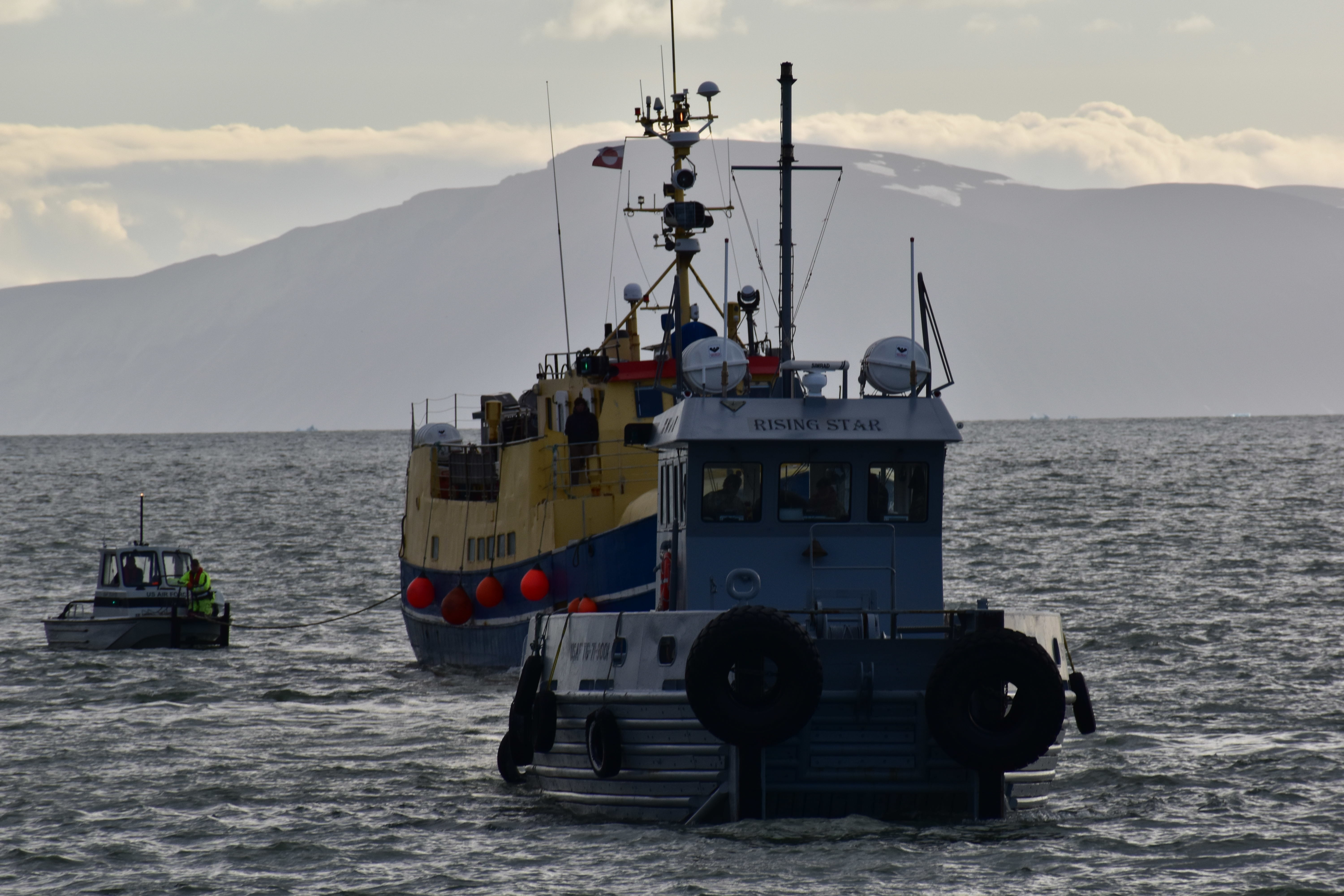
Rising Star rescues ship

Rising Star (USAF TG-71-9001) is a harbor tugboat built in 1991 for the United States Air Force and based at Pituffik Space Base in northern Greenland, formerly Thule Air Base. Constructed by Swiftships in Morgan City, Louisiana, the 71-foot (22 m) steel vessel is the only tugboat in Air Force service and is operated under contract by Vectrus. During the brief period of warm weather when North Star Bay is free of ice, it guides tankers and cargo ships—including the annual Operation Pacer Goose resupply—into the shallow harbor, pulls them into Mediterranean mooring positions, and clears icebergs from the shipping lanes. For the remainder of the year it is hauled ashore to protect it from Arctic ice. In 2020, the tug was credited with rescuing six Greenlandic mariners after their vessel began to sink south of the base.

== Construction and history ==
Rising Star was built in 1991 at the Swiftships yard in Morgan City, Louisiana. The tugboat is 71 feet (22 m) long and powered by two two-stroke diesel engines manufactured by Detroit Diesel, capable of generating 900 shaft horsepower (670 kW) each. A prior US military naming of Rising Star associated with Greenland was the 1957–1958 code name "Rising-Star", where Army Air Defense Command used Project Nike missile emplacements to protect the Goose Air Defense Sector.

The ship entered United States Air Force service at Pituffik Space Base, formerly Thule Air Base, in 1992. It is the only ship operated by the USAF apart from three unmanned aerial vehicle (UAV) recovery craft operated by the 82nd Aerial Targets Squadron at Tyndall Air Force Base, Florida. Rising Star is the only tugboat in the US Air Force.

== Operations ==
The 821st Support Squadron headquartered at Peterson Space Force Base in Colorado maintains Rising Star. In preparation for port season, as the ice clears, Rising Star normally launches at the beginning of July. At the end of a working season, Rising Star is hauled ashore. In June, July and August, the tugboat escorts fuel tankers and cargo ships, assists them in docking, and removes icebergs from the path of vessels entering North Star Bay. Due to limited under-keel clearance in Pituffik's harbor, such as shallow draft conditions, Rising Star is required to maneuver cargo ships such as Maersk Peary into a Mediterranean mooring configuration.

The ship is involved in annual resupply efforts known as Operation Pacer Goose, when the base is stocked and maintained during the brief warm period, before temperatures once again fall. Icebergs are routinely cleared from North Star Bay by Rising Star. By September, Rising Star is put into maintenance, set in dry dock, repaired and idled to prevent damage, before returning to service the following year.

Rising Star is also used for sightseeing tours of the surrounding bays and fjords.

== 2020 rescue ==
In 2020, Rising Star took part in a rescue operation to save a sinking ship and its crew of six, 50 kilometres (31.1 mi) south of the base, towing the vessel back to the port at Pituffik. On August 3, 2020, a Royal Danish Air Force airplane that departed from the US military base detected a distress call from a local boat crewed by Greenlanders. The crew was traveling the western coast to offer carpentry services to isolated communities when their ship took on water and began to sink. A crew of staff from Vectrus, a military contractor that supports the US presence in Greenland, took Rising Star to assist the Greenlanders. Despite rough waters, Rising Star, with the assistance of the Danish Air Force, rescued the distressed ship, bringing it back to the base. The rescue operation took seven hours from Rising Star's arrival. Of the rescue, Vectrus' civilian operations manager aboard Rising Star, Casper Jensen, reported facing two-meter waves, rough seas, and said "[It was] like a washing machine". Rising Star was assisted on the rescue by the Royal Danish Air Airforce, the 821st Strategic Aerospace Division, Joint Arctic Command, and the Joint Rescue Coordination Center.

== Gallery ==
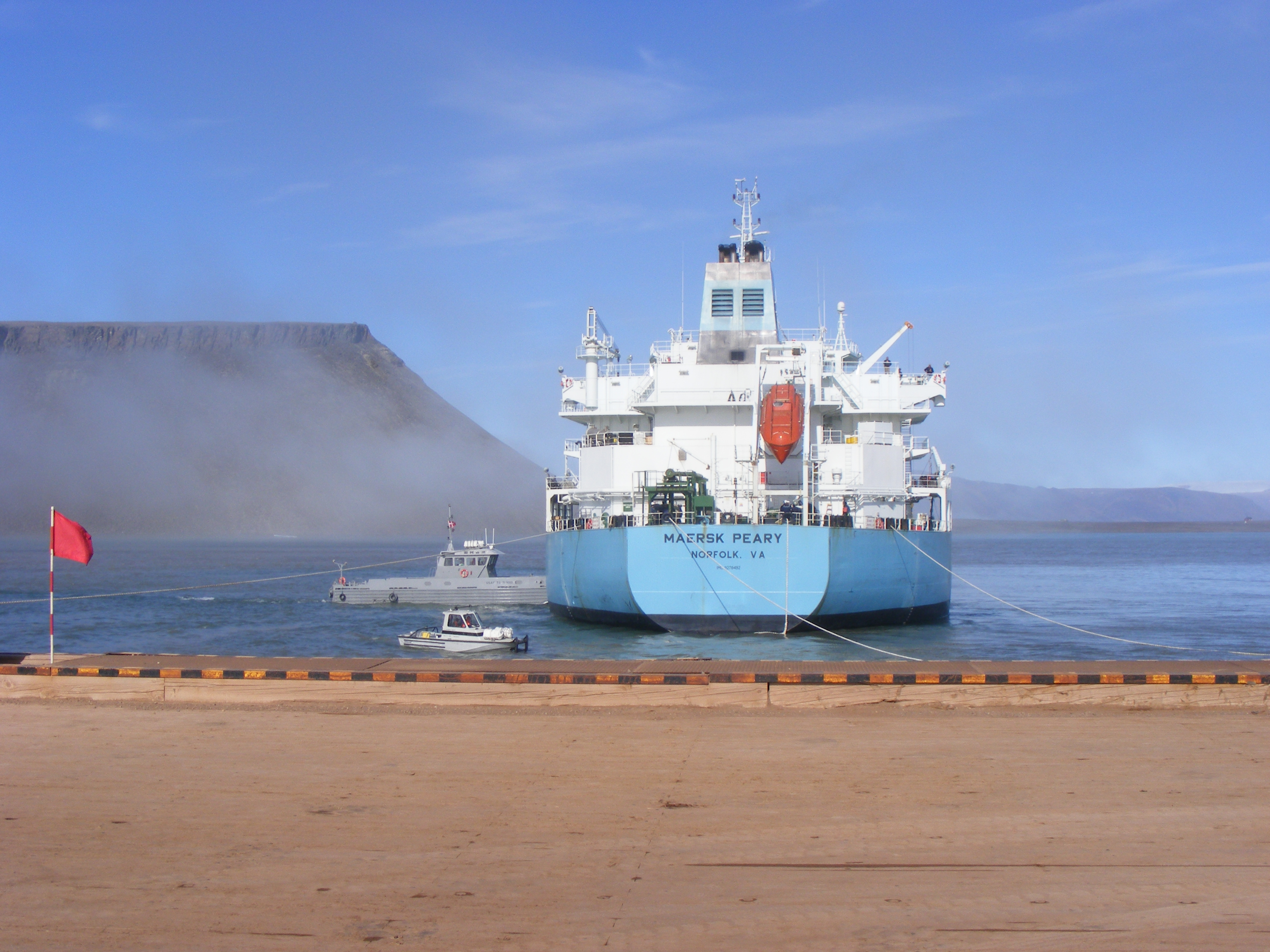
Pushing Maersk Peary

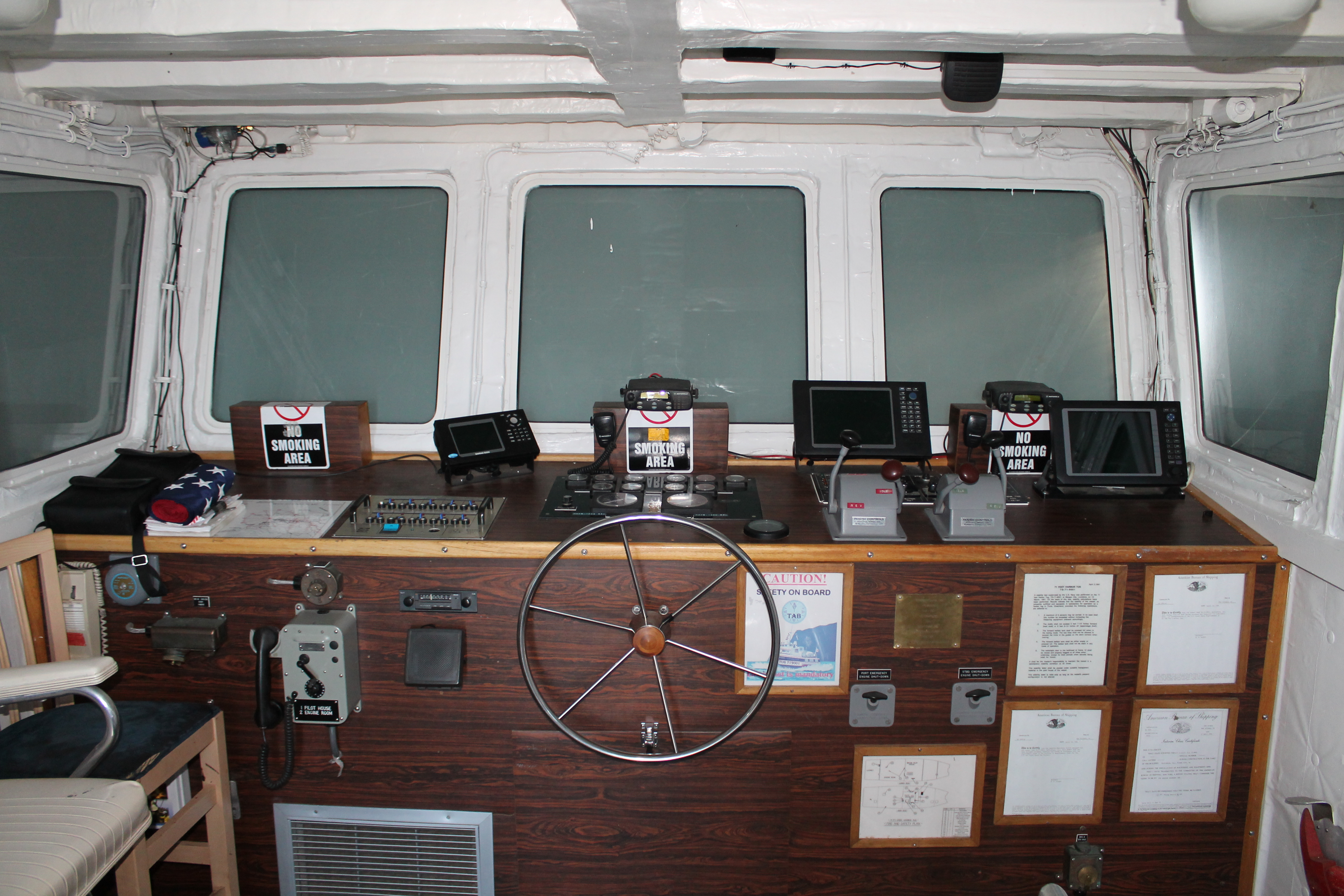
Bridge and wheelhouse

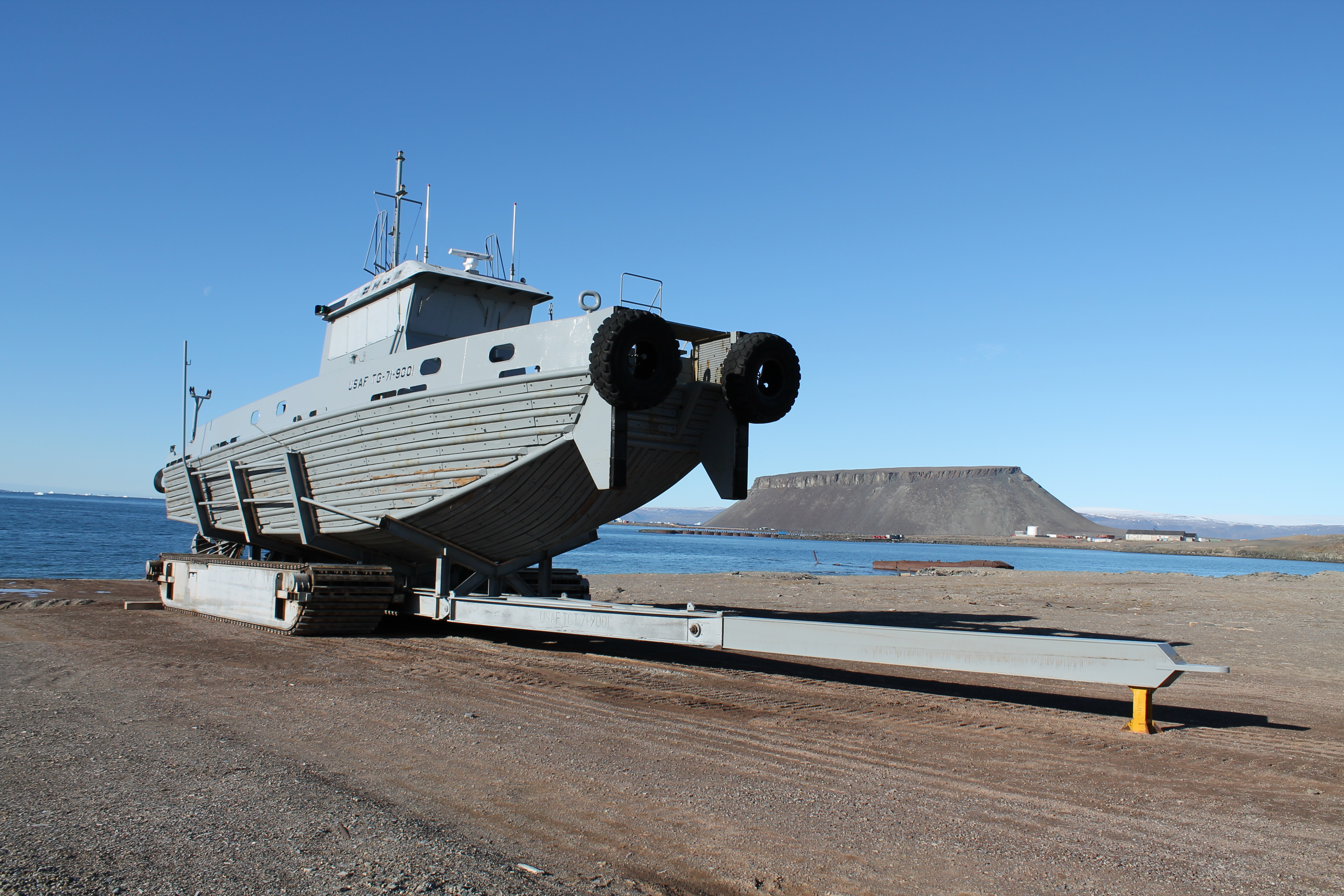
Beached at Pituffik

== See also ==
- List of equipment of the United States Armed Forces § Watercraft
