= Perić =

Perić is a surname, very common in Croatia and Serbia. Notable people with the surname include:

- Borislava Perić (born 1972), Serbian table tennis player
- Darko Perić (footballer) (born 1978), Croatian footballer
- Dino Perić (born 1994), Croatian footballer
- Dragan Perić (born 1964), retired Serbian shot putter and discus thrower
- Janko Peric (born 1949), former Canadian politician
- Milan Perić (born 1986), Serbian footballer
- Nedjeljko Perić (born 1950), Croatian engineer
- Nicolás Peric (born 1978), Chilean goalkeeper of Croatian origin
- Ozren Perić (born 1987), Bosnian footballer
- Ratko Perić (born 1944), Bishop of Mostar-Duvno and Apostolic Administrator of Trebinje-Mrkan
- Sladan Peric (born 1982), Danish professional football player
- Stjepan Perić (born 1983), Croatian actor
- Valter Perić (1919–1945), resistance leader in Sarajevo during World War II

Another version of the same surname is Perich:

- Anton Perich (born 1945), Croatian-American filmmaker, photographer, and video artist
- Cheryl Perich, American teacher whose wrongful termination lawsuit was the impetus for the U.S. Supreme Court case of Hosanna-Tabor Evangelical Lutheran Church and School v. EEOC
- Guillermo Perich, Cuban violinist
- Tristan Perich (born 1982), American contemporary composer

== See also ==
- Peri (name)
