= Perry's =

Perry's or Perrys may refer to:

== Arts, entertainment, and media ==
- Perry's Chemical Engineers' Handbook, a reference book
- The Perrys, a Southern Gospel quartet

== Brands and enterprises ==
- Perry's Ice Cream, an American company
- Perrys Motor Sales, British company
- Perry's Nut House, a tourist stop and store in Maine, United States

== See also ==
- Perry (disambiguation)
- Perry's Cove, Newfoundland and Labrador
