= Cape Peary =

Headland in Greenland

Cape Peary Kap Peary
- Cape
- Coordinates: 76°48′52″N 70°3′27″W
- Location: Avannaata, Greenland
- Offshore water bodies: Granville Fjord; Baffin Bay

Area
  - Total: Arctic
- Elevation: 650 m (2,130 ft)

Cape Peary (Danish: Kap Peary) is a headland in the Avannaata municipality, NW Greenland.

== History ==
This cape was named after US Arctic explorer Robert Peary (1856–1920).

== Geography ==
Cape Peary is located on the eastern side of the shore of Granville Fjord just north of the Drinkard Bluff, about 4 km (2.5 mi) north of the fjord's mouth and 8 km (5.0 mi) northwest of the Moriusaq Inuit settlement.

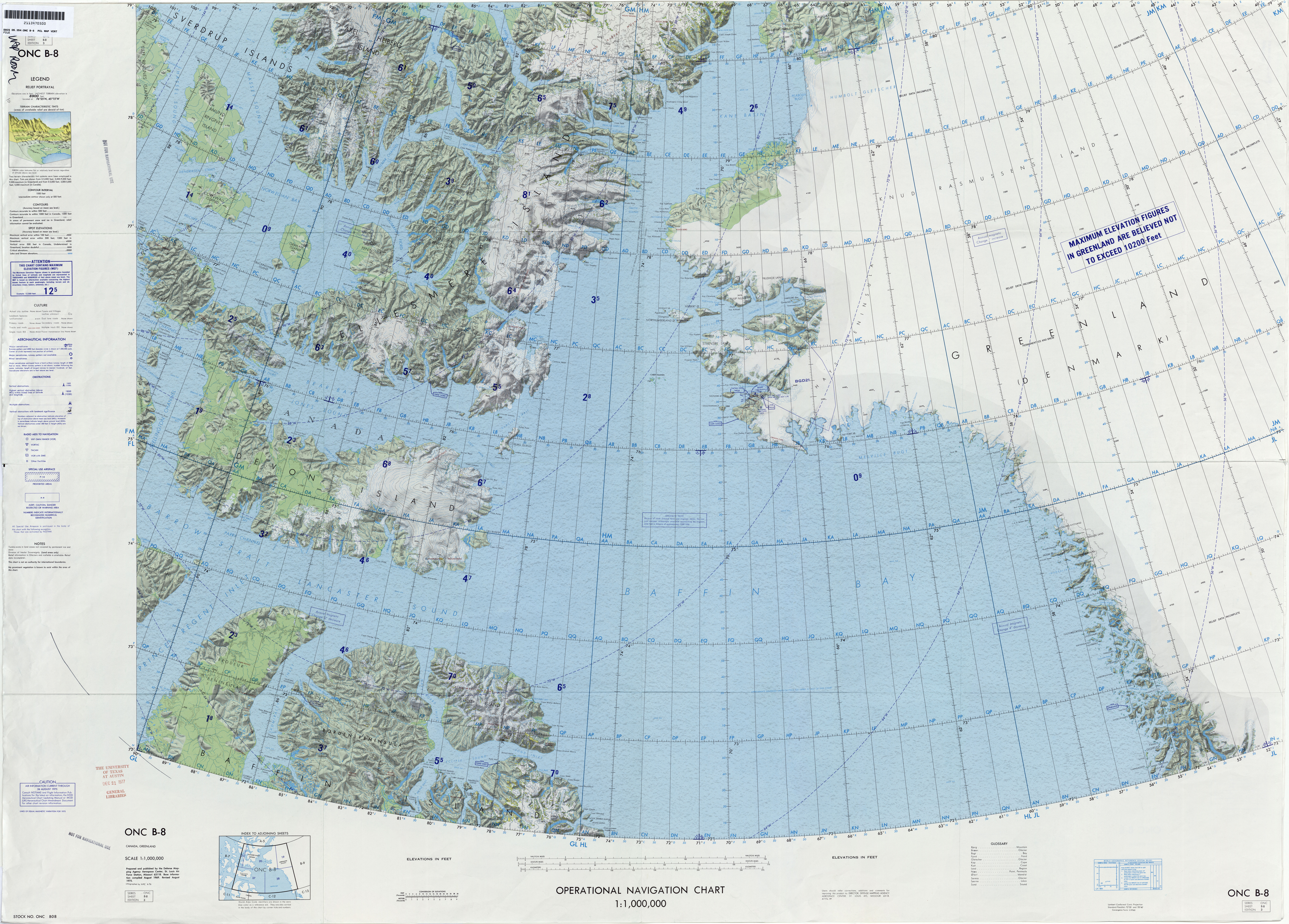
Map of Northwestern Greenland

== See also ==
- North Star Bay
