= Porro (surname) =

Porro is a surname. Notable people with the name include:

- Alicia Porro Freire, Uruguayan poet and librarian
- Arturo Porro (athlete) (1890 - 1967), Italian athlete
- Arturo Porro (sport shooter) (1919–1990), Uruguayan sports shooter
- Benedetta Bianchi Porro (1936–1964), Italian Roman Catholic
- Chiara Porro, Australian diplomat
- Eduardo Porro (1842–1902), Italian obstetrician
- Enrico Porro (1885–1967), Italian wrestler
- Francisco Bartolomé Porró y Reinado, O.F.M. (1739–1814), Spanish prelate of the Roman Catholic Church
- Girolamo Porro (c. 1520–after 1604), Italian engraver
- Blessed Giovannangelo Porro (1451-1505), Italian Roman Catholic priest and hermit
- Maria Corina Porro Martinez (born 1953), Spanish politician
- Ignazio Porro (1801–1875), Italian inventor of optical instruments
- Count Luigi Renato Porro-Lambertenghi (1780-1860) Italian nationalist, businessman, and politician
- Pedro Porro (born 1999), Spanish footballer
- Pierre Jean Porro (1750–1831), French guitarist, composer and music publisher
- Ricardo Porro (1925–2014), Cuban architect

== See also ==
- Porri (surname)
- Porro (disambiguation)
