= Perry River =

Perry River or River Perry may refer to:

== Australia ==
- Perry River (Queensland), see rivers of Queensland
- Perry River (Victoria), Gippsland region, Victoria, Australia

== Canada ==
- Perry River (Nunavut), Chester Bay, Nunavut
- Perry River (Eagle River tributary), British Columbia
- Perry River (Palmer River tributary), Les Appalaches Regional County Municipality, Chaudière-Appalaches, Quebec

== United Kingdom ==
- River Perry, Shropshire, England

== United States ==
- Perry Creek (Missouri River tributary), Iowa

== See also ==
- Perry (disambiguation)
