= Perry County =

Perry County may refer to:

== United States ==
- Perry County, Alabama
- Perry County, Arkansas
- Perry County, Illinois
- Perry County, Indiana
- Perry County, Kentucky
- Perry County, Mississippi
- Perry County, Missouri
- Perry County, Ohio
- Perry County, Pennsylvania
- Perry County, Tennessee

== Australia ==
- Perry County, New South Wales

== See also ==
- Perry (disambiguation)
