= Black Hawk Down (film) =

2001 war film by Ridley Scott

- Theatrical release poster
- Directed by: Ridley Scott
- Screenplay by: Ken Nolan
- Based on: Black Hawk Down: A Story of Modern War by Mark Bowden
- Produced by: Jerry Bruckheimer; Ridley Scott
- Starring: Josh Hartnett; Eric Bana; Ewan McGregor; Tom Sizemore; William Fichtner; Sam Shepard
- Cinematography: Sławomir Idziak
- Edited by: Pietro Scalia
- Music by: Hans Zimmer
- Production companies: Columbia Pictures; Revolution Studios; Jerry Bruckheimer Films; Scott Free Productions
- Distributed by: Sony Pictures Releasing
- Release dates: December 28, 2001 (limited release); January 18, 2002 (U.S. release)
- Running time: 144 minutes
- Countries: United States; United Kingdom
- Language: English
- Budget: $92 million
- Box office: $173 million

Black Hawk Down is a 2001 American epic war film directed and produced by Ridley Scott, and co-produced by Jerry Bruckheimer, from a screenplay by Ken Nolan. It is based on the 1999 eponymous non-fiction book by journalist Mark Bowden, about two Black Hawk helicopters that were shot down during the Battle of Mogadishu.

The film features a large ensemble cast, including Josh Hartnett, Eric Bana, Ewan McGregor, Tom Sizemore, William Fichtner, Jason Isaacs, Sam Shepard, Jeremy Piven, Ioan Gruffudd, Ewen Bremner, Hugh Dancy, and Tom Hardy in his first film role. Orlando Bloom, Ty Burrell, and Nikolaj Coster-Waldau also have minor roles.

Black Hawk Down was produced by Columbia Pictures, Revolution Studios, Jerry Bruckheimer Films and Scott Free Productions and distributed by Sony Pictures Releasing. The film had a limited release on December 28, 2001, and went into the public on January 18, 2002. It received positive reviews from film critics, although it was criticized for inaccuracies, and performed modestly well at the box office, grossing $173 million worldwide against a production budget of $92 million. Black Hawk Down won two Academy Awards for Best Film Editing and Best Sound at the 74th Academy Awards.

== Plot ==
In 1992, a famine in southern Somalia induced by the civil war leads the United Nations Security Council to authorize a military operation with a peacekeeping mandate. Conflict ensues between UNOSOM II and the Mogadishu-based militia loyal to Mohamed Farrah Aidid. In response, U.S. President Clinton deploys Task Force Ranger—consisting of 3rd Battalion/75th Ranger Regiment, Delta Force operators, and flight crew of the 160th SOAR—to Mogadishu to capture Aidid, who has proclaimed himself president. Aidid's militia attacks a Red Cross food distribution shipment and steals the aid, but the Rangers are unable to respond due to the rules of engagement.

Outside Mogadishu, Rangers and Delta Force capture Osman Ali Atto, a faction leader selling arms to Aidid's militia. The U.S. plans a mission to capture Omar Salad Elmi and Abdi Hassan Awale Qeybdiid, two of Aidid's top advisers.

Prior to the mission, Staff Sergeant Matthew Eversmann receives his first command of Ranger Chalk Four after his lieutenant has a seizure. Members of his chalk include fresh 18-year-old Private First Class Todd Blackburn and Specialist John Grimes, a former desk clerk.

Delta Force operators capture Aidid's advisers inside the target building while the Rangers and helicopters escorting the ground convoy take heavy fire from the rallying militia. Blackburn is severely injured when he falls from one of the Black Hawk helicopters, so three Humvees led by Staff Sergeant Jeff Struecker are detached from the convoy to return Blackburn to the UN-held Mogadishu Airport. Grimes is separated from Eversmann's chalk after surviving an RPG explosion.

Just after Struecker's column departs, Black Hawk Super Six-One, piloted by Chief Warrant Officer Clifton "Elvis" Wolcott, is shot down by a rocket-propelled grenade. Wolcott and his co-pilot are killed, two crew chiefs are wounded, and two Delta Force snipers on board escape in an MH-6 Little Bird helicopter.

The ground forces are rerouted to converge on the crash site. The militia erects roadblocks preventing Lieutenant Colonel Danny McKnight's Humvee column from reaching the area and inflicts heavy casualties. Meanwhile, two Ranger chalks, including Eversmann's unit, reach the crash site and set up a defensive perimeter, while another helicopter, Super Six-Four piloted by Chief Warrant Officer Michael Durant, is also shot down by a rocket-propelled grenade and crashes several blocks away.

With the primary Ranger forces led by Captain Mike Steele pinned down and sustaining heavy casualties, no ground forces can reach Super Six-Four or reinforce the Rangers defending Super Six-One. Two Delta Force snipers, Sergeant First Class Randy Shughart and Master Sergeant Gary Gordon, volunteer to be inserted by helicopter to secure Super Six-Four's crash site, where they find Durant still alive. Despite their heroic actions the site is overrun, Gordon and Shughart are killed, and Durant is captured.

McKnight's column relinquishes their attempt to reach Six-One's crash site and returns to base with the prisoners and their casualties. The men prepare to go back to extract the Rangers and fallen pilots, and Major General Garrison asks for reinforcements from the 10th Mountain Division, including Malaysian troops and Pakistani armored units from the U.N. coalition.

As night falls, Aidid's militia launches a sustained assault on the trapped Americans at Super Six-One's crash site. The militants are held off throughout the night by strafing runs and rocket attacks from AH-6J Little Bird helicopter gunships until the 10th Mountain Division's relief column is able to reach the American soldiers. The wounded and casualties are evacuated in the vehicles, but a few Rangers and Delta Force soldiers are forced to run on foot from the crash site to reach the Safe Zone at Mogadishu Stadium.

A textual epilogue reveals Durant was released following 11 days of captivity; Gordon and Shughart became the first soldiers to receive the Medal of Honor posthumously since the Vietnam War; General Garrison took full responsibility for the mission's outcome, retiring on August 3, 1996, the day after Aidid was killed in a clash with forces of former Somali allies.

== Cast ==
=== 75th Ranger Regiment ===
- Josh Hartnett as SSG Matt Eversmann
- Ewan McGregor as SPC John "Grimesey" Grimes (based on SPC John Stebbins)
- Tom Sizemore as LTC Danny McKnight
- Ewen Bremner as SPC Shawn Nelson
- Gabriel Casseus as SPC Mike Kurth
- Hugh Dancy as SFC Kurt "Doc" Schmid
- Ioan Gruffudd as LT John Beales
- Tom Guiry as SGT Ed Yurek
- Charlie Hofheimer as CPL Jamie Smith
- Danny Hoch as SGT Dominick Pilla
- Jason Isaacs as CPT Mike Steele
- Brendan Sexton III as PVT Richard "Alphabet" Kowalewski
- Brian Van Holt as SSG Jeff Struecker
- Ian Virgo as PFC John Waddell
- Tom Hardy as SPC Lance Twombly
- Gregory Sporleder as SGT Scott Galentine
- Carmine Giovinazzo as SGT Mike Goodale
- Chris Beetem as SGT Casey Joyce
- Tac Fitzgerald as SPC Brad Thomas
- Matthew Marsden as SPC Dale "Adonis" Sizemore
- Orlando Bloom as PFC Todd Blackburn
- Enrique Murciano as SGT Lorenzo Ruiz
- Michael Roof as PVT John Maddox
- Kent Linville as PFC Clay Othic
- Norman Campbell Rees as LT Tom DiTomasso
- Corey Johnson as US Army medic in Pakistan stadium

=== Delta Force ===
- Sam Shepard as MG William F. Garrison
- Eric Bana as SFC Norm "Hoot" Gibson (based on SFC John Macejunas, SFC Norm Hooten, and SFC Matthew Rierson)
- William Fichtner as SFC Jeff Sanderson (based on SFC Paul R. Howe)
- Kim Coates as MSG Chris Wex (based on MSG Tim "Griz" Martin)
- Steven Ford as LTC Joe Cribbs (based on LTC Lee Van Arsdale)
- Željko Ivanek as LTC Gary L. Harrell
- Johnny Strong as SFC Randy Shughart
- Nikolaj Coster-Waldau as MSG Gary Gordon
- Richard Tyson as SSG Daniel Busch

=== 160th SOAR "Night Stalkers" ===
- Ron Eldard as CW4 Michael Durant, pilot of Super 64
- Glenn Morshower as COL Thomas Matthews, commander of 1st Battalion, 160th SOAR
- Jeremy Piven as CW4 Clifton Wolcott, pilot of Super 61
- Boyd Kestner as CW3 Mike Goffena, pilot of Super 62
- Pavel Vokoun as CW3 Donovan "Bull" Briley, co-pilot of Super 61
- Jason Hildebrandt as CW3 Dan Jollota, pilot of Super 68
- Keith Jones as himself, co-pilot of Star 41

=== Miscellaneous ===
- George Harris as Osman Atto
- Razaaq Adoti as Yousuf Dahir Mo'Alim, the main commander of Aidid's militia in the film
- Treva Etienne as Firimbi, propaganda minister for Aidid and Durant's caretaker
- Ty Burrell as United States Air Force Pararescue TSgt Timothy A. Wilkinson
- Dan Woods as United States Air Force Pararescue MSgt Scott C. Fales
- Giannina Facio as Stephanie Shughart, wife of Randy Shughart

== Production ==
=== Development ===
Adapting Black Hawk Down: a Story of Modern War (1999) by Mark Bowden was the idea of director Simon West, who suggested to Jerry Bruckheimer that he should buy the film rights and let West direct. West felt too tired after working on Lara Croft: Tomb Raider (2001), so he decided to drop out (West later said that he regretted the decision). Ridley Scott was hired to direct the film after he decided to not work on Terminator 3: Rise of the Machines (2003).

Ken Nolan was credited as screenwriter, and others contributed uncredited: Mark Bowden wrote an adaptation of his own book, Stephen Gaghan was hired to do a rewrite, Steven Zaillian and Ezna Sands rewrote the majority of Gaghan and Nolan's work, actor Sam Shepard (MGen. Garrison) rewrote some of his own dialogue, and Eric Roth wrote Josh Hartnett and Eric Bana's concluding speeches. Ken Nolan was on set for four months rewriting his script and the previous work by Gaghan, Zaillian, and Bowden. He was given sole screenwriting credit by a WGA committee.

The book relied on a dramatization of participant accounts, which were the basis of the movie. SPC John Stebbins was renamed as fictional "John Grimes." Stebbins had been convicted by court martial in 1999 for the rape and forcible sodomy of his six-year-old daughter. Mark Bowden said the Pentagon, ever sensitive about public image, decided to alter factual history by requesting the change. Bowden wrote early screenplay drafts, before Bruckheimer gave it to screenwriter Nolan. The POW-captor conversation, between pilot Mike Durant and militiaman Firimbi, is from a Bowden script draft.

To keep the film at a manageable length, 100 key figures in the book were condensed to 39. The movie also does not feature any Somali actors. Additionally, no Somali consultants were hired for accuracy, according to writer Bowden.

For military verisimilitude, the Ranger actors took a one-week Ranger familiarization course at Fort Benning, the Delta Force actors took a two-week commando course from the 1st Special Warfare Training Group at Fort Bragg, and Ron Eldard and the actors playing 160th SOAR helicopter pilots were lectured by captured aviator Michael Durant at Fort Campbell.

The U.S. Army supplied the materiel and the helicopters from the 160th Special Operations Aviation Regiment. Most pilots (e.g., Keith Jones, who speaks some dialogue) had participated in the historic battle on October 3–4, 1993.

On the last day of their week-long Army Ranger orientation at Fort Benning, the actors who portrayed the Rangers received letters slipped under their doors. It thanked them for their hard work, and asked them to "tell our story true", signed with the names of the men who died in the Mogadishu firefight. A platoon of Rangers from B-3/75 did the fast-roping scenes and appeared as extras; John Collette, a Ranger Specialist during the battle, served as a stunt performer.

Many of the actors bonded with the soldiers who trained them for their roles. Actor Tom Sizemore said, "What really got me at training camp was the Ranger Creed. I don't think most of us can understand that kind of mutual devotion. It's like having 200 best friends and every single one of them would die for you".

The film was originally set up at Disney's Touchstone Pictures label, but Disney boss Peter Schneider placed the film into turnaround, citing its subject matter, and sold the project to Revolution Studios.

=== Filming ===
Filming began in March 2001 in Kénitra, Morocco, and concluded in late June.

Although the filmmakers considered filming in Jordan, they found the city of Amman too built up and landlocked. Scott and production designer Arthur Max subsequently turned to Morocco, where they had previously worked on Gladiator. Scott preferred that urban setting for authenticity. Most of the film was photographed in the cities of Rabat and Salé; the Task Force Ranger base sequences were filmed at Kénitra and Mehdya.

=== Music ===
The musical score for Black Hawk Down was composed by Hans Zimmer, who previously collaborated with director Scott on several films including Thelma & Louise (1991) and Gladiator (2000). Zimmer developed the score through a collaboration with a variety of musicians that blended "east African rhythms and sounds with a more conventional synthesizer approach." In doing so, Zimmer avoided a more traditional composition in favor of an experimental approach that would match the tone of the film. "I wanted to do it like the way the movie was," said Zimmer. "So I got myself a band together and we just went into my studio [...] and we'd just be flailing away at the picture, I mean, you know with great energy." A soundtrack album was released on January 15, 2002, by Decca Records. Included on the soundtrack was the Moby track Why Does My Heart Feel So Bad? which was used in the film's worldwide trailer.

== Release ==
Black Hawk Down had a very limited release in four theaters on December 28, 2001, in order to be eligible for the 2001 Oscars, staying at that number for its first two weeks. The film's release expanded on January 11, 2002, to 16 theaters for its third week; over its first three weeks, running on fewer than 20 screens throughout that period. A wide release commenced on January 18. The film's Washington, D.C. premiere at the Uptown Theater was attended by Vice President Dick Cheney, Secretary of Defense Donald Rumsfeld, and several military personnel and veterans.

In 2006, an extended cut of the film was released on DVD. The cut contains an additional eight minutes of footage, increasing the running time to 152 minutes. This extended cut was released on Blu-ray and in 4K in May 2019.

== Reception ==
=== Box office ===
Black Hawk Down collected $179,823 from its limited release on December 28, 2001. The film later earned $748,459 from its expanded release on January 11, 2002. It grossed a total of $28.6 million at 3,101 theaters in its first wide-release weekend, placing it No. 1 at the box office. The film finished No. 1 at the box office during its first three weeks of wide release, part of a consecutive five weeks in the Top 10. Black Hawk Down went on to gross $108.6 million domestically and $64.4 million overseas, for a worldwide total of $173 million, against a $92 million budget.

=== Critical response ===
On the review aggregator website Rotten Tomatoes, 76% of 174 critics' reviews are positive, with an average rating of 7.0/10. The website's consensus reads: "Though it's light on character development and cultural empathy, Black Hawk Down is a visceral, pulse-pounding portrait of war, elevated by Ridley Scott's superb technical skill." Metacritic, which uses a weighted average, assigned the film a score of 74 out of 100, based on 33 critics, indicating "generally favorable" reviews. Audiences polled by CinemaScore gave the film an average grade of "A−" on an A+ to F scale.

Roger Ebert of the Chicago Sun-Times gave the film four stars out of four, saying that films like this "help audiences understand and sympathize with the actual experiences of combat troops, instead of trivializing them into entertainments." Empire magazine said that, though "ambitious, sumptuously framed, and frenetic, Black Hawk Down is nonetheless a rare find of a war movie which dares to turn genre convention on its head".

Mike Clark of USA Today wrote that the film "extols the sheer professionalism of America's elite Delta Force—even in the unforeseen disaster that was 1993's Battle of Mogadishu," and praised Scott's direction: "in relating the conflict, in which 18 Americans died and 70-plus were injured, the standard getting-to-know-you war-film characterizations are downplayed. While some may regard this as a shortcoming, it is, in fact, a virtue". Terry Lawson of Detroit Free Press stated that "except for the opening 20 minutes of Saving Private Ryan and the middle 45 of Pearl Harbor -- produced, like this film, by action overlord Jerry Bruckheimer -- no film has ever dropped us so convincingly into combat."

The film has had a small cultural legacy, which has been studied academically by media analysts dissecting how media reflects American perceptions of war. Newsweek writer Evan Thomas considered the movie one of the most culturally significant films of the George W. Bush presidency. He suggested that, although the film was presented as being anti-war, it was at its core pro-war: "though it depicted a shameful defeat, the soldiers were heroes willing to die for their brothers in arms ... The movie showed brutal scenes of killing, but also courage, stoicism and honor ... The overall effect was stirring, if slightly pornographic, and it seemed to enhance the desire of Americans for a thumping war to avenge 9/11."

Stephen A. Klien, writing in Critical Studies in Media Communication, argued that the film's sensational rendering of war encouraged audiences to empathize with the film's pro-soldier leitmotif, to "conflate personal support of American soldiers with support of American military policy," and to discourage "critical public discourse concerning justification for and execution of military interventionist policy."

In a review featured in The New York Times, film critic Elvis Mitchell expressed dissatisfaction with the film's "lack of characterization" and opined that the film "reeks of glumly staged racism". Owen Gleiberman and Sean Burns, the film critics for Entertainment Weekly and the alternative newspaper Philadelphia Weekly, respectively, echoed the sentiment that the depiction was racist. American film critic Wheeler Winston Dixon also found the film's "absence of motivation and characterization" disturbing, and wrote that while American audiences might find the film to be a "paean to patriotism", other audiences might find it to be a "deliberately hostile enterprise"; nevertheless, Dixon lauded the film's "spectacular display of pyrotechnics coupled with equally adroit editing." Jerry Bruckheimer, the film's producer, rejected these criticisms on The O'Reilly Factor, putting them down to political correctness in part due to Hollywood's liberal leanings.

=== Accolades ===
Black Hawk Down received four Academy Award nominations: for Best Director (lost to A Beautiful Mind), Best Cinematography (lost to The Lord of the Rings: The Fellowship of the Ring), and won two Oscars for Best Sound and Best Film Editing. It received three BAFTA Award nominations for Best Cinematography, Best Sound and Best Editing.

Award	Category	Nominee	Result	Ref.
Academy Awards	Best Director	Ridley Scott	Nominated	
Academy Awards	Best Cinematography	Sławomir Idziak	Nominated	
Academy Awards	Best Film Editing	Pietro Scalia	Won	
Academy Awards	Best Sound	Michael Minkler; Myron Nettinga; Chris Munro	Won	
BAFTA Award	Best Cinematography	Slawomir Idziak	Nominated	
BAFTA Award	Best Editing	Pietro Scalia	Nominated	
BAFTA Award	Best Sound	Chris Munro; Per Hallberg; Michael Minkler; Myron Nettinga; Karen Baker Landers	Nominated	
AFI Award	Cinematographer of the Year	Slawomir Idziak	Nominated	
AFI Award	Director of the Year	Ridley Scott	Nominated	
AFI Award	Editor of the Year	Pietro Scalia	Nominated	
AFI Award	Movie of the Year	Jerry Bruckheimer; Ridley Scott	Nominated	
AFI Award	Production Designer of the Year	Arthur Max	Nominated	
NBR Award	Top Ten Films		Won	
Saturn Award	Best Action/Adventure/Thriller Film		Nominated	
Saturn Award	Best DVD Special Edition Release		Nominated	
Eddie Award	Best Edited Feature Film – Dramatic	Pietro Scalia	Won	
ADG Excellence in Production; Design Award	Contemporary Film	Keith Pain; Marco Trentini; Gianni Giovagnoni; Cliff Robinson; Pier Luigi Basile; Ivo Husnjak; Arthur Max	Nominated	
Harry Award			Won	
Golden Reel Award	Best Sound Editing – Dialogue and ADR in a Feature Film	Per Hallberg; Karen Baker Landers; Chris Jargo; Mark L. Mangino; Chris Hogan	Won	
Golden Reel Award	Best Sound Editing – Effects & Foley, Domestic Feature Film	Per Hallberg; Karen Baker Landers; Craig S. Jaeger; Jon Title; Christopher Assells; Dino Dimuro; Dan Hegeman; Michael A. Reagan; Gregory Hainer; Perry Robertson; Peter Staubli; Bruce Tanis; Michael Hertlein; Solange S. Schwalbe	Won	
Plus Camerimage	Golden Frog	Slawomir Idziak	Nominated	
Cinema Audio Society Award	Outstanding Sound Mixing for Motion Pictures	Michael Minkler; Myron Nettinga; Chris Munro	Nominated	
Directors Guild of America Award	Outstanding Directorial Achievement in Motion Pictures	Ridley Scott	Nominated	
Golden Trailer Award	Best Drama	Trailer Park, Inc.	Nominated	
MTV Movie Award	Best Movie		Nominated	
MTV Movie Award	Best Action Sequence	First helicopter crash	Nominated	
Phoenix Film Critics Society Award	Best Acting Ensemble	Eric Bana; Ewen Bremner; William Fichtner; Josh Hartnett; Jason Isaacs; Ewan McGregor; Sam Shepard; Tom Sizemore	Nominated	
Phoenix Film Critics Society Award	Best Cinematography	Slawomir Idziak	Nominated	
Phoenix Film Critics Society Award	Best Film Editing	Pietro Scalia	Nominated	
Teen Choice Award	Choice Movie Actor: Action/Drama	Josh Hartnett	Nominated	
Teen Choice Award	Choice Movie: Action/Drama		Nominated	
World Soundtrack Award	Best Original Soundtrack of the Year	Hans Zimmer	Nominated	
World Soundtrack Award	Soundtrack Composer of the Year	Hans Zimmer	Nominated	
Writers Guild of America Award	Best Screenplay Based on Material; Previously Produced or Published	Ken Nolan	Nominated	
ASCAP Award	Top Box Office Films	Hans Zimmer (also for The Ring)	Won	
DVD Exclusive Award	Best Overall DVD, New Movie (Including All Extra Features)	Charles de Lauzirika (Deluxe Edition)	Nominated	

== Historicity ==
In a radio interview, Brendan Sexton, who portrayed Ranger Richard "Alphabet" Kowalewski, said that the version that made it onto theater screens significantly differed from the one recounted in the original script. According to him, many scenes asking hard questions of the US regarding the violent realities of war and the true purpose of their mission in Somalia were cut.

The film begins with the quote "Only the dead have seen the end of war.", which is misattributed to Plato. This line first appeared in the works of George Santayana.

=== Depiction of Somalis ===
Soon after Black Hawk Down's release, the Somali Justice Advocacy Center (SJAC) in California denounced what they felt was its brutal and dehumanizing depiction of Somalis and called for its boycott. The SJAC in Minnesota called for a boycott of the film for its portrayal of Somalis as "savage beasts shooting each other." No Somali actors were used in the movie. Somalis attending a screening of a pirated copy of the film at a theater in Mogadishu said the film ignored the deaths of hundreds, if not thousands, of civilian adults and children caused by the Americans.

In a 2002 interview with the BBC, the faction leader Osman Ali Atto said that many aspects of the film are factually incorrect. Taking exception to the ostentatious depiction of his character, Ali Atto claimed he looks nothing like the actor who portrayed him, nor that he smoked cigars or wore earrings. These details were later confirmed by SEAL Team Six sniper Howard E. Wasdin in his 2012 memoirs. Wasdin indicated that while the character in the movie ridiculed his captors, in reality, Atto seemed concerned that Wasdin and his men had been sent to kill rather than apprehend him. Atto stated that he had not been consulted about the project, nor was he approached for permission to use his likeness, and that the film sequence re-enacting his arrest contained several inaccuracies:

First of all when I was caught on 21 September, I was only travelling with one Fiat 124, not three vehicles as it shows in the film[...] And when the helicopter attacked, people were hurt, people were killed[...] The car we were travelling in, (and) I have got proof, it was hit at least 50 times. And my colleague Ahmed Ali was injured on both legs[...] I think it was not right, the way they portrayed both the individual and the action. It was not right.

Wasdin remarked that while olive green military rigger's tape was used to mark the roof of the car in question in the movie, his team in actuality managed to track down Atto's whereabouts using a much more sophisticated technique involving the implantation of a homing device. This was hidden in a cane presented to Atto as a gift from a contact who routinely met with him, which eventually led the team directly to the faction leader.

=== Uncredited UN troops ===
Retired Malaysian Army Brigadier-General Abdul Latif Ahmad, who at the time commanded Malaysian forces in Mogadishu, told the AFP news agency that Malaysian moviegoers would be under the erroneous impression that the real battle was fought by the Americans alone, with Malaysian troops (including Cpl Mat Aznan Awang, recipient of the Grand Knight of Valour, Malaysia's highest award, killed when his was one of four Malaysian APCs destroyed during the battle) relegated to serving as "mere bus drivers to ferry them out".

General Pervez Musharraf, who later became President of Pakistan after a coup, similarly accused the filmmakers of not crediting the work done by the Pakistani soldiers. In his autobiography In the Line of Fire: A Memoir, Musharraf wrote:

The outstanding performance of the Pakistani troops under adverse conditions is very well known at the UN. Regrettably, the film Black Hawk Down ignores the role of Malaysia and Pakistan in Somalia. When U.S. troops were trapped in the thickly populated Madina Bazaar area of Mogadishu, it was the Seventh Frontier Force Regiment of the Pakistan Army that reached out and extricated them. The bravery of the U.S. troops notwithstanding, we deserved equal, if not more, credit; but the filmmakers depicted the incident as involving only Americans.

=== Mogadishu Mile ===
It is often believed that the soldiers involved in the Mogadishu Mile had to run all the way to the Mogadiscio Stadium, as shown in the film. In that scene the filmmakers took artistic license and dramatized the event, departing from the book. In the film, the Mogadishu Mile ends with about a dozen soldiers entering the Mogadiscio Stadium having run all the way through the city. In the book, it ends with soldiers reaching a rendezvous point on National Street, in the opposite direction from the stadium:

"As he [75th Rangers SGT Randy Ramaglia] approached the intersection of Hawlwadig Road and National Street, about five blocks south of the Olympic Hotel, he saw a tank and the line of APCs and Humvees and a mass of men in desert battle dress. He ran until he collapsed, with joy"

"These APCs were headed back about 800 meters to a strongpoint where reserve element has stayed behind with the tanks, and the plan was to move the wounded via the vehicles and the healthy by foot back to the strongpoint. That's exactly what happened. That, in all its non-dramatic form, is the so-called "Mogadishu mile"..."

== See also ==
- MALBATT: Misi Bakara (2023 film)
- Surviving Black Hawk Down (2025 TV documentary series)
- Bloody Monday raid

== Bibliography ==
- Cohen, David S. (2008). Screen Plays: How 25 Scripts Made It to a Theater Near You—For Better or Worse. New York: HarperCollins. ISBN 978-0-0611-8919-7.
