= Judge Perry =

Judge Perry may refer to:

- Belvin Perry (born 1949), chief judge of the Florida Ninth Judicial Circuit
- Catherine D. Perry (born 1952), judge of the United States District Court for the Eastern District of Missouri
- Joseph Sam Perry (1896–1984), judge of the United States District Court for the Northern District of Illinois
- Matthew J. Perry (1921–2011), judge of the United States District Court for the District of South Carolina

== See also ==
- Edward Abbott Parry (1863–1943), British judge and dramatist
- Justice Perry (disambiguation)
