= Parris Island (disambiguation) =

Parris Island most commonly refers to Marine Corps Recruit Depot Parris Island, a United States Marine Corps training facility in South Carolina.

Parris Island may also refer to:

- Parris Island, South Carolina
- USS Parris Island (AG-72), a United States Navy patrol boat
- Parris Island Museum

== See also ==
- Parris (disambiguation)
- Island of Paris
