= Perri =

Perri may refer to:

- Perri (novel) or The Youth of a Squirrel, a 1938 novel by Felix Salten
- Perri (film), a 1957 Disney film
- Perri (group), an American R&B vocal group
- Perri (name), a surname and given name
- Perri (surname)

== See also ==
- Peri (disambiguation)
- Perrie
- Perry (disambiguation)
- Pery (disambiguation)
- Porri (surname)
