= Peary, Virginia =

Unincorporated community in Virginia, US

Coordinates: 37°22′19″N 76°16′46″W

Peary is an unincorporated community in Mathews County, in the U. S. state of Virginia.
