= Fortunato N. Perri Jr. =

American lawyer

Fortunato Natale Perri Jr. is an attorney for the firm of McMonagle, Perri & McHugh, located in Philadelphia, Pennsylvania. Perri is notable for being the defense attorney representing hip hop artists Beanie Sigel and Cassidy.
