= Perrie =

Perrie is both a surname and given name, and may refer to:

- Ian Perrie (born 1979), Australian rules footballer
- Lynne Perrie (1931–2006), English actress
- Maureen Perrie (born 1946), lecturer in Russian history
- Perrie Edwards (born 1993), English singer
- Perrie Mans (born 1940), retired professional snooker player

== See also ==
- Perrie (album), by Perrie Edwards
- Pari (disambiguation)
- Peary (disambiguation)
- John Perie
- Perri (disambiguation)
- Perry (disambiguation)
- Peri (disambiguation)
- Pery (disambiguation)
- Perrie Award
