= Parry Osayande =

Nigerian police officer (1936–2025)

Deputy Inspector General of Police
- In office 1990–1992

Deputy Inspector-General of Police,Lagos State
- In office 1990–1992

Commissioner of Police, Cross River State
- In office 1988–1990

Commissioner of Police, Bendel State
- In office 1986–1987

Commissioner of Police, Benue state
- In office 1985–1986

Commissioner of Police in charge of Police Budget
- In office 1981–1985

Deputy Commissioner in charge of/Railway Police command, Lagos
- In office 1980–1981

Assistant commissioner in charge, Bendel State Criminal Investigation Department
- In office 1978–1980

Assistant commissioner in charge personnel, Force Headquarters, Lagos
- In office 1975–1978

Chief Superintendent Administration, State Headquarters Port Harcourt
- In office 1974–1975

Officer in charge, Rivers State Criminal Investigation Department (CID)
- In office 1972–1973

Divisional police, Diobu division, Rivers state
- In office 1971–1972

Divisional police, Ogoni division
- In office 1970–1971

Divisional police officer, Ahoada division
- In office 1969–1970

Divisional police officer, Lanlate division
- In office 1968–1969

Divisional police officer, Ikire division
- In office 1967–1967

Divisional police officer, Shagamu division
- In office 1966–1967

Personal details
- Born: 29 September 1936 Benin City, Colony and Protectorate of Nigeria
- Died: 28 September 2025 (aged 88) Benin City, Edo State, Nigeria
- Spouse: Irene Osayande
- Occupation: Police officer
- Awards: Commander of the Order of the Federal Republic of Nigeria (CFR), NPM, Mni; Officer of the Order of the Federal Republic

Parry Benjamin Osemwegie Osayande (29 September 1936 – 28 September 2025) was a Nigerian police officer who served as Deputy Inspector General. He was the commissioner of police of the former Bendel state during the Anini saga which terrorised Nigeria in the 1980s. Under his watch as commissioner of police in the now defunct Bendel state, Lawrence Anini, the infamous armed robber was captured and executed. In 1990, Parry Osayande directed the operations which suppressed the Bauchi religious inspired riots in which several people died. In 1992, Osayande led the Federal Government delegation to Namibia under the auspices of the United Nations Transition Assistance Group to monitor the behaviour, conduct and activities of the South West African Police and assist Namibian citizens to hold free and fair elections. Osayande retired as Deputy Inspector General of police in 1992. He was appointed by the Yar'adua administration as Chairman of the Police reforms committee in 2007/2008. He was later appointed Chairman of the Police Service Commission in 2008 by the Goodluck Jonathan administration, a position he held until 2013. Osayande served in several committees set up by the Nigerian Federal Government to reform the Police force.

== Early life and education ==
Born in Benin City on 29 September 1936 to the family of Chief Osazuwa Osayande. His father was an Agricultural Officer. His mother was Princess Ebose Eweka, a housewife. Parry Osayande schooled at the Immaculate Conception College, Benin City, between 1954 and 1958. During his career as a police officer, Osayande attended several institutions and underwent several trainings. The institutions he attended include Police College, Ikeja which he graduated from in 1960; Detective training school, Wakefield, England which he graduated from in 1962; and Police staff college, Bramshill, England which he graduated from in 1971. Other institutions attended by Osayande include Metropolitan college, Hendon, England; Police Staff College, Jos; Royal Institute of Public Administration, England and National Institute of Policy and Strategic Studies (NIPSS).

== Career in the Nigerian Police Force ==
Osayande's first appointment in the Nigerian police force was station officer of the central police station, Ibadan in 1961. In the following year, he was part of the armed force sent to contain the Agbekoya uprisings in the defunct Western region. The Agbekoya uprising constituted of people mainly from the present-day South-west geopolitical zone of Nigeria who was agitating for a reduction in taxes. These uprisings led to the death of thousands of people. In 1962, Osayande was appointed Station officer of the central police station, Benin and later that year, he was appointed staff officer at the Ogbomosho Police station. In 1964, he was made staff officer in charge of Training at the state Headquarters in Ibadan. In 1965, Osayande was drafted to the government house, Ibadan as ADC the Governor of the Western Region, Sir Odeleye Fadahunsi. Osayande held this post until the first military coup d'état in January 1965. After the military takeover, Osayande was made ADC to Lt. Col. Adekunle Fajuyi, Military Governor of the then Western Region. Between 1966 and 1972, Osayande was a Divisional Police Officer of different police divisions in several parts of the country at different intervals. Among these divisions were Ikire division, Lanlate division, Ahoada division, Ogoni division and Diobu Division. During his time as a divisional officer, Osayande went on several operation assignments including Operation (Wet ie) in the defunct western region which culminated in the 1966 coup. During the Nigerian Civil war, Osayande was drafted to the war front in Port Harcourt to take part in the police action against Col. Ojukwu's rebellion. In 1969, he was drafted to aid in the quelling of the Owo riot which led to the deposition of the Olowo of Owo, Olateru Olagbegi II. In 1974, he was made Chief Superintendent of Police at Port Harcourt, a position which lasted until 1975. Between 1975 and 1978, Osayande held the position of Assistant commissioner in charge of personnel at the Police Headquarters, Lagos. He would later become the Officer in charge of Bendel State Criminal Investigation Department between 1978 and 1980. In 1981, he was made a Deputy Commissioner of police in charge of, Railway Police command, Lagos. According to the former Inspector General of Police, Solomon Arase, "In June 1981, arising from the necessity for the Force to take ownership in the preparation, defence and utilization of its financial resources, the Nigeria Police Budget Unit was established under the headship of Retired DIG Parry Osayande, NPM, Mni, CFR, the former Chairman of Police Service Commission who was then a Commissioner of Police." Osayande held the position of Commissioner of Police in charge of Police Budget for five years. He would later become Commissioner in charge of Benue state command, Makurdi in 1985. Osayande was Commissioner of police in charge of Bendel state in 1986 and Commissioner of Police in charge of Cross River and Akwa Ibom State between 1988 and 1990. In 1990, Osayande was made Deputy Inspector-General of Police in charge of Force Operations at Lagos and later in 1992, he headed the force intelligence and investigation bureau, Lagos. During his time as Deputy Inspector General of Police, Osayande directed the operations which aimed at restoring peace to Bauchi and later on Kano. At this time, religious riots were on the rise in several parts of Northern Nigeria which led to the death of thousands of people. He was again moved as Deputy Inspector General of police to become the DIG in Charge of operations and in 1992, Osayande led a police unit to Namibia to ensure a smooth and peaceful election process in Namibia. The police unit led by Osayande was one among 41 police forces across the world which arrived Namibia for the same mission. The year 1992, marked the end of Parry Osayande's career in the Nigerian Police force. He retired from the Police force as Deputy Inspector General of Police.

=== Anini Saga ===
In the 1980s, Lawrence Anini an armed bandit terrorised the Nigerian landscape. Anini hailed from the defunct Bendel state and had a reputation for being armed and highly dangerous. Anini was falsely rumoured to have been sponsored by the Oba of Benin, Oba Erediauwa. Due to his blood relation to the Oba of Benin, Osayande was sent to Benin to arrest Anini. It was one of the earliest episodes in the history of crime detection in the Nigeria Police dating back to 1961 that crime detection became tribalised. Osayande was made Commissioner of Police in charge of Bendel State for a year and on 3 December 1986, Anini was captured. Anini's arrest team was led by a superintendent of police, Kayode Uanreroro; Gambo Jimeta, a UK-trained detective at the time, was also credited with the success of the operation.

== Post-retirement ==
After Osayande's retirement in 1992, he continuously made several recommendations when necessary to the Nigerian Federal Government on Police reform. In 2007 under the Shehu Musa Yar'adua administration he was made Chairman of the police reforms committee and in 2008, under the president Goodluck Jonathan Administration, Osayande was made chairman of the Police service Commission, a position he held until 2013. Between 2008 and 2013, Osayande chaired several Committees aimed at the reorganisation of the Nigeria Police Force.

== Personal life and death ==
Osayande was married to Irene Amayo, and they had five children. Osayande died on 28 September 2025, at the age of 88.

== Honours and awards ==
Osayande received several awards for his service to Nigeria. Among his awards include the Commander of the Federal republic of Nigeria (CFR), Officer of the order of the Niger (OFR) Nigerian Police Medal (NPM); Fellow of the Royal Institute of Public Administration, England (RIPA), Officer of the City of Atmore, USA; Member of the National Institute (MNI) and Distinguished Citizen of Edo state.

== Bibliography ==
- Otobo, Dafe (2016), Reforms and Nigerian labour and employment relations : perspectives, issues and challenges, Lagos: Malthouse Press OCLC 1141878665
- Ero, Adekunbi (26 April 2022), Parry Osayande slams Buhari over state pardon granted two corrupt ex-govs, Tell Magazine
- Arase, Solomon (20 June 2016), Speech by the inspector-general of police igp solomon e. Arase npm, fdc, on the occasion of the official commissioning of the nigeria police finance building, force headquarters abuja on 20th june, 20, Nigeria Police Force
- Owolabi, Femi (22 January 2021), OBITUARY: Gambo Jimeta, the UK-trained detective who nabbed notorious robber, Anini, weeks after appointment as IGP, TheCable
- Marenin, Otwin (1987). "The Anini Saga: Armed Robbery and the Reproduction of Ideology in Nigeria". The Journal of Modern African Studies. 25 (2): 259–281.
- Ajani, Jide (3 August 2013), ANINI THE LAW: A robber's robber, Vanguard (Nigeria)
- Babalola, Ademola (2 November 2019), How a gunshot Triggered violent Agbekoya revolt –Akekaaka, Yoruba Solidarity Movement leader, The Punch
- Higazi, Adam, The Jos Crisis: A recurrent Nigerian tragedy (PDF), Friedrich-Ebert-Stiftung
- Kingpins: The Story of Nigeria's most Notorious Armed Robbers : Episode 6 – Lawrence Anini, 15 April 2021
- Onoja, Esa (2013). "The relationship between the constitutional right to silence and confessions in Nigeria". African Journal of Legal Studies. 6: 189–211.
- OSAYANDE, DIG, Parry (rtd.), 8 March 2017
- Aliu, Ozioruva (23 March 2022), How multiple security agencies hurt Police performance — Osayande, Vanguard (Nigeria)
- Presidency appoints new Inspector General of Police, raises panel to reorganise police, Premium Times, 25 January 2012
- Nwezeh, Kingsley; Nworie, Benjamin (13 April 2021), Nigeria's Southeast Governors Plan Legal Backing for 'Regional Police', Arise News
