= Justice Perry =

Justice Perry may refer to:

- Antonio Perry (1871–1944), associate justice of the Hawaii Territorial Supreme Court
- James E. C. Perry (born 1944), associate justice of the Florida Supreme Court
- John C. Perry (1832–1884), appointed chief justice of the Supreme Court of Wyoming Territory who died before assuming office
- Melissa Perry (judge) (fl. 1990s–2020s), associate justice of the Federal Court of Australia
- Sion L. Perry (c. 1793–1874), associate justice of the Alabama Supreme Court
- Thomas Erskine Perry (1806–1882), chief justice of the supreme court in Bombay during the British rule of India
- William C. Perry (1900–1985), associate justice of the Oregon Supreme Court

== See also ==
- Judge Perry (disambiguation)
