= Porro, Kenya =

Porro is one of many valleys that seat on the floor of the Great Rift Valley in Kenya. It is located a few kilometers outside Maralal at an estimated altitude of 2,512 meters (8,241 ft), and has made this town a tourist destination for its characteristic drylands, rock massifs and view of the Great Rift Valley escarpments.

During the short rains, Porro Valley transforms the Great Northern Wilderness into a green expanse of cedar trees
