= Mogadishu Mile =

Somali route used by US troops in 1993

The Mogadishu Mile was a route that was taken by United States Army Rangers and Delta Force soldiers from a UH-60 helicopter crash site to an appointed rally point held by the 10th Mountain Division on National Street during the Battle of Mogadishu on October 4, 1993. The U.S. soldiers involved were part of Task Force Ranger, an attempt to seize two lieutenants of warlord Mohamed Farrah Aidid. Originally they were supposed to take cover by running alongside a convoy of Humvees and armored personnel carriers, however when the convoy failed to understand that the vehicles were needed for cover, they left them and the soldiers were forced to run without support and with very little ammunition.

The Mogadishu Mile began at 05:42 a.m. and ended when all the troops exfiltrated to the rendezvous point and were loaded into APCs and Humvees, reaching either the Pakistani stadium or the Airport by 06:30 a.m. During the run, the convoy and in particular the soldiers on foot were attacked with rocket-propelled grenades and small-arms fire, wounding several soldiers including Sgt. Randy Ramaglia. Many soldiers were suffering from sleep deprivation and dehydration.

== Black Hawk Down film inaccuracies ==
It is often believed that the soldiers involved in the Mogadishu Mile had to run all the way to the Mogadishu Stadium, as it was shown in the 2001 film Black Hawk Down. However, in that scene the filmmakers took artistic license and dramatized the event, departing from the original Black Hawk Down: A Story of Modern War book by Mark Bowden. In the film, the Mogadishu Mile ends with about a dozen soldiers entering the Mogadishu Stadium having run all the way through the city. In the book, it ends with soldiers reaching a rendezvous point on National Street (in opposite direction to the stadium):

"As he approached the intersection of Hawlwadig Road and National Street, about five blocks south of the Olympic Hotel, he saw a tank and the line of APCs and Humvees and a mass of men in desert battle dress. He ran until he collapsed, with joy."

Not only the Rangers and Delta Force soldiers made the Mogadishu Mile, but also soldiers from U.S. 10th Mountain Division alongside them:

"We didn't ride off the crash site. We didn't run out. We walked expediently in a tactical formation for about a mile to get to an awaiting convoy."

On the whole, the film version where the convoy leaves the soldiers running through the city alone does not correspond to the real event:

"No one ran out of the city. The Mog mile was to a rally point where the Pakistani tanks and the vehicles from 10th Mountain were, waiting to take the men of TFR out to the Pakistani stadium."

"These APCs were headed back about 800 meters to a strongpoint where reserve element has stayed behind with the tanks, and the plan was to move the wounded via the vehicles and the healthy by foot back to the strongpoint. That's exactly what happened. That, in all its non-dramatic form, is the so-called "Mogadishu mile"..."

However, this account contradicts that of Clayton K.S. Chun, Chair of the United States Army War College, who claims that in the last few panicked minutes of the battle, with the convoy operating in a long column with staggered stops and starts, some vehicles ended up making a dash to Mogadishu Stadium, accidentally leaving behind soldiers and forcing them to trek on foot.
