= Pari, Raebareli =

Pari Pāri
- Village
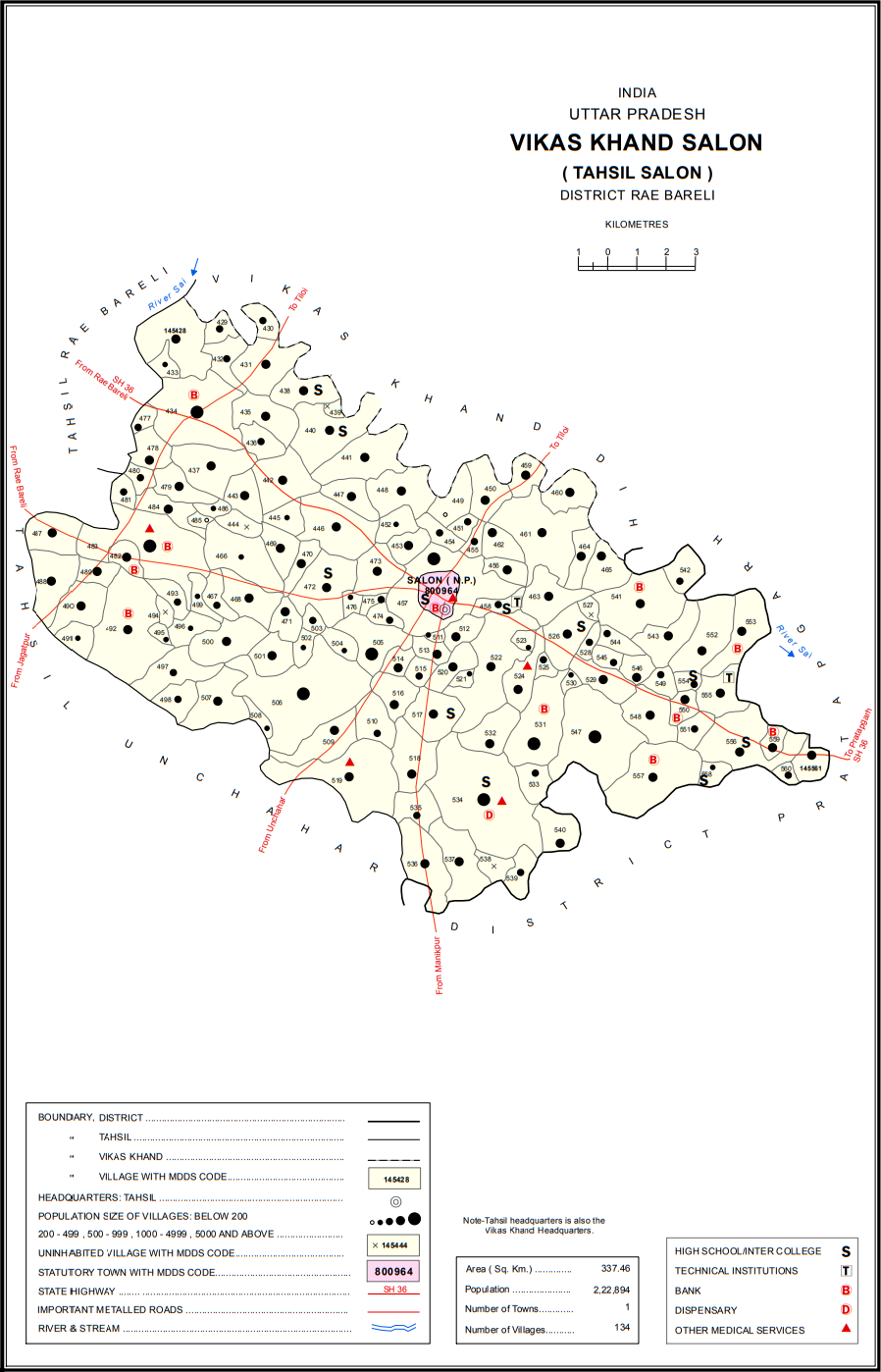
- Map showing Pari (#483) in Salon CD block

- Location in Uttar Pradesh, India
- Coordinates: 26.041788°N 81.350378°E
- Country India: India
- State: Uttar Pradesh
- District: Raebareli

Area
  - Total: 744.8 km^{2} (287.6 sq mi)

Population (2011)
  - Total: 7,060
  - Density: 9.48/km^{2} (24.6/sq mi)

Languages
  - Official: Hindi
- Time zone: UTC+5:30 (IST)
- PIN: 229401
- Vehicle registration: UP-35

Pari is a village in Salon block of Rae Bareli district, Uttar Pradesh, India. It is located 27 km from Raebareli, the district headquarters. As of 2011, Pari has a population of 7,060 people, in 1,283 households. It has one primary school and one maternity and child welfare centre, as well as a post office, an Anganwadi centre, and an agricultural credit society. The village hosts a market twice per week, on Mondays and Fridays; grain and vegetables are the main items traded.

The 1961 census recorded Pari as comprising 12 hamlets, with a total population of 2,991 people (1,488 male and 1,503 female), in 645 households and 598 physical houses. The area of the village was given as 1,901 acres and it had a post office at that point. Average attendance of the twice-weekly market was about 75 people then.

The 1981 census recorded Pari as having a population of 3,952 people, in 972 households, and having an area of 769.32 hectares. The main staple foods were given as wheat and rice.
