= Perry Robertson =

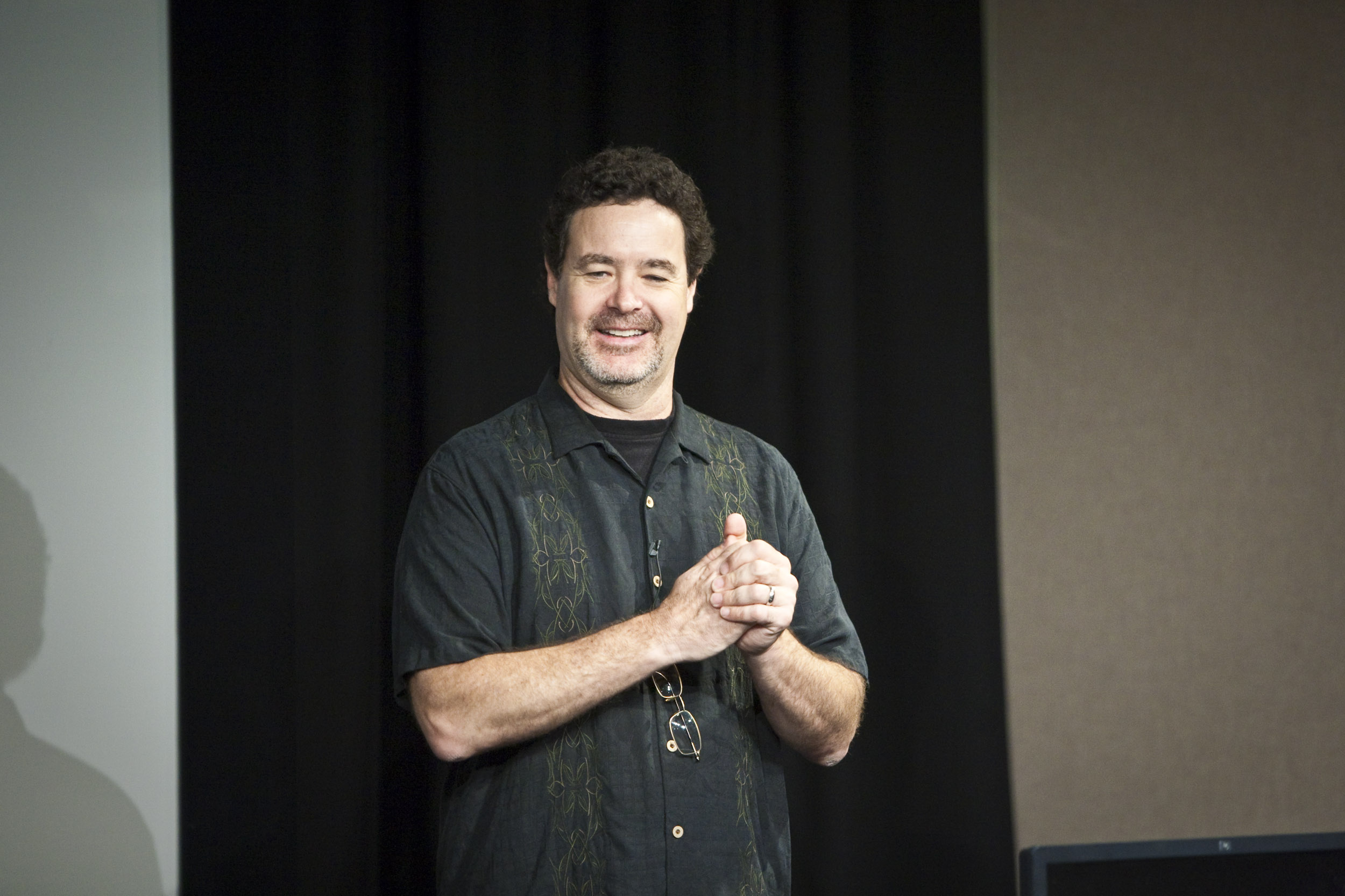
- Robertson in 2010
- Occupation(s): Sound editor, musician, composer
- Years active: 1985–present
- Notable work: Black Hawk Down, The Bourne Identity, Open Range

Perry Robertson is an American sound editor, supervising sound editor, sound mixer, composer and musician, who is known for doing major motion pictures such as Black Hawk Down, Juno, The Bourne Identity, Up in the Air, Rambo and Thank You For Smoking.

Robertson has contributed to over 100 major movie productions, as well as to some TV and Direct-to-video productions. In 2002 he won the Golden Reel Award for Black Hawk Down (Best Sound Editing – Effects & Foley, Domestic Feature Film). In 2003 as well as in 2004 he was nominated for another two Golden Reel Awards, for The Bourne Identity and for Open Range (both Best Sound Editing in Domestic Features – Sound Effects & Foley).

He lives in Los Angeles and is the guitarist of the blues rock band Kelly's Lot, with whom he occasionally also tours Europe. They released several albums.
