= Political Economy of Research and Innovation =

The Political Economy of Research and Innovation (PERI) (or sometimes political economy of technoscience) is an emerging academic field at the interface of science and technology studies and political economy. It focuses on the production, distribution, and consumption of knowledge, and how these shape and are shaped by different political economies. Most scholars in this field have so-far focused on the two-way relationship between science, technology, and innovation and political economic processes, practices, and logics.

It has its origins in the critique of neoclassical or orthodox economics of science by scholars like Philip Mirowski, the 'economic turn' in science and technology studies (see social studies of finance and valuation studies), and innovation studies or science policy.

Examples of the field include:

- An annual Changing Political Economy of Research and Innovation (CPERI) workshop which has been held in Lancaster (UK 2012), Toronto (Canada 2013), San Diego (USA 2015), Liege (Belgium 2016), Boston (USA 2017), and Lancaster (UK 2018).
- Programmatic handbooks like The Routledge Handbook of the Political Economy of Science (2017, edited by David Tyfield, Rebecca Lave, Samuel Randalls, and Charles Thorpe) and Critical Studies of Innovation (2017, edited by Benoît Godin and Dominique Vinck) published by Edward Elgar.
- Special issues of academic journals.
- Graduate courses in science and technology studies programs.[1]
