= Moriusaq =

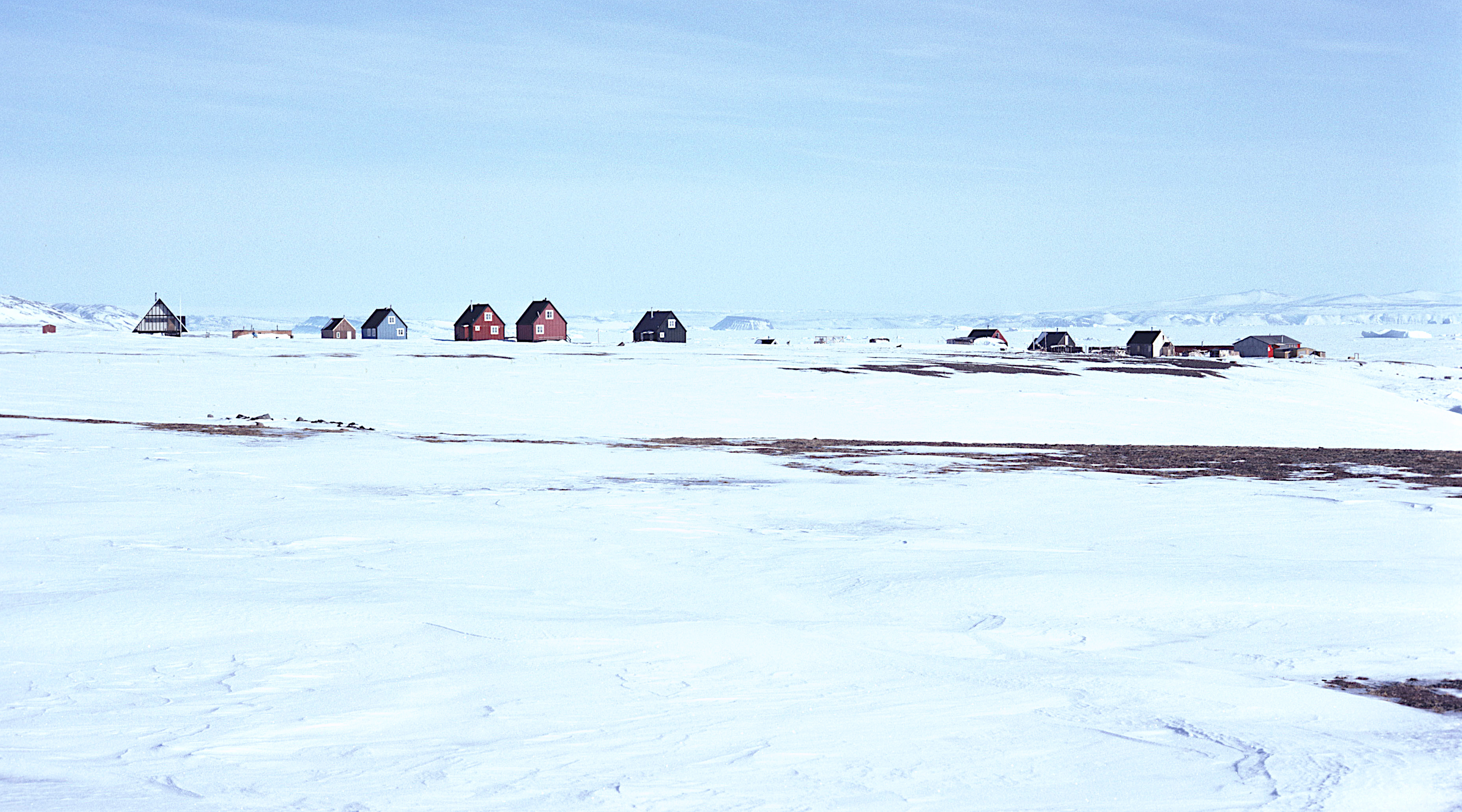
- Moriusaq in 1979

- Location within Greenland
- Coordinates: 76°45′03″N 69°50′55″W
- Sovereign state: Kingdom of Denmark
- Autonomous country: Greenland
- Municipality: Avannaata

Population (2012)
  - Total: 0
- Time zone: UTC-2:00 (Western Greenland Time)
  - Summer (DST): UTC-1:00 (Western Greenland Summer Time)
- Postal code: 3970 Pituffik

Moriusaq (also Moriussaq) is a closed settlement located in the Avannaata municipality in northern Greenland. It is located just east of the mouth of Granville Fjord, approximately 42 km (26.1 mi) to the northwest of the Pituffik Space Base and 83 km (51.6 mi) to the southwest of Qaanaaq. Hunting and fishing resources in the area are plentiful, particularly fish, narwhals, seal, and polar bears.

== Facilities ==
Moriusaq used to offer its inhabitants direct TV and radio broadcasting, Internet access, private telephones, and a small power station for electricity, costing tax payers 2 million DKK (US$330,000) annually. Moriusaq had a small store, and the "recreation building" housed a school, a church, and even a small library. In 2007, the school closed and the last teacher left for Qaanaaq because there were no school-aged children living in the settlement.

== Population decline ==
Moriusaq was established in 1963, and it reached a population peak in the 1970s when the census reported over 100 inhabitants, but it quickly dropped to 39 in 1998. In the subsequent years nearly all families moved away, particularly to Qaanaaq where the infrastructure is better and services are thus more readily available, making it the destination of choice despite the social problems prevalent in the town.

In the 2009 census, the population of Moriusaq was 5, which dropped from 21 according to the 2005 census. Two of the remaining villagers were already permanently living in Qaanaaq although they are listed as inhabitants of Moriusaq. Further, a fatal shooting of a man in a case of self-defense in 2009 decreased the remaining population, effectively leaving the settlement with only 2 inhabitants in 2010, which were a father and a son. The son fit the local power plant, supplying power to their homes.

In September 2010, the last occupants of Moriusaq moved to Qaanaaq and the settlement was closed down. On December 31, 2010, its post office officially closed. Statistics Greenland recorded the population in 2012 as 0 and they now list Moriusaq as a closed settlement.

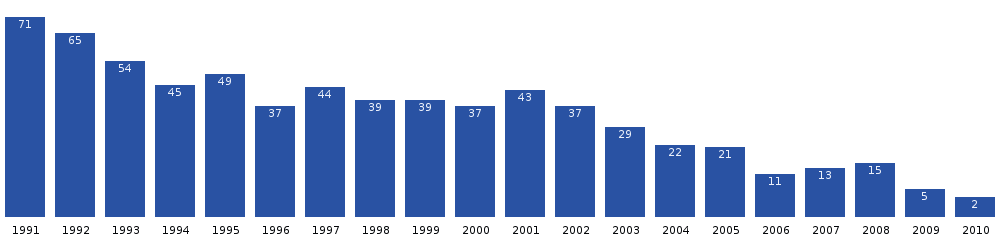
Moriusaq population growth dynamics, 1991-2010. Source: Statistics Greenland
