= Perrey =

Perrey is a surname and unisex given name. Notable people with the surname include:

- Alexis Perrey (1807–1882), French seismologist
- Mireille Perrey (1904–1991), French actress
- Nathalie Perrey (1929–2012), French actress
- Jean-Jacques Perrey (1929–2016), French electronic music producer
- Perrey and Kingsley, electronic duo
- Perrey Reeves (born 1970), American film actress

== Other uses ==
- Le Perrey, commune in France
