= Perry (disambiguation) =

Perry is an alcoholic beverage made of fermented pear juice.

Perry may also refer to:

== People ==
- Perry (given name)
- Perry (surname)

== Places ==
=== United States ===
- Perry, Arkansas
- Perry, Florida
- Perry, Georgia
- Perry, Illinois
- Perry, Iowa
- Perry, Kansas
- Perry, Louisiana
- Perry, Maine
- Perry, Michigan
- Perry, Missouri
- Perry, Nebraska
- Perry (village), New York
- Perry (town), New York
- Perry, Ohio
- Perry, Oklahoma
- Perry, Oregon
- Perry, South Carolina
- Perry, Texas
- Perry, Utah
- Perry, West Virginia
- Perry, Wisconsin
- Perry County (disambiguation)
- Perry Township (disambiguation)

=== Other ===
- Perry, Cambridgeshire, England
- River Perry, Shropshire, England
- Perry, Ontario, Canada
- Shire of Perry, a former local government area in Queensland, Australia

== Ships ==
- USS Perry, various ships

== Organisations ==
- Perry (car), by the defunct British car maker Perry Motor Company
- Perry Drug Stores, a defunct chain in the United States
- Perry & Co., an English pen-maker company

== Other uses ==
- Perry (album), by the American singer Perry Como
- Perry Nuclear Generating Station, in Lake County, Ohio
- Perry the Platypus, a fictional character from the animated television series Phineas and Ferb
- Perry (mascot), the official mascot of the 2022 Commonwealth Games
- The Band Perry, an American music group

== See also ==
- Perry River (disambiguation)
- Parry (disambiguation)
- Peary (disambiguation)
- Peri (disambiguation)
- Pery (disambiguation)
- Perri (disambiguation)
- Perrie (disambiguation)
- Perry's (disambiguation) (also includes Perrys)
- Justice Perry (disambiguation)
