= Pari, Estonia =

Village in Estonia

Pari
- Location within Estonia
- Coordinates: 57°40′21″N 27°09′04″E
- Country: Estonia
- County: Võru County
- Municipality: Võru Parish

Population
  - Total: 8

Pari is a village in Estonia, in Võru Parish, which belongs to Võru County.
