= Parri =

Parri is both a surname and a given name. Notable people with the name include:

== Surname ==
- Annette Bryn Parri, Welsh classical pianist
- Eirlys Parri (1950–2024), Welsh singer
- Ferruccio Parri (1890–1981), Italian partisan and politician
- Líbero Parri (born 1982), Spanish footballer

== Given name ==
- Parri Spinelli (c. 1387 – 1453), Italian painter
