= Maersk Peary =

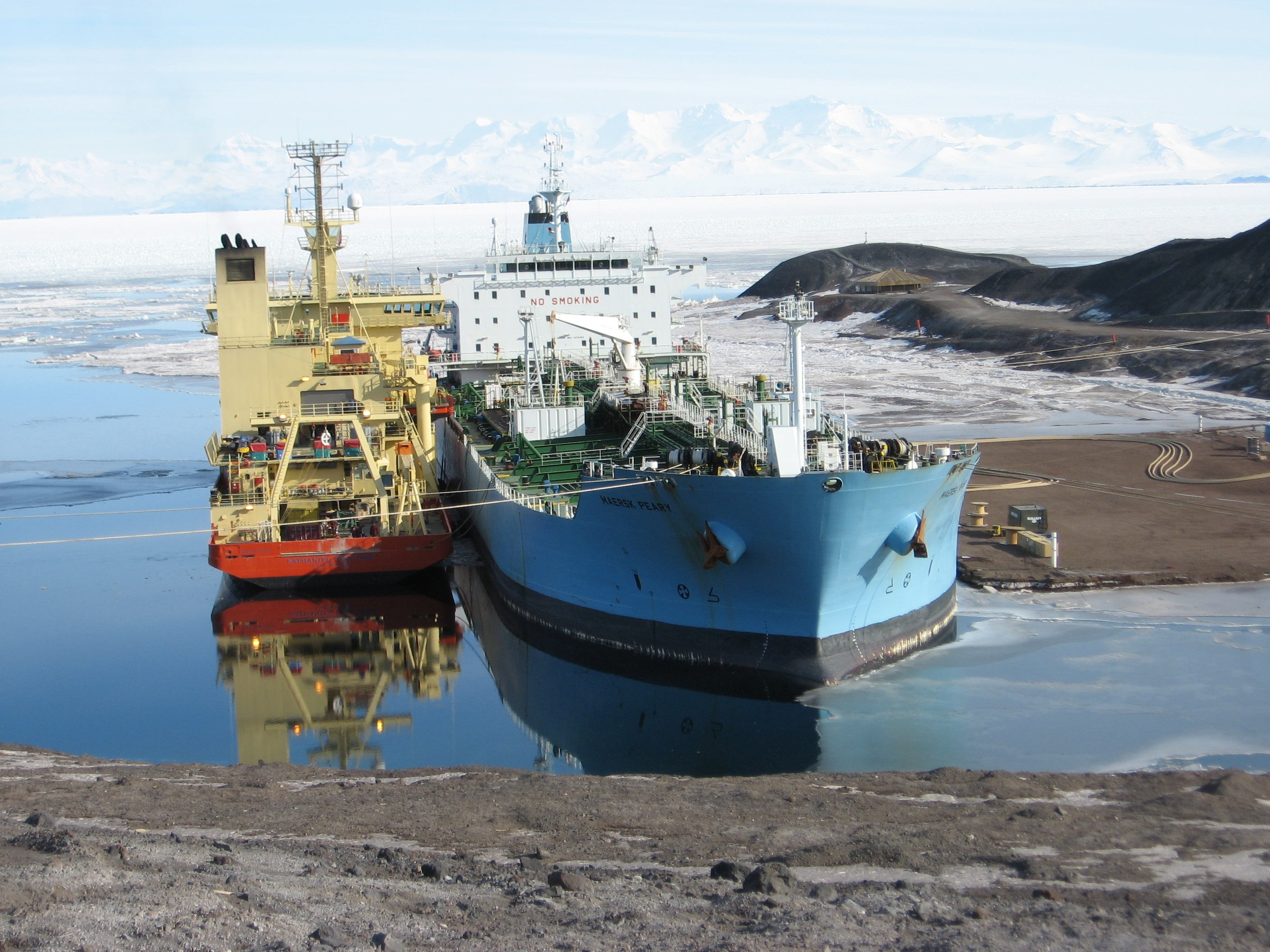
- The Maersk Peary provides fuel to McMurdo Station in Antarctica.

History
- Name: MT Jutul
- Port of registry: (Norway)
- Builder: STX Offshore & Shipbuilding Jinhae-gu, South Korea
- Laid down: 2004
- Launched: 25 September 2004
- Identification: IMO number: 9278492; MMSI number: 368236000; Callsign: WHKM
- Name: Maersk Peary
- Namesake: Robert E. Peary
- Operator: Maersk Line
- Port of registry: (United States) Norfolk, Virginia
- Acquired: 2011
- Identification: IMO number: 9278492; MMSI number: 368236000; Call Sign: WHKM; Hull number: T-AOT 5246
- Status: in active service

General characteristics
- Type: Tanker
- Tonnage: 25,487 GT; 38,177 DWT; 9,528 NT
- Length: 180 m (590 ft)
- Beam: 32 m (105 ft)
- Draft: 10.275 m (33.71 ft)
- Ice class: 1B
- Installed power: 15,000 hp diesel Hyundai MAN B&W 7S50MC-C engine
- Speed: 14.8 kn (27.4 km/h)
- Capacity: 45,186.7 cbm
- Crew: 21

Maersk Peary is a tanker, operated by the shipping firm Maersk Line, that was designed for working in the polar regions.

== History ==
She was built in 2004 by STX Offshore & Shipbuilding Jinhae-gu, South Korea, originally with a red hull and registered in Norway as the MT Jutul. In 2011, Maersk won a long-term contract to supply Thule AFB, in Greenland and McMurdo Station, in Antarctica, and the Maersk Peary was reflagged as an American vessel and painted blue, sailing with an American crew. The vessel was then leased to the Military Sealift Command.

As of August 11, 2023, Maersk Peary sails under the name Acadia Trader.

== Images ==
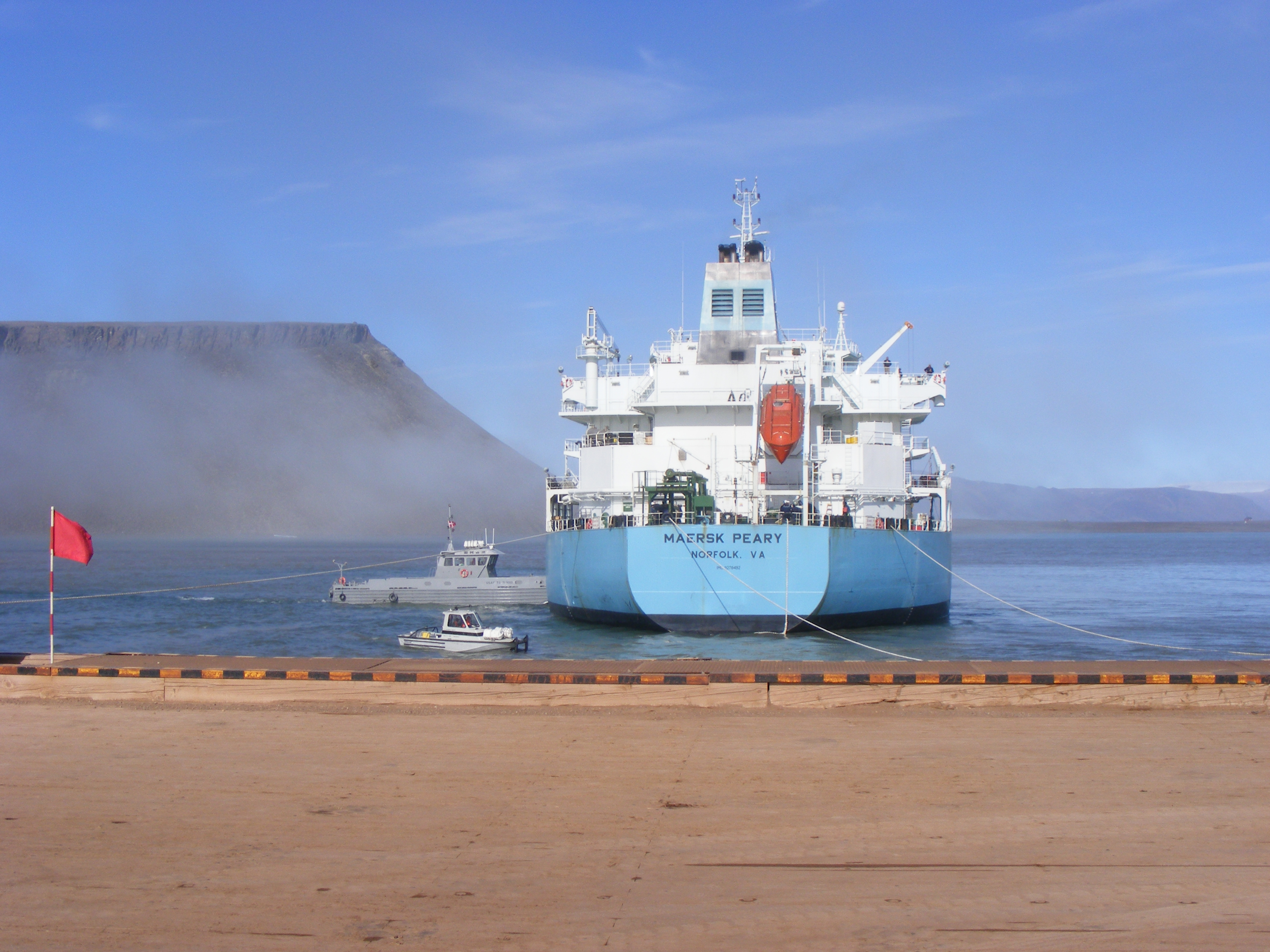
USAF Rising Star pushing the Maersk Peary at Thule AFB

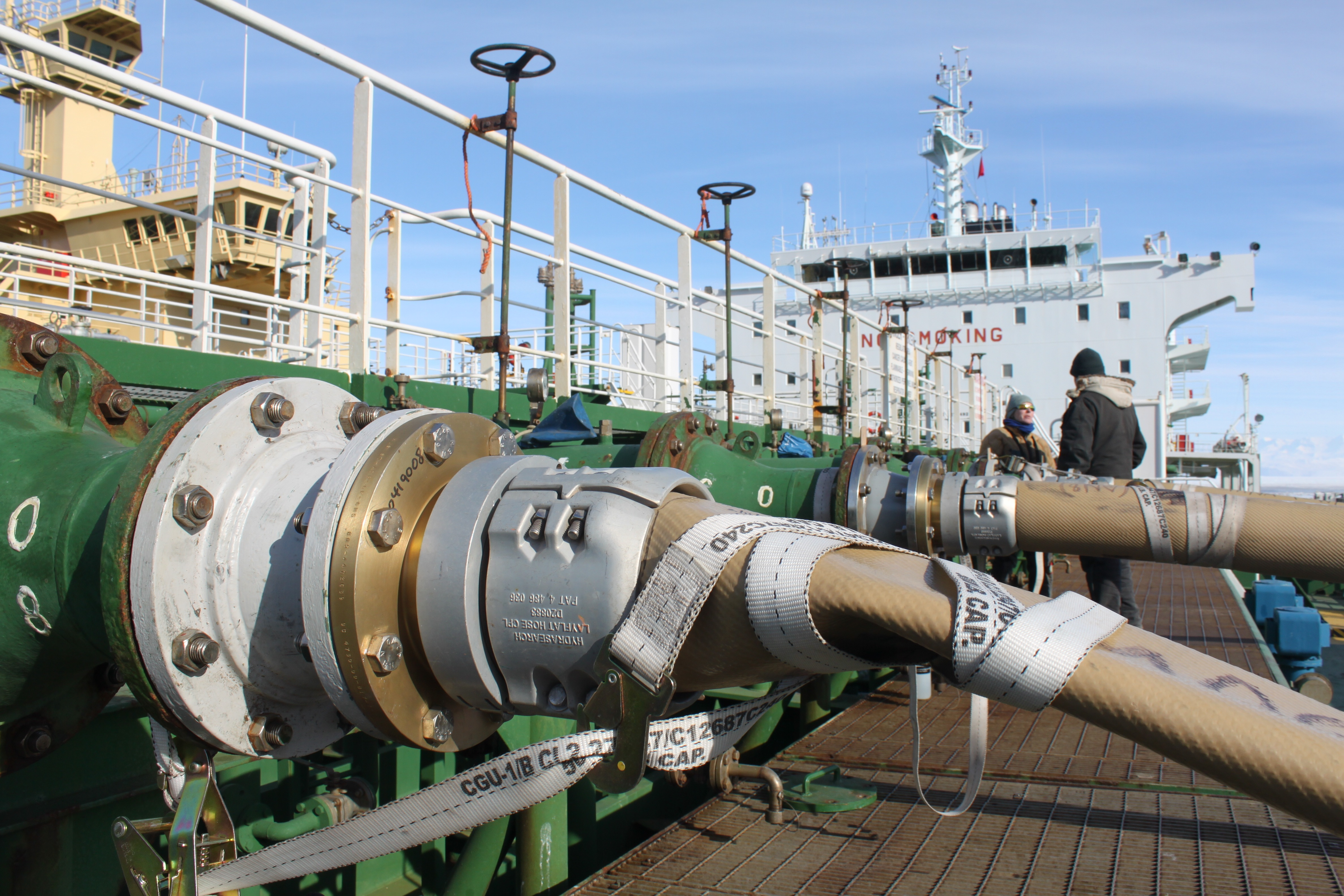
Maersk Peary off-loading fuel at the McMurdo Station, Antarctica

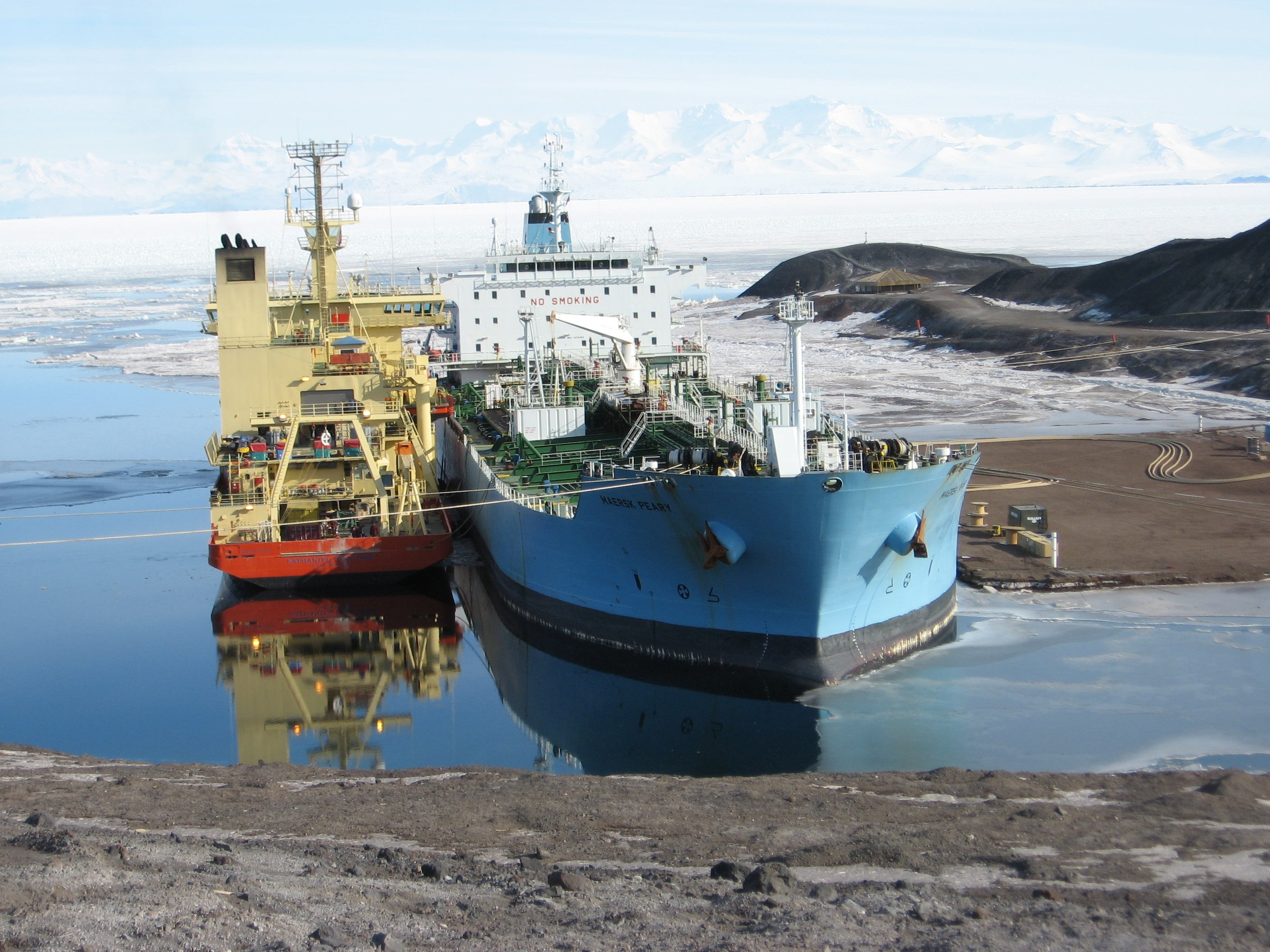
Maersk Peary at the McMurdo Station, Antarctica
