= Porri (surname) =

Porri is an Italian surname. Notable people with the surname include:

- Daniello Porri (died 1566), Italian painter
- Michel Ferracci-Porri (born 1949), French author

== See also ==
- Porri
- Porro (surname)
