= John Perie =

Recipient of the Victoria Cross

- John Perie VC
- Born: 1831; Huntly, Aberdeenshire
- Died: 17 September 1874 (aged 53); Aberdeen
- Burial place: St Peter's Cemetery, Aberdeen
- Military career
- Allegiance: United Kingdom
- Branch: British Army
- Service years: 1848–1860
- Rank: Sapper
- Units: Corps of Royal Sappers and Miners
- Conflicts: Crimean War; Second Anglo-Chinese War
- Awards: Victoria Cross; Médaille Militaire (France)

John Perie VC (1831 – 17 September 1874) was a Scottish recipient of the Victoria Cross, the highest and most prestigious award for gallantry in the face of the enemy that can be awarded to British and Commonwealth forces.

== Details ==
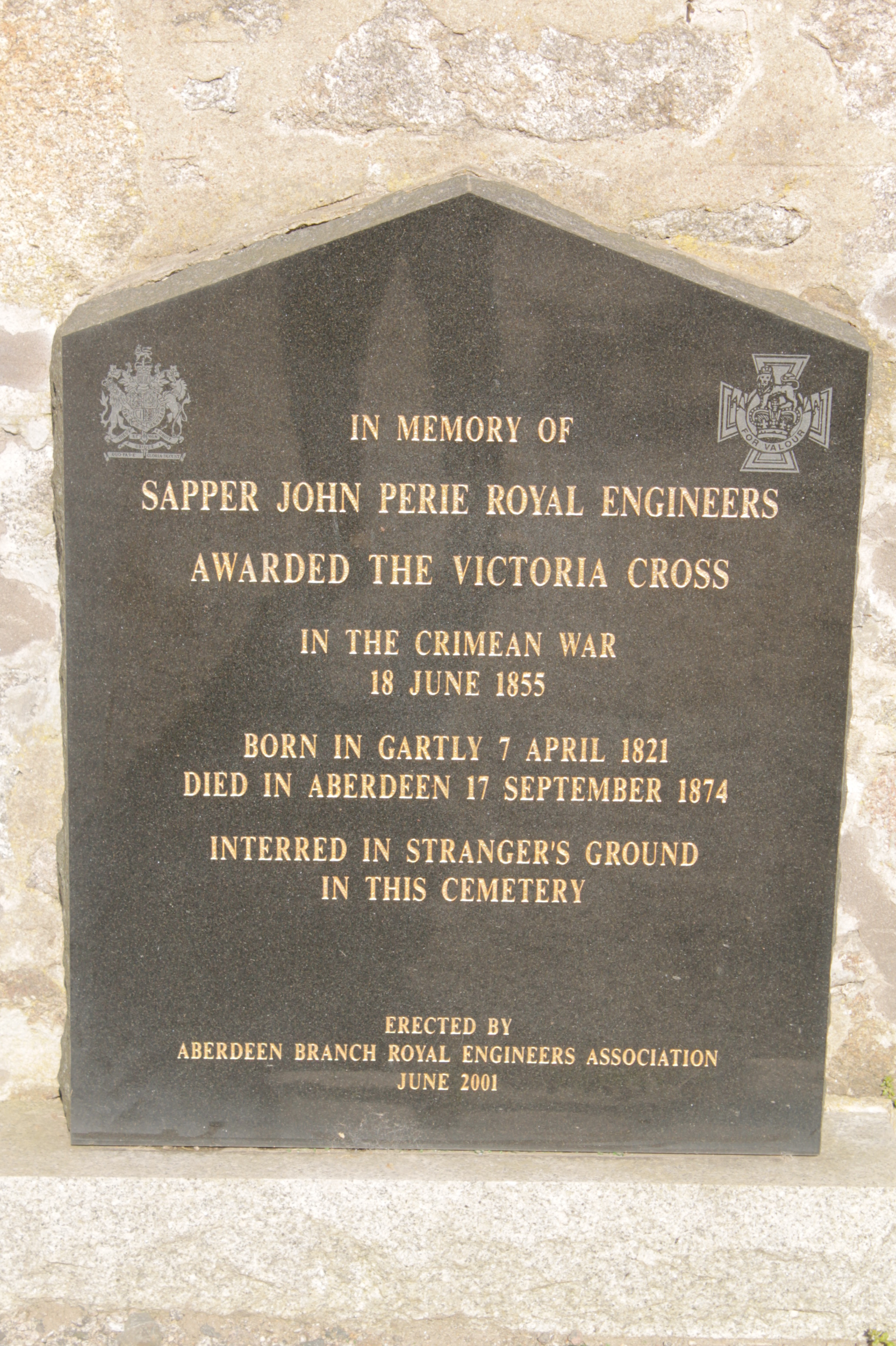
Memorial to Sapper John Perie VC, Aberdeen

Perie was born in Gartly, north-west of Aberdeen on 7 April 1821.

Perie was approximately 25 years old, and a sapper in the Royal Sappers and Miners, British Army during the Crimean War when the following deed took place for which he was awarded the VC.

On 18 June 1855 during the Siege of Sevastopol, Sapper Perie showed conspicuous gallantry, with a lieutenant (Gerald Graham) in leading a ladder party at the assault on the Redan. He also volunteered to go with the lieutenant to help bring in a wounded sailor lying in the open, even though he was himself suffering from a musket wound in the side.

He died at 69 East North Street in Aberdeen on 17 September 1874 and was buried in the "Strangers Land" (communal paupers grave) of St Peter's Cemetery in north Aberdeen.

== The medal ==
His Victoria Cross is displayed at the Royal Engineers Museum in Chatham, Kent.

== Family ==
He was married to Jessie Hay (1824 –1894 ) and had at least 2 daughters, most of whom began spelling their name as "Pirie".
