= Peary's Expedition (1908–1909) =

Robert Peary's final expedition to the North Pole

The Peary Expedition of 1908–1909
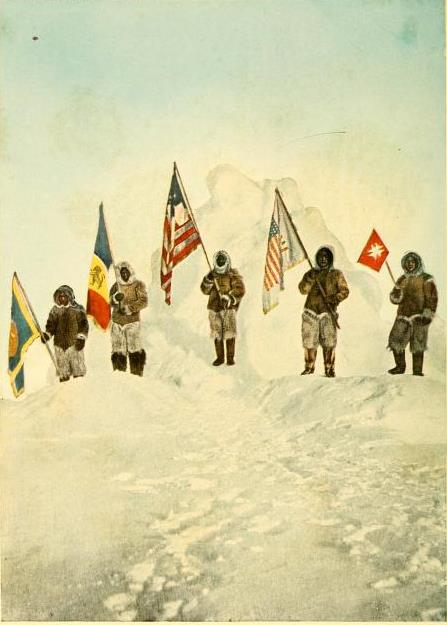
- Peary's Expedition at the North Pole, April 6, 1909 From left to right: Ukea, Uta, M. Henson, Egingwa, Siglu Photo by R. Peary
- Leader: Robert Peary
- Start: US; 6 July 1908
- End: Arctic Archipelago; 21 September 1909

The Peary Expedition of 1908–1909 was Robert Peary's sixth Arctic expedition and his third attempt to reach the North Pole, completed on April 6, 1909. According to Peary, it concluded his 23-year struggle to conquer the North Pole. The expedition set exclusively sporting objectives, and its contribution to science was therefore modest. After the return, Peary's achievement was questioned by Frederick Cook, who claimed to have reached the North Pole earlier: on April 21, 1908. The dispute has not been settled to this day, and in the second half of the twentieth century theories spread that Peary had not reached the North Pole at all.

== Background ==
=== Attempts to reach the North Pole before Peary ===
The first attempts to reach the North Pole across the drift ice date to the early nineteenth century. An attempt using man-hauled sledges was made by the English officer William Edward Parry, who departed from Svalbard and reached 82° 45′ N in July 1827. From the mid-century, the American expeditions of Kane and Hayes were the first to attempt to push into the high latitudes of the Arctic from the direction of Greenland and the Canadian Arctic archipelago. The Americans sought to reach the Pole via Nares Strait – a route known in the historical literature as the "American route" (though first described by the Russian officer F. P. Wrangel). In 1871, the American Charles Francis Hall reached 82° 11′ N aboard the Polaris, but Parry's record was not broken. The British Arctic Expedition followed the same route aboard the ships Alert and Discovery, but in the 1875 navigation season managed to reach only 82° 24′ N. In May 1876, the polar party of Albert Markham surpassed Parry's record by 35′, or 65 km. The expedition concluded with its commander firmly convinced that the North Pole was unattainable. On that way, Markham employed for the first time the system of auxiliary support groups.

The British scepticism did not trouble the publisher of the New York Herald, J. Bennett, who in 1879 became the principal sponsor of an expedition led by naval officer George W. De Long aboard the yacht Jeannette. Its aim was to reach the Pole from the Bering Strait, but in September 1879 Jeannette became trapped in the ice of the Chukchi Sea. The drift ran in a north-westerly direction, and in June 1881 Jeannette was crushed by ice pressure at 77° 15′ N – north of the New Siberian Islands and 800 km from inhabited land. The expedition members set out for the mainland in three whaleboats; one of them vanished with all hands, while De Long's group, led by the commander (11 men), perished to a man in the delta of the Lena from starvation. Of the 33 expedition members, only 13 survived. These losses were the greatest in the history of polar expeditions.

In 1884, objects from the Jeannette expedition were discovered on the south-eastern coast of Greenland. Norwegian meteorologist Henrik Mohn proposed the existence of a transpolar current and drift of ice from the Bering Strait across the North Pole to Greenland. This meant that had De Long possessed a more robust vessel, his enterprise might have succeeded. A major new breakthrough was Nansen's Fram expedition, organised on an entirely different principle: the specially built ice ship Fram was frozen into the drift ice west of the New Siberian Islands, which carried the expedition north-westward, though the current did not pass through the circumpolar region. During the expedition, its leader Fridtjof Nansen reached 86° 13′ 36″ N by sled drawn by 28 sled dogs on April 8, 1895. Headwinds and currents prevented the Norwegians from covering the 400 km separating them from the Pole.

Nansen's results were surpassed on April 25, 1900 by Captain Umberto Cagni of the expedition of the Duke of the Abruzzi. Operating from Franz Josef Land, the Italians reached 86° 34′ N, exceeding Nansen's mark by approximately 21′ (about 22 nautical miles or 41 km). This was achieved at great cost: three expedition members died. The record was set by inexperienced polar explorers using an excessive number of sled dogs – more than 100 – and the system of auxiliary support groups.

The next attempts to reach the North Pole in the early 20th century (for example, the Ziegler Expedition) were mainly conducted from Svalbard or Franz Josef Land, since the "American route" had been monopolised by Robert Peary, who tolerated no rivals.

In the view of glaciologist and historian of polar exploration V. S. Koryakin, the results of attempts to reach the North Pole before the 20th century were as follows:

1. The polar problem arose in connection with attempts to find a direct route from Europe to the Pacific basin.
2. Historically, the first base for reaching the Pole was the Svalbard archipelago, explored by European sailors since the 17th century; other routes to the Pole were reconnoitred later.
3. In the mid-19th century, the "American route" was established through the system of straits separating Ellesmere Island from Greenland; the use of other routes – from the Bering Strait, Franz Josef Land, or Greenland – appears by comparison rather coincidental.
4. The "American route" held a decisive advantage – the possibility of drawing on the labour and polar experience of the Eskimos of northern Greenland, who above all supplied sled dogs, built trail shelters (igloos), and so on.
5. From the mid-19th century, researchers from the United States led in the exploration of the high Arctic latitudes; the role of other nations, including the British and Norwegians, does not appear numerically significant.
6. The attainment of the North Pole fell in a historical period when the discovery of new lands and archipelagos – the elimination of "blank spots" on the world map – had virtually been completed, but when the study of natural, global processes was only just beginning.
7. Polar expeditions revealed the limits of human physical capacity, demonstrated the exhaustion of traditional research methods, and introduced new technical means, primarily of transport.

=== Peary's 1886–1906 expeditions ===
Although Robert Peary came to the Arctic almost by chance, he regarded reaching the North Pole as the great work of his life. Of his 63 years, 23 were devoted to expeditions, spending a total of 18 years in the Far North (with five spent on preparation for the journeys). Like Nansen, Peary had been drawn in by the report of Nordenskiöld, who in 1883 had penetrated quite deep into the Greenland ice sheet. However, the Navy declined to fund the venture, for which Peary's mother lent him $500.

Peary conducted the following expeditions:

1. Greenland, 1886. Peary arrived at Qeqertarsuaq on a small yacht, Eagle. There he purchased two sleds, hired eight Eskimos, and on June 23 set out into the interior of the glacier. He was also accompanied by the assistant to the Danish governor, Christian Maigaard. Having covered 100 miles (160 km) over 26 travel days and reaching an altitude of 2,294 m, Peary was forced to turn back: provisions remained for only six days. After the expedition, Peary was obliged to spend five years seeking funds for the next journey, during which time Greenland was crossed in 1888 by Nansen and Sverdrup without dogs and by a completely different route. Peary was greatly aggrieved at Nansen, believing that he had appropriated his idea.
2. Greenland, 1891–1892. The expedition included the Norwegian Eivind Astrup, the physician Frederick Cook, Matthew Henson – Peary's constant servant and assistant since 1887 – and Peary's wife, Josephine Diebitsch. Departing on May 3, 1892 from Whale Sound with 20 dogs, Peary and Astrup covered 1,250 miles (2.010 km) before arriving back at their winter quarters on 6 August, becoming the first to reach the northern coast of Greenland. This expedition established Peary's reputation as a major polar explorer and greatly eased the raising of funds for subsequent journeys.
3. Greenland, 1893–1895. This explored the north-western coast of Greenland and again included Eivind Astrup and Josephine Peary. With Eskimo guides, Peary discovered about 40 miles (65 km) east of Cape York the site of three giant iron meteorite fragments, uncovering one of them. (Eventually he managed to transport all three and sell them to the American Museum of Natural History in New York.) In spring 1895, he again reached the northern coast of Greenland, discovering Peary Land. He concluded that this area was the only possible base for reaching the North Pole. During the winter quarters, Robert and Josephine Peary's daughter, Marie Ahnighito, was born.
4. Greenland and Ellesmere Island, 1898–1902. This was Peary's first expedition to have the explicit goal of reaching the North Pole. It was financed by the Peary Arctic Club, founded by a number of members of the American elite. The expedition vessel was the yacht Windward, which had previously served Jackson. The intended base was Fort Conger on the coast of Ellesmere Island, but severe ice conditions stopped the ship 150 miles short of its goal. The base had to be supplied during the polar night, with temperatures dropping to −67 °C, as a result of which Peary suffered frostbite to eight toes, which had to be amputated. Nevertheless, by spring 1899 Peary again set out for the northern coast of Greenland. Simultaneously, Sverdrup's Fram expedition was operating on Ellesmere Island – a rival Peary regarded as a competitor in the race for the Pole. Because of this, no meeting between the two famous polar explorers ever took place. (Note: However, according to another account: "Peary's spirit was not improved on 6 October by a meeting with Otto Sverdrup, whose well-equipped expedition was wintering close by.") Peary reached Cape Washington (82° 23′ N), which he considered the northernmost point of land and the best departure base for the polar march. In 1899, the Arctic Club sent a supply ship, allowing the expedition to extend its stay in the Arctic. In 1900, Peary reached what he thereupon named Cape Morris Jesup, the actual northernmost point of Greenland. The expedition's greatest achievement was charting the northern coastline of Greenland and Grant Land (the northern part of Ellesmere Island). In spring 1902, Peary set out from Cape Hecla accompanied by Henson and four Eskimos toward the North Pole, reaching 84° 17′ N.
5. Central Arctic, 1905–1906. A specially designed vessel, the Roosevelt, was constructed for the expedition, named after the President of the United States. Favourable weather allowed passage as far as Cape Sheridan, to which 67 Eskimos and about two hundred dogs were also transported. For the first time, Peary employed the system of intermediate depots and support groups. The march toward the North Pole began on March 6, 1906; Peary was accompanied by Henson and six Eskimos. Extensive leads, young ice, and severe blizzards prevented progress to the Pole, not least because the ice fields were drifting eastward. Peary resolved at least to break the record set by Umberto Cagni, and on April 21 reached, by Peary's account (which has been questioned), 87° 6′ N – 320 km short of the Pole. Owing to the ice drift, the party emerged onto the northern coast of Greenland with provisions almost exhausted. The return was possible only after the chance discovery of muskoxen. On his return, Peary received awards from the US government and resolved to make one final attempt to reach the North Pole.

== Preparations ==
=== Plan ===
Peary published his plans for the polar march in several periodicals in early May 1908. The Roosevelt was to proceed through Belle Isle Strait, Davis Strait, and Baffin Bay to Whale Sound, where, after taking on dogs and Eskimos, it would continue to Cape Sheridan to winter. The sledge journey would begin from Cape Columbia in February. The course would have a north-westerly offset to compensate for the eastward drift of the ice. According to Peary, the plan was borne out in every detail.

=== Equipment and finances ===
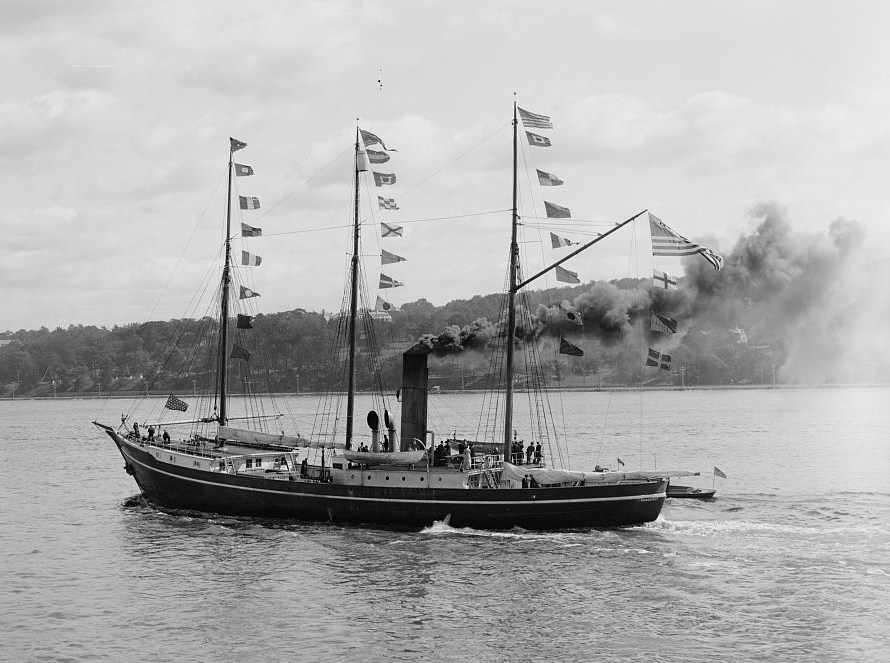
Roosevelt on the Hudson River in 1909

The outfitting of the polar march was complicated by the aftermath of the 1907 financial crisis. Peary wrote:

The repairs and alterations to the Roosevelt had drained the Club's treasury. And we still needed money to purchase provisions and equipment, to pay the crew's wages and meet current expenses. Jesup was no longer with us; the country had not yet recovered from the financial crash that had struck last autumn; everyone had been impoverished. [...] Money trickled in slowly. It was all I thought of waking, and even in my sleep it gave me no peace, pursuing me with tantalizing and elusive visions. It was a burdensome, cheerless, desperate time, when the hopes of my entire life ebbed and flowed from day to day.

Peary had the financial support of members of the American elite, above all the banker Morris Ketchum Jesup. He died in January 1908, but a large (undisclosed) donation was made by his widow. One of the sponsors was President Theodore Roosevelt (in a private capacity). The cost of the expedition vessel was $100,000, but the 1905–1906 journey had shown that the hull needed reinforcing and the steam boiler replacing, requiring a further 75,000. In addition to contributions from Arctic Club members, a national subscription was opened, and many donors sent small sums of between 1 and 100 dollars; at the last moment, the Massachusetts paper manufacturer Zenas Crane contributed 10,000 dollars. The National Geographic Society also provided support. Peary did not, however, disclose the total cost of the expedition.

The expedition's sail-and-steam vessel, Roosevelt, was of wooden construction, 182 feet (56 m) in length, 35 feet (10.6 m) in beam, and drew 16 feet (4.8 m) with a displacement of 1,600 tons. The hull was egg-shaped, designed to be squeezed upward by the ice; the thickness of certain parts, such as the stem, reached 30 inches (76 cm). The expedition members' living quarters were in a deck superstructure spanning the full width of the vessel from the mainmast to the mizzenmast above the engine room; their interior walls were lined with pine boards painted white, and Peary's cabin was equipped with a bath. (Peary does not mention in his report any constructional particulars or even the power of the steam engine.)

The expedition was adequately provisioned, though, in Peary's own words, "variety it did not offer". There were 16,000 lb (7,250 kg) of flour, 1,000 lb (454 kg) of coffee , 800 lb (363 kg) of tea, 10,000 lb (4,536 kg) of sugar, 7,000 lb (3,175 kg) of bacon, 10,000 lb of hardtack, 30,000 lb (13,608 kg) of pemmican, 3,000 lb (1,360 kg) of dried fish, and 1,000 lb of smoking tobacco. In addition there were 100 cases of condensed milk and 3,500 gallons (13,252 litres of kerosene). A deficiency of vitamins and other nutrients was made up through hunting seals, walruses, and muskoxen:

What characterises my expeditions is that we never carried meat with us. I have always relied on resources found along the way. The purpose of winter hunting is the meat itself, not recreation, as some suppose.

The ration on sledge marches was extremely limited: 1 lb (454 g) of pemmican, 1 lb of hardtack, 4 oz (113 g) of condensed milk, ½ oz (14 g) of tea, and 6 oz (1.77 decilitres) of liquid fuel for their preparation. Both in winter quarters and on the march, the American expedition members ate twice a day.

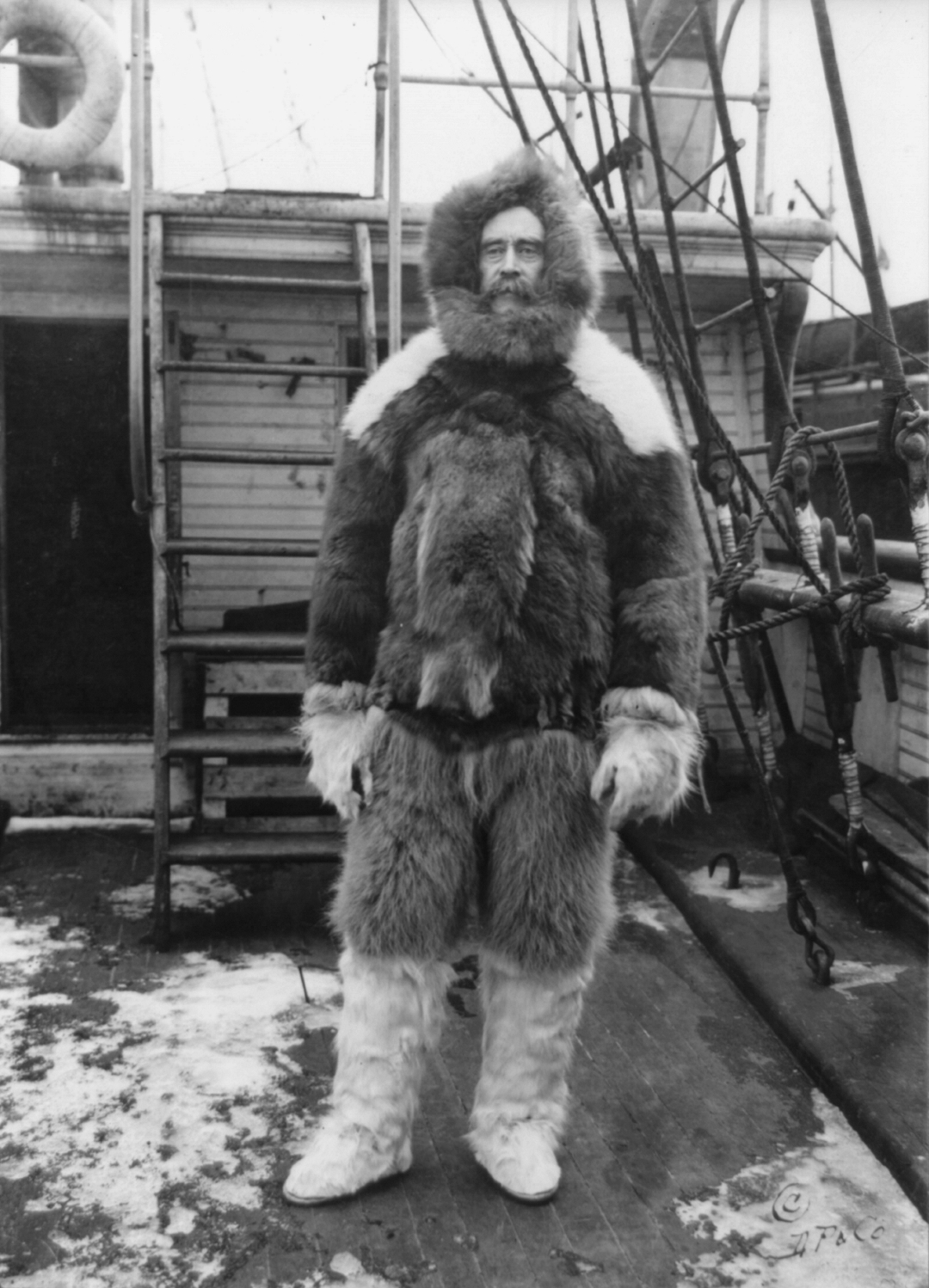
Peary in Eskimo sheepskin clothing on the deck of Roosevelt

The crew – both Americans and Eskimos – wore Eskimo fur clothing made on the spot. Peary, however, preferred sheepskins he had brought with him to reindeer and bear hides; from these the Eskimo women sewed clothing for the Americans to individual order. Footwear was Eskimo-style, made from sealskin with hare-fur stockings; mittens were double: the outer pair from bearskin, the inner from deerskin.

Peary used sleds of his own design, made of oak on the Eskimo model – with solid sides, but rounded at front and back and fitted with steel runners two inches wide. The sleds were 13 feet long, 2 feet wide, and 7 inches tall, with a load capacity of up to 1,200 lb (544 kg). A team of eight dogs was hitched in the Greenlandic fan formation. The harnesses were made from linen webbing and cord, consisting of two loops connected by ties at the withers and throat. The men either rode on the sleds or walked alongside on skis.

Peary refused to use tents or sleeping bags on the marches (tents were still used during depot-laying). At rest stops, snow igloos were built: 5×8 feet for three persons, or 8×10 feet for five. An igloo took about one hour to build; its advantage was that it served as a landmark and could be used for rest on the return journey. The men slept fully dressed, lying on muskox hides and covering themselves with reindeer skins. Footwear and mittens could be dried on alcohol stoves. For cooking, two kerosene lamps with double burners and four-inch (10 cm) wicks were used. The pots held five gallons (19 litres) and served as casing for the lamp during travel. One pot was filled with broken ice for melting; the other was used for cooking. Peary claimed that melting ice and making tea required only 10 minutes.

=== Transporting strategy ===
The strategy was based on the so-called "Peary System", whose principal elements were:

1. The expedition's ship must push through the ice to the northernmost point on the continent from which it could return the following year.
2. During the winter, carry out intensive hunting so that the expedition members always have a supply of fresh meat.
3. Take 60% more dogs than will be needed.
4. Select able-bodied, hardy, and thoroughly loyal men, among whom there must be Eskimos, as the most adapted to the harsh Arctic conditions.
5. In advance deliver to the expedition's sledge-march departure point sufficient provisions, fuel, clothing, camp stoves, and other equipment so that the main party can reach the Pole, and the support groups can reach their assigned points and return.
6. Carefully check and test every item of equipment, ensuring it is of the finest quality and minimum weight.
7. The expedition must be equipped with the best type of sleds.
8. The expedition's commander must exercise absolute authority over all members, so that his every order is carried out without question.
9. The return must be made by the same route followed northward, using the beaten trail and the igloos already built.

Peary had already employed the system of support groups on the 1905–1906 journey. Its logic was as follows: the distance from Cape Columbia to the Pole and back amounts to about 900 miles (precisely, as the crow flies, 413 miles each way), and it would therefore be impossible, in Peary's view, to carry all the necessary equipment and provisions (Peary also practised the killing of sled dogs and feeding them to their companions, as the Norwegians Nansen and Amundsen had done). The polar party itself therefore travels light, while its predecessors supply one another with food and fuel, break trail, and build camp igloos. There were three support groups: Bartlett's (the vanguard), Borup's, and Marvin's; each with three Eskimos. Bartlett's task was to press on in any weather and reconnoitre the route. Having covered two-thirds of the distance, the groups handed over their best animals and supplies to Peary and turned back. Each party carried provisions for 50 days for the driver and the dogs, with the dogs themselves serving as a reserve food source.

At Etah in Greenland in August, 246 Eskimo dogs were taken on, together with 70 tonnes of whale meat and 50 walrus carcasses for their feed. However, the whale meat proved unfit for feed, and by November 8, 1908 only 193 dogs remained; moreover by November 10, a further 12 dogs had to be shot. By November 25, 160 dogs remained, of which 10 were in poor condition. On December 21, a further 14 dogs were shot. In total, 140 dogs worked in the field, harnessed to 28 sleds. Thirty-eight dogs, harnessed to five sleds, reached the Pole.

=== Scientific equipment and navigation methods ===
Although the Peary Expedition did not pursue strictly scientific aims, it nevertheless carried out geographical measurements, meteorological observations, and similar work. The United States Coast Guard tasked Peary with investigating tidal phenomena along the southern coast of the Arctic Ocean; these measurements were conducted by Marvin and Borup in November 1908 – during the polar night – and were taken from an igloo built on the fast ice over a tidal crack, using a graduated tide gauge driven into the seabed. It was found that tides at Cape Sheridan did not exceed 1.8 feet (55 cm); and at Cape Columbia, 0.8 feet (24 cm). (In New York the average is 12 feet, 3.6 m.)

Peary intended to sound the depth of the Arctic Ocean along the entire distance from Cape Columbia to the Pole. For this purpose, a portable sounding device was constructed that fit on a single sled. It weighed only 103 pounds (47 kg) and consisted of two wooden drums, each wound with 1,000 fathoms (1,829 m) of piano wire. At the end of the line was a small bronze sediment sampler. This device was in the charge of the vanguard, and soundings were made regularly – in leads, or, when none were available, through bored holes in the ice. Two men could operate the apparatus. The bottom was never reached: Peary could not have known that the depth of the Arctic Ocean in those regions exceeds 4,000 m.

The methods used by Peary's men to determine their position are noteworthy. The distance covered each day was determined by dead reckoning and corrected by sun sights. There were three navigators in the expedition: Peary, Borup, and Marvin. Dead reckoning was based on compass course and odometer; longitude was not determined at all. Since the odometers failed on uneven ice, distance travelled was determined by feel alone. Latitude was determined on average every five marches on the way to the Pole. The glaciologist and historian of polar exploration V. S. Koryakin writes on this point:

On the way back, Peary concentrated primarily on finding the tracks of Bartlett's, Marvin's, and other advance groups – he trusted these more than his own abilities as a navigator. It is telling that on the return Peary did not take a single celestial observation, even for verification purposes.

== Crew ==
The expedition included 22 Americans and 49 Eskimos (22 men, 17 women, and 10 children).

=== American expedition members ===
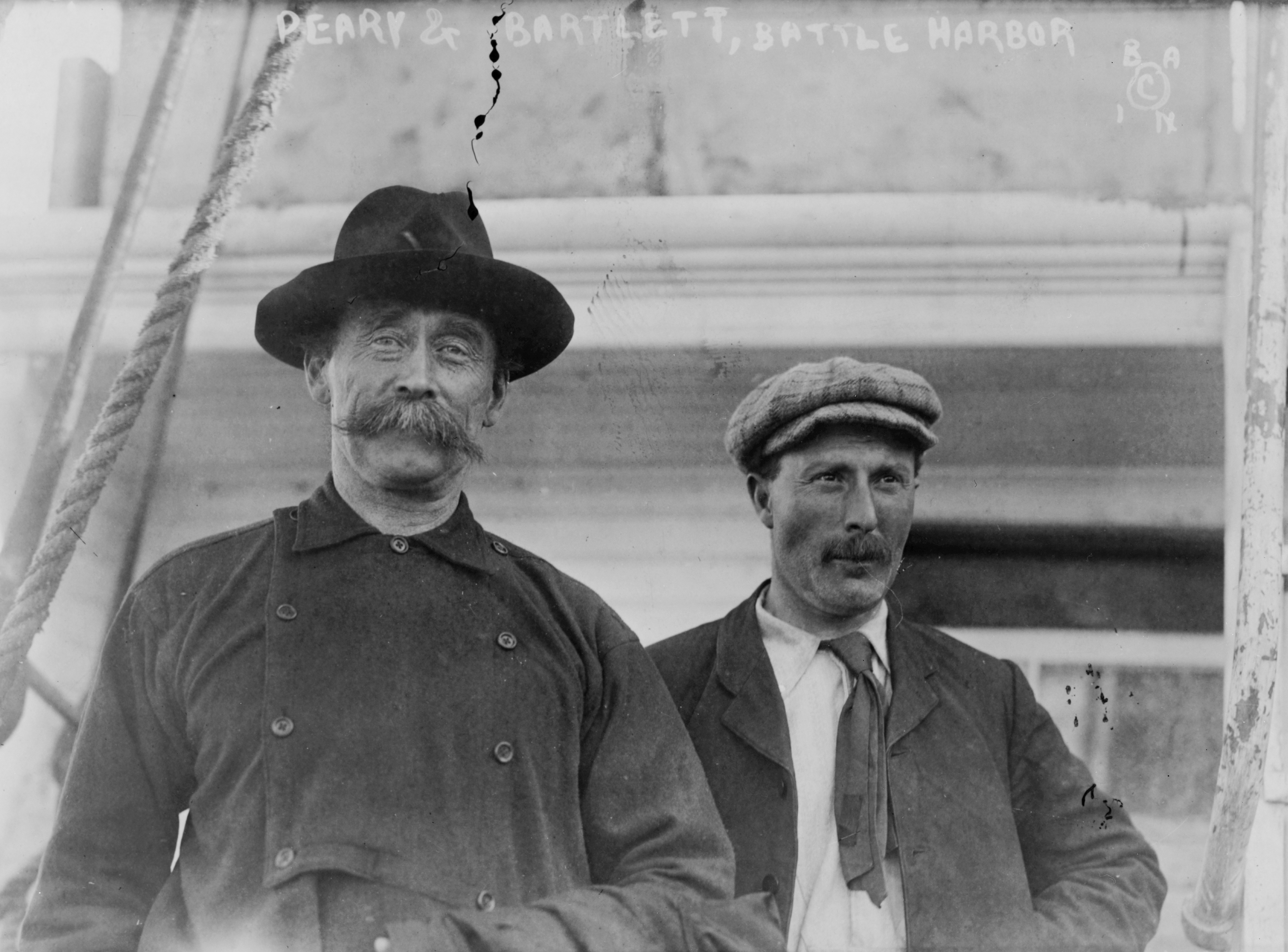
Peary and Bartlett in Labrador

==== Members of the sledge journeys ====
- Robert Peary — expedition commander, commander of the sledge party, commander of the United States Navy. At the start of the expedition he was 52 years old.
- Robert Bartlett — a native of Newfoundland, aged 33; captain of Roosevelt and commander of the auxiliary sledge groups.
- John W. Goodsell, MD — ship's surgeon, member of the American College of Physicians.
- Matthew Henson — servant and assistant to Peary.
- Ross Marvin — Peary's secretary, a Cornell University graduate, a civil engineer by profession.
- Donald MacMillan — assistant, taken on at the insistence of the US Coast Guard; mathematics teacher at Worcester Academy (Massachusetts).
- George Borup — assistant; a graduate of Yale University, formerly employed by the Pennsylvania Railroad.

==== Ship's crew ====
The other crew members were natives of Newfoundland:

- George A. Wardwell — chief engineer.
- Thomas Gushue — first mate.
- John Murphy — boatswain; left at Etah (Greenland) to guard the depot for the return journey.
- Banks Scott — second engineer.
- Charles Percy — cook.
- William Pritchard — cabin boy; left at Etah (Greenland) to guard the depot for the return journey.
- John Connors — seaman.
- John Coady — seaman.
- John Barnes — seaman.
- Dennis Murphy — seaman.
- George Percy — seaman.
- J. Bently — stoker.
- Patrick Joyce — stoker.
- Patrick Skeans — stoker.
- John Wiseman — stoker.

=== Greenlandic expedition members ===
From 1891 onward, Peary employed Eskimos on his polar journeys as guides, dog drivers, hunters, and labourers. They were members of the tribe inhabiting Cape York, numbering 220–230 people. Peary brought Eskimo women to the winter quarters – it was they who sewed the fur clothing for the sledge marches. Peary mentions the Eskimo members of his team only in passing, and the list is incomplete. Peary used his own transliteration of the Greenlandic language. In his report he gives the following names (italics denote those who reached the North Pole):

- Ootah
- Egingwah — brother of the preceding
- Seegloo
- Ooqueah — aged 20 at the start of the expedition. Peary compared him to a knight and particularly emphasised that he had gone to the North Pole so that the fee and glory of the journey might win the heart of his beloved at Cape York.
- Aletah
- Ooblooyah
- Inighito
- Cookswah Inighito
- Wesharpkoopsie
- Keshungwah
- Koolatoonah
- Onwagipsoo
- Karko
- Kyutah
- Tawchingwah
- Arko
- Pingahshoo — a boy of 12
- Kudlooktoo — In 1926 it would become known that he was implicated in the murder of Marvin.
- Pooadloonah — brother of Egingwah and Ootah; deserted after Peary refused to take him to the Pole
- Panikpah — deserted after the sledge groups began their work
- Kudlah, nicknamed "Harrigan" — a relative of Kudlooktoo; reported that Marvin had drowned

The expedition report mentions the following Eskimo women:

- Ahtetah
- Tookoomah — wife of Egingwah
- Akatingwah — gave birth to a boy aboard Roosevelt on March 8, 1909
- "Miss Bill" (native name not given)
- Inahloo
- Alnayah, nicknamed "Buster"

== Expedition course ==
=== The journey to the Arctic ===
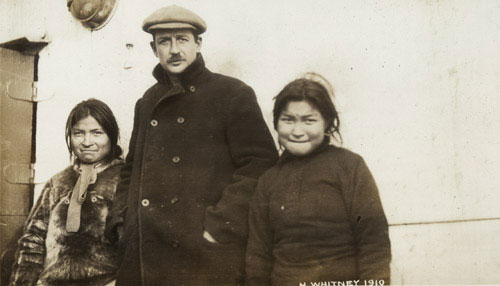
Harry Whitney with two Eskimo women. Photograph of 1910

The factual account of the expedition is based on Peary's report, which is the sole source of information.

On July 6, 1908 at 13:00 Eastern Time, Roosevelt left New York, casting off from the pier at East 24th Street. Peary himself was not on board: he had been invited to a reception at the President's on July 7, while the vessel was to proceed to New Bedford for boats and spare parts. Peary boarded his ship only at Sydney, which the expedition left on July 17. According to Peary, this was the closest point to the Arctic where coal could be taken on. The Arctic Circle was crossed on July 26, and on August 1 the expedition arrived in Greenland at Cape York. About 100 dogs were purchased there, and several Eskimo families were taken on board. Roosevelt and the supply vessel Erik (commanded by Sam Bartlett, uncle of the captain of Roosevelt) then proceeded along the Greenland coast, recruiting Eskimos and purchasing dogs. On August 11, the ships arrived at Etah, where an additional 300 tonnes of coal and 50 tonnes of walrus meat were loaded aboard Roosevelt. A depot was also established there for the return journey, including 50 tonnes of coal; the boatswain Murphy and the cabin boy Pritchard were left to guard it, along with hunter Harry Whitney, who had arrived on Erik.

At Etah, Peary received news of Frederick Cook, meeting a member of his expedition, the steward Rudolf Franke. Peary sent him back to the United States: the doctor had found that he was suffering from scurvy. On August 18, Roosevelt headed north: 350 more miles of ice fields remained before Cape Sheridan. There were 69 people and 246 dogs on board, with the dogs and Eskimos accommodated on the upper deck. The weather was initially favourable: on August 22, 100 miles were covered in open water. Roosevelt then encountered icebergs and constant storms; several times the vessel became stuck in the ice; on August 29 she ran aground, but Cape Sheridan was reached on September 4, 1908. Peary wrote that he and Bartlett had not undressed for sleep during the last 13 days of the voyage, ready for any eventuality.

On the shore of Ellesmere Island, a winter depot was established, named Hubbardville in honour of the president of the Arctic Club and the Geographical Society. The boats were brought ashore, and three buildings were constructed from packing cases, to be used as workshops. The crew continued to occupy their berths and cabins. On the upper deck of Roosevelt, wooden partitions were erected for the Eskimos, divided into family compartments.

=== Wintering ===
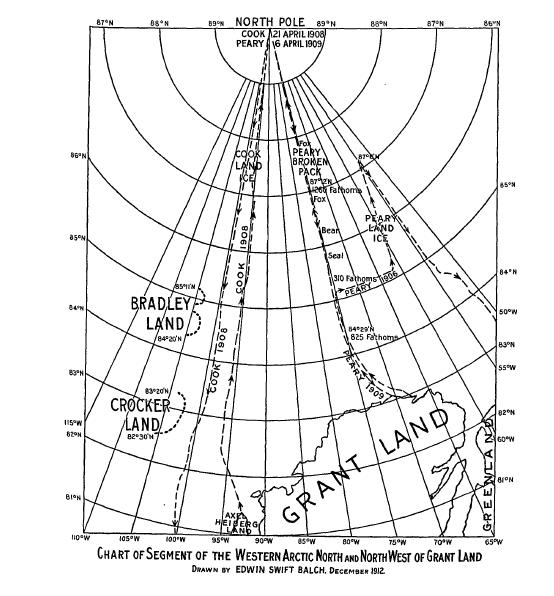
Map of the routes of Peary and Cook. From Edwin Swift Balch's book The North Pole and Bradley Land. New York, 1913. P. 83. The northern part of Ellesmere Island was called "Grant Land" at the time.

As early as September 16, Borup, Marvin, and Goodsell set out with 200 dogs and 13 Eskimos on 16 sleds to establish supply caches at Cape Belnap. On September 18, a second party departed, tasked with delivering 56 boxes of pemmican to Cape Richardson and from there transporting hardtack to Cape Belnap. The troops returned on September 19, and already on September 21 set out to lay down caches of dog food – 6,600 pounds (3 t) of meat – with 22 sledges and 19 Eskimos. On September 28, Borup headed directly for Cape Columbia. Peary wrote:

I didn't systematically work out, because I did'n see particular benefit in it. Until now my body had always obeyed my will, whatever demands I made upon it. During the winter I was chiefly occupied with perfecting the equipment and with the mathematical calculation of pounds of food and miles of distance to be covered. It was the lack of food that had forced us to turn back from 87° 06′ north latitude. Hunger, not cold, is the dragon guarding the Arctic Rhine gold.

The autumn was marked by an influenza epidemic, from which MacMillan and Goodsell suffered particularly. Peary noted that influenza outbreaks in the Arctic corresponded in timing to epidemics in Europe and the United States, and suggested that the pathogen was carried by atmospheric currents. Although the fires in the galley and the sailors' quarters were kept burning around the clock, in Peary's words:

In winter, once a week or every ten days we used to remove the ice that had formed through condensation of water vapor on the cold outer walls from the cabins. Ice built up behind every piece of furniture standing against an outer wall, and from under the bunks we chipped it out and carried it away in buckets. Books were always placed at the very edge of the shelf, because a book pushed too far back would freeze solid to the wall, and in a thaw, or if a stove were lit in the cabin, the ice would melt and the book would become soaked and moldy.

The polar night began on November 1; on that day a winter routine was introduced aboard the ship: reveille at 8 a.m., breakfast at 9, dinner at 2:00 p.m. (the expedition members ate twice a day). The ship's bell was struck only twice: from 10:00 p.m. the Eskimos were forbidden to make noise, and the signal for lights out was given at midnight. The rations of the ship's crew and Peary's immediate party differed, and the Eskimos cooked for themselves. The laying of supply caches continued, and it became clear that alcohol lamps and stoves could not be used inside igloos, as the Eskimos regularly suffered alcohol intoxication from combustion products. On November 7, at the first winter full moon, MacMillan departed for Cape Columbia for a month to carry out tidal observations. With him were Barnes (a seaman) and the Eskimos Egingwa and Inigito with their wives.

On November 11, a double halo and eight mock moons on the southern side of the sky. During the night of November 12, an extremely powerful ice pressure event began, and ice ridges up to 30 feet high formed just 20 feet (6 m) from the ship. The crew had to be urgently evacuated onto the ice; the temperature that night reached −20 °F (approximately −30 °C). Marvin also suffered that day: his igloo, built over a tidal crack, split in two.

After celebrating Christmas, on December 29 Marvin and Bartlett were sent to the Greenland coast with nine Eskimos and 54 dogs, their objective being hunting. The groups of Goodsell and Borup, dispatched on December 30 for the same purpose, headed to Ellesmere Island toward Cape Markham and Lake Hazen, thus achieving coverage of territory within 90 miles in all directions from the wintering site. The hunters met with little success overall; only Goodsell took 83 Arctic hares, the hunters killing them with blows of a rifle butt to the head – the animals showed no fear of humans.

=== March to the Pole ===
Bartlett's party was the first to depart – on February 15, still in the polar night, lighting their way with kerosene lanterns. Peary set out light on February 22 (George Washington's birthday) with two Eskimos, on two sledges drawn by 16 dogs. That day the sun rose at 10:00 a.m. At that point seven white expedition members, 19 Eskimos, and 140 dogs harnessed to 28 sledges were already on the march. By Cape Columbia only 133 dogs remained. On March 5, having traveled only 45 miles from Cape Columbia, Peary was stopped by open leads that prevented any forward progress for five days. On March 11 the lead closed at −45 °F (−43 °C), and the men were able to cover 12 miles. On the night of March 13 the temperature dropped to −55 °F (−48 °C); that same day Peary met Goodsell's party and sent it back. MacMillan's party was sent back on March 15; Peary now had 16 men, 12 sledges, and 100 dogs. During those days the expedition crossed a broad belt of pressure ridges; by March 19 the temperature held at −50 °F (−45 °C), and the brandy they had brought along had frozen solid.

During our final march it was often so cold that the brandy froze, the kerosene turned white and viscous, and the dogs were barely visible through the steam of their breath. The necessity of building each night cramped and uncomfortable snow houses, and the cold bed on which we had to snatch sleep in just such snatches as the extreme exigencies of our desperate undertaking permitted – these are trifles hardly worth mentioning alongside the real difficulties.

It was only on March 22 that a latitude was determined for the first time; observations showed 85° 48′ N. The measurements were taken at −40 °F (−40 °C), yet the tables Peary had with him contained corrections only down to −10 °F (−23 °C). On March 25 Peary caught up with Bartlett's advance party (Henson was there as well). Marvin determined the latitude, obtaining 86° 38′ N. Grueling marches began on March 27: the ice was badly broken, and the sledges constantly needed repair. Yet the icy desert was not uninhabited: that day Peary noticed the tracks of two Arctic foxes, 240 miles from the nearest land. On March 29, Bartlett attempted to sound the depth of the ocean, paying out 1,260 fathoms of wire, but did not reach the bottom.

On March 30, Bartlett was sent back to base. The polar party consisted of Peary with Eskimos Egingwa and Seegloo, and Henson with Eskimos Ootah and Ooqueah. They had five sledges and 40 of the best dogs that had endured the polar distance. They carried provisions and fuel for 40 days. On April 1, Peary broke through the ice, but was unharmed: his thick sheepskin coat had not let in water, which froze on the outside. The temperature held at −25 °F (−31 °C); the weather throughout this time was calm and clear.

In his own words, Peary reached the North Pole at 10:00 a.m. on April 6, 1909. Astronomical observations were taken at 6:00 p.m. on April 6 and at 6:00 a.m. on April 7, on the assumption that they were on the meridian of Cape Columbia. Peary believed the error of his instruments did not exceed 10 miles. Before departing, he conducted a ceremony and photographed the four Eskimos and Henson holding flags. Peary's party remained at the Pole for 30 hours.

On April 8, during another attempt to sound the depth of the ocean, the wire snapped and the sounding lead was lost. The drums were discarded to lighten the load of Ooqueah, who had been carrying the sounding gear on his sledge. Throughout this time the dogs were steadily weakening (their daily ration amounted to only one pound of pemmican), and the Eskimos ate the dogs that died, boiled (Peary and Henson were averse to dog meat); by April 19 only 30 dogs remained.

I am often asked whether we were hungry during the sledge march. It's hard to answer. Morning and evening we used to eat pemmican, hardtack, and tea… If we had eaten more, we would have run short of provisions. I personally lost 25 pounds (11.3 kg) from the time of leaving the ship.

=== Return ===
By his own account, Peary reached Cape Columbia on April 23, having covered 826 miles (1,530 km) in 53 days (of which 37 days were spent on the outward journey to the Pole), across 43 marches. The remaining 90 miles to the Roosevelt were covered by Peary's party in two days. During Peary's absence, MacMillan and Borup had traveled to Cape Jesup in Greenland, where they spent 10 days studying the tides and also took 52 muskoxen. They returned to the ship on May 31. (Koryakin believed that their role was to serve as a safety net for Peary in case he had been, as in 1906, carried toward the Greenland coast.) By then summer weather had set in, the snow was melting rapidly, and steam had been raised aboard the Roosevelt from May 18. MacMillan subsequently surveyed Lady Franklin Bay, where he found caches left by the Greely expedition of 1881–1884; canned vegetables, corn, potatoes, tea, and coffee were found to be perfectly fit for consumption.

On June 16, it rained over the Roosevelt's anchorage, but the expedition did not begin its southward journey until July 18. It was decided not to follow the coast but to head straight into the ice fields. Peary arrived at Cape Sabine on August 8, where he received news that Frederick Cook had allegedly beaten him to the Pole by a year. The Roosevelt was at Etah on August 17, where further information about Cook could be obtained from Harry Whitney. (Cook himself later claimed to have left Whitney his observational records and navigational instruments.) At the same time a walrus hunt was organized, yielding 70 animals: this was the payment for the Eskimos who had worked in the expedition. The members of the polar party received boats, rifles, ammunition, and so forth. The Roosevelt delivered them to their respective home settlements.

Having received detailed accounts of Cook's expedition from Whitney, Peary and Borup proceeded to interrogate the Eskimos Ahwelah and Etukishook, who had accompanied Cook; this episode is absent from Peary's official report. The questioning was conducted by Borup who, having a poor command of the Greenlandic language, framed his questions so as to elicit a simple "yes" or "no" from the Eskimos. Notably, he kept a record of the interrogation, which was subsequently published. In Koryakin's view, Peary was interested in whether Cook had used his system and what the Eskimo place names of Ellesmere Island and northern Greenland were. This information was later used in the proceedings against Cook.

Peary left Cape York on August 26, but did not reach Indian Harbour (Labrador), where a branch of the telegraph cable was located, until September 5. On September 21 the Roosevelt returned to Sydney.

=== Marvin's death ===
Upon arriving at the Roosevelt, Peary learned of Marvin's death on April 10, 45 miles from Cape Columbia: according to his Eskimo assistants, he had allegedly drowned in a lead. Peary apparently had doubts about the drowning account, as in his expedition report he wrote that "the details of Marvin's tragic end will forever remain shrouded in darkness". The true circumstances of Marvin's death were known to his Eskimo companions; those circumstances were also learned by their fellow countryman Knud Rasmussen, but he had no grounds on which to pursue the matter. It was not until the 1950s that French ethnographer Jean Malaurie undertook an investigation into Marvin's death and established that, following a quarrel between the exhausted Eskimos and Marvin (who had not been averse to physical violence), he had been killed and his body thrown into a lead. Peary, however, had no desire to investigate.

== After the return ==
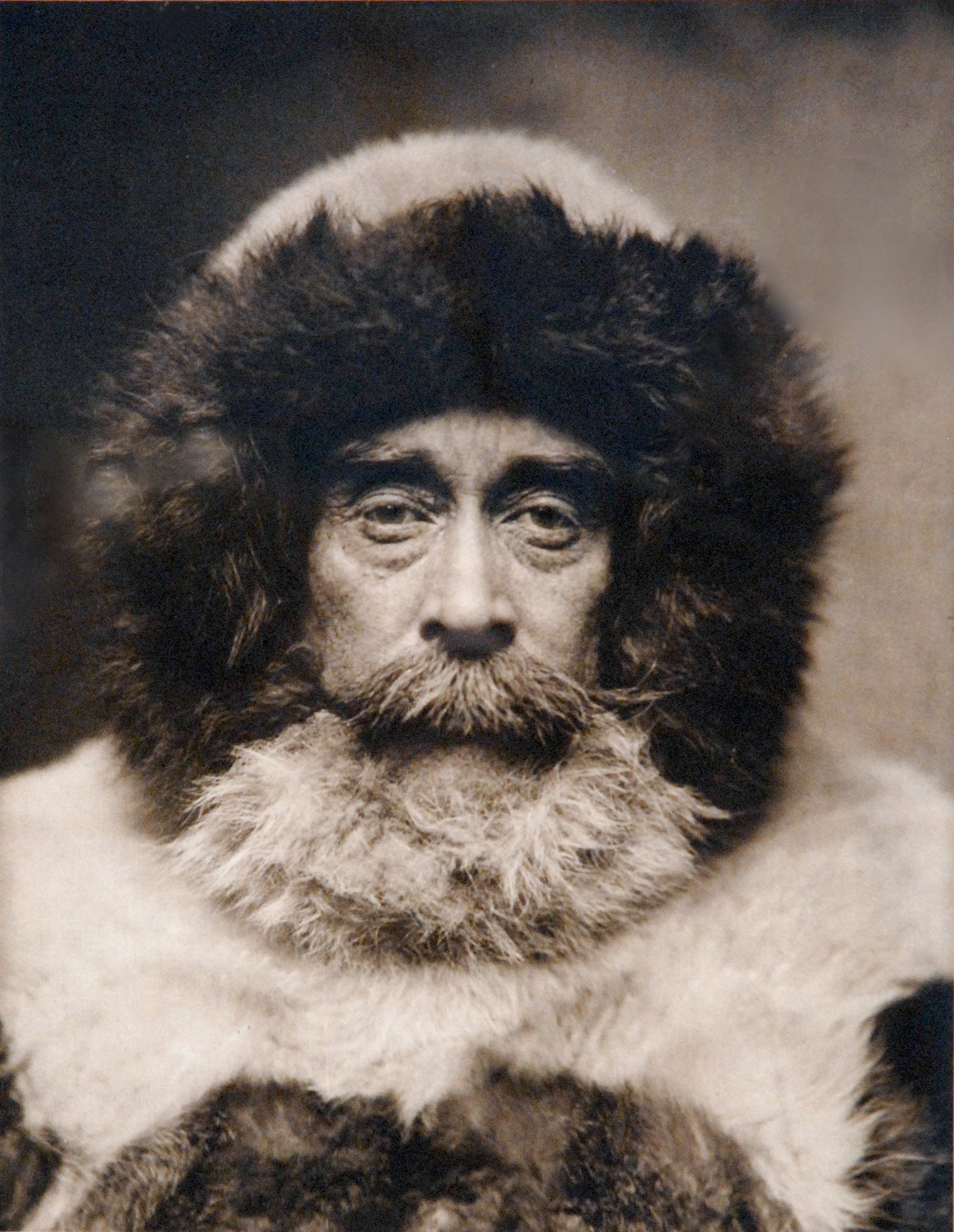
Peary in 1909, after returning from the North Pole

In Theon Wright's view, it was only in Labrador that Peary learned the details of Frederick Cook's expedition, probably from the captain of the whaling vessel Morning, who had encountered Cook in Greenland. On September 8, Peary sent a telegram to New York reading:

I've nailed the Stars and Stripes to the North Pole.

The Arctic Club stated its position regarding Cook on October 13, 1909, in articles printed by many periodicals. However, the proceedings dragged on considerably and even led Peary to appeal to the United States Congress. By a special Act of Congress dated March 30, 1911, he was formally thanked, awarded a pension of $6,000 per year, and promoted to the rank of rear admiral. He emerged victorious in the court of public opinion, and also received the $40,000 prize for the conquest of the North Pole under the will of Morris Jesup. As early as 1910, the Royal Geographical Society awarded Peary its Gold Medal and recognized him as the discoverer of the Pole.

Based on the results of the expedition, Peary published two books: The North Pole (1910) and Secrets of Polar Travel (1917). The preface to The North Pole was written by Theodore Roosevelt. Peary's own diaries remained inaccessible to researchers until 1986.

Peary's expedition made a modest contribution to geographical science. Assessing the achievements of 1908–1909, Rudolf Samoylovich wrote that the scientific yield of Peary's expedition consisted of observations of the ice in the immediate vicinity of the North Pole, meteorological observations, and tidal observations. On the great controversy between Cook and Peary, A. F. Treshnikov wrote:

After numerous disputes, Peary was officially recognized as the North Pole conqueror and Cook as a liar and fraud, although many well-known polar explorers acknowledged that the work of both Peary and Cook deserved respect, and regarded the entire scandalous dispute over the priority of conquering the North Pole as harmful to science. As a result, not only Cook's integrity but also Peary's achievements were called into question. Even the special committee of the United States Congress, when examining in 1916 the question of conferring upon Peary the rank of rear admiral, did not establish his priority in the discovery of the North Pole, but sidestepped the issue, noting Peary's achievements in Arctic exploration. Specialists repeatedly and carefully reviewed the positional determinations of Peary and Cook in order to establish whether they had actually been at the North Pole. It was concluded that both Cook and Peary had possessed comparatively primitive instruments for astronomical determinations and navigational instruments for dead reckoning. Moreover, neither of the two possessed extensive knowledge of navigation. And if one poses the specific question of whether they were at the exact point of the North Pole, the answer may be in the negative.

== Modern critics and controversies ==
=== Wally Herbert's position ===
While the Peary–Cook dispute in the first half of the 20th century largely left Peary's reputation unquestioned, toward the end of the 20th and the beginning of the 21st century, following Cook's rehabilitation, doubts began to be raised about the veracity of Peary's own claims. The first to openly question Peary's achievement was the British polar explorer Wally Herbert, who in 1968–1969 crossed the entire Arctic from Point Barrow to Svalbard with four dog teams over 476 days, reaching the North Pole on April 6, 1969 – the 60th anniversary of Peary's claimed attainment. In his book Across the Top of the World, Herbert wrote that Peary averaged 34 miles per day on the way to the Pole and 46 miles per day on the return. Only 10% of his time was spent circumventing obstacles, whereas in his previous expeditions Peary had taken this factor to be 25%. His immediate predecessor Umberto Cagni averaged no more than 6.3 miles per day, with his best single day's march amounting to 21.2 miles.

The National Geographic Society subsequently commissioned Herbert to write a biography of Peary; published in 1989, The Noose of Laurels caused something of a scandal, as Herbert, drawing on his own expeditionary experience and Peary's records, concluded that Peary could not have reached the North Pole and had falsified his measurement data. According to Herbert, Peary fell short of the Pole by about 50 miles (80 km). Herbert's conclusions gained numerous supporters. This view was endorsed by the Canadian historian Pierre Berton and by science writer Bruce Henderson.

In 1996, Robert M. Bryce published the work Cook and Peary: The Polar Controversy, Resolved. His conclusion: neither Cook nor Peary had reached the Pole, and Peary still had some 160 km left to travel when he turned back.

=== Simulation of Peary's expedition in 2005 ===
In 2005, British explorer Tom Avery recreated Peary's expedition using the same equipment and Eskimo dogs. Setting out from Cape Columbia, he reached the North Pole having covered 765 km (413 nautical miles) in 36 days and 22 hours, even beating Peary's schedule by five hours. The team was, however, returned by aircraft. The journey is the subject of the book To the End of the Earth (published in 2009). Nevertheless, critics argue that Avery's journey only deepens the uncertainty surrounding Peary's legacy rather than settling the matter. The problem is that Avery failed to match the speeds described by Peary, with his maximum single-day distance not exceeding 70 km. Furthermore, Avery was losing up to 11 km per day to southward ice drift and did not experience the five-day delay that Peary had encountered.

=== V. S. Koryakin's view ===
In 2002, the Russian glaciologist and historian of polar exploration V. S. Koryakin published a biography of Frederick Cook in which he argued for Cook's priority in the polar race. Nonetheless, Koryakin had no doubt that Peary had likewise reached the North Pole. He also offers an explanation for the pace of Peary's travel across the drifting ice: the experienced navigator Robert Bartlett had brought him to the final straight, and after the captain's party departed Peary had 38 dogs for a sprint of 133 miles (250 km), with the total load not exceeding 200 kg – in other words, there was a tenfold gap between the standard load of a sled dog (up to 40 kg) and the actual load. In Koryakin's view, this was a kind of showpiece designed to demonstrate the superiority of the "Peary system", and Peary conquered the Pole with significantly less expenditure of effort and resources.

Koryakin also explains Peary's successful return along the old trail: it appears he managed to find himself in the main current of an active stream: the northern branch of a circular anticyclonic drift. Confirmation of this is found in Peary's diaries, in which he describes wide leads covered with thin young ice. An explanation is also offered for the near-total absence of descriptions of the route:

Nothing could stop this men and dog teams "machine", launched at full power and called by its inventor the "Peary system". It advanced both northward and southward at such a pace that its organizer had no time for scientific observations or for contemplating the surrounding landscape. […] Apart from the main trophy – the Pole – his rapid dash to 90° N and back brought no practical benefit to anyone, but left behind a great many puzzles, above all concerning the length of the daily marches by dog sled, which have never been surpassed by any subsequent expedition or adventurer.

== Bibliography ==
=== Primary sources ===
- Henson, Matthew A. (1912). A Negro Explorer at the North Pole. with a foreword by Robert E. Peary. New York: Frederick A. Stokes – via Internet Archive.
- MacMillan, Donald B. (1934). How Peary Reached the Pole. Boston and New York: Houghton Mifflin – via Internet Archive.
- Peary, Robert E. (1910). The North Pole, Its Discovery in 1909 under the Auspices of the Peary Arctic Club. with an introduction by Theodore Roosevelt; and foreword by Gilbert Hovey Grosvenor. New York: Frederick A. Stokes – via Internet Archive.
  - Peary, R. (1972). Р. Пири. Северный полюс; Р. Амундсен. Южный полюс [R. Peary. The North Pole; R. Amundsen. The South Pole]. Translated from English by V. A. Smirnov; afterword and commentary by A. F. Treshnikov. Moscow: Mysl. pp. 5–248.
- Peary, Robert E. (1917). Secrets of Polar Travel. New York: The Century Co. – via Internet Archive.

=== Monographs ===
- Anderson, Harry S. (2010). Exploring the Polar Regions (Revised ed.). New York: Chelsea House.
- Bryce, Robert M. (1997). Cook and Peary: The Polar Controversy, Resolved. Mechanicsburg, Pennsylvania: Stackpole Books. p. 1152. ISBN 0-689-12034-6.
- Herbert, Wally (1972). Пешком через Ледовитый океан [Across the Arctic Ocean on Foot] (in Russian). Translated from English by T. L. Rovinskaya. Moscow: Mysl. p. 188.
- Koryakin, V. S. (2002). Фредерик Альберт Кук, 1865—1940 [Frederick Albert Cook, 1865–1940]. Scientific-Biographical Literature (in Russian). Moscow: Nauka. p. 248. ISBN 5-02-022730-7.
- Mills, William J. (2003). Exploring Polar Frontiers: A Historical Encyclopedia. Santa Barbara, California: ABC-CLIO. ISBN 1-57607-423-4.
- Mooney, James L. (1976). Dictionary of American Naval Fighting Ships. Vol. 6. Government Printing Office.
- Nobile, U. (1984). Крылья над полюсом [Wings over the Pole] (in Russian). Translated by A. A. Chernov, E. A. Chernova. Mysl.
- Samoylovich, R. L. (1933). Путь к полюсу [The Road to the Pole] (in Russian). Leningrad: Publishing House of the All-Union Arctic Institute.
- Schweikart, Larry (1986). "Polar Revisionism and the Peary Claim: The Diary of Robert E. Peary". The Historian. 48 (3): 341–358. doi:10.1111/j.1540-6563.1986.tb00698.x. ISSN 0018-2370.
- Sunnes, T. B. (1991). «Fram»: приключения полярных экспедиций ["Fram": Adventures of the Polar Expeditions]. Remarkable Ships (in Russian). Translated from German by A. L. Makovkin. Leningrad: Sudostroenie. p. 272. ISBN 5-7355-0120-8.
- Treshnikov, A. F. (1972). "Robert Peary and the Conquest of the North Pole". Пири Р. Северный полюс. Амундсен Р. Южный полюс [Peary R. The North Pole. Amundsen R. The South Pole] (in Russian). Moscow: Mysl. pp. 225–242.
- Wright, Theon (1973). Большой гвоздь [The Big Nail] (in Russian). Translated from English. Leningrad: Gidrometeoizdat. p. 288.
