= Kevin Andrews (writer) =

American archaeologist and poet (1924–1989)

Roy Kevin Andrews (January 20, 1924 – September 1, 1989) was an American philhellene, writer and archaeologist.

== Early life and education ==
Roy Kevin Andrews was born a U.S. citizen in Peking. His mother was Yvette Borup Andrews, but the name of his father was concealed for many years. Yvette was married to Roy Chapman Andrews at the time of Kevin's birth, but the first man to visit her to see the newborn son was not Roy Chapman Andrews, but Harold St Clair (Chips) Smallwood. On the eve of Kevin's marriage, nearly 30 years later, Yvette announced to Kevin that Smallwood, and not Roy Chapman Andrews, was his father. This was to have a fundamental and shattering effect on Kevin who constantly and incessantly obsessed on his own identity.

His mother's ancestors included George A. Brandreth, Aaron Ward, and Elkanah Watson, all prominent in New York business and politics. Kevin Andrews was schooled in England at Stowe, where he learned classical Greek. He served for three years as a private in the US Army seeing action in Italy. After graduating from Harvard in 1947 he entered for a travelling fellowship in Athens, and his future life in Greece was decided by chance when he was successful; as he said "the award ... was fortuitous since no one else applied for it, and is relevant only as the reason why I went to Greece in the first place."

== Arrival in Greece ==
After a month spent on Paros helping Greek-American friends with the grape-harvest, Andrews arrived in the autumn of 1947 at the American School of Classical Studies at Athens. It was a time of civil war, the rate of inflation was high and the Greek people were suffering extreme hardship. He was unfortunate and suffered from an "obscure nervous disorder", which turned out to be epilepsy, and spent much of his first winter in a miserable draughty room. Travel on the mainland was severely restricted; a permit was needed to travel more than a few miles from Athens. It could also be dangerous. A few days after the students had visited Mycenae, Kenneth Matthews, an English journalist, was kidnapped there. Some travelers were unlucky and George Polk, a US reporter, was captured in the mountains and his body was washed up soon afterwards near Salonika. After a disappointing stay in Greece, Andrews was preparing to leave when he was offered a Fulbright Fellowship to stay and carry out a study of the castles and fortifications built by various invaders in the Peloponnese. This offered a field unresearched by others and the freedom to travel alone, and so he accepted with delight.

== Traveler in the Peloponnese ==
Andrews spent the long summers of 1948 to 1951 travelling around the Peloponnese, the winters writing up in Athens. His journeys and the people he met are described vividly in The Flight of Ikaros (published 1959, reissued 1969 and 1984), "one of the great and lasting books about Greece." As this overlapped with the Greek Civil War and its aftermath, it was a time of mistrust, particularly of foreigners (and especially of one making plans and notes in the hills), but he soon gained the trust of country people on both sides of the conflict. He became friends with a shepherd in the Geraneia (Γεράνεια) hills and become his child's koumbaros or member of the family and godfather. His time in Greece closed with an ascent of Mount Olympus, described in the book, the first by a westerner since the outbreak of the civil war. The fruit of his work, Castles of the Morea, was published in 1953 (reissued 2006).

He returned to the US only to feel an exile, after failing to get a job connected with US aid in Greece. Greece was in the process of reconstruction and the domestic politics were dominated by America, left-wing politics was banned and many activists were shot or placed in camps. During this period he met Nancy Thayer, E.E. Cummings's daughter, who was married to Andrews's friend Willard Roosevelt at the time. Andrews married Nancy in 1954 and the next year moved to Europe with her first two children, eventually settling in Athens. The couple later had two children of their own, Ioanna and Alexis. In 1968, the couple separated, and she and her children moved to London because, according to Andrews's biographer Roger Jinkinson, "she did not want to live under the Junta nor have her children brought up in a police state"; she kept the name Nancy T. Andrews and hoped they could someday reconcile.

== Later writing ==
Back in Greece Kevin Andrews's next publication Athens was published in 1967. It was a counterblast against a westernized Greece which had been sanitized for the tourist. Protest had to be guarded and he waited until the departure of the Junta in 1974 before plain writing about political matters was possible. Writings in this period included an essay on Louis MacNeice and a lengthy autobiographical poem published in book form, called First Will and Testament. In 1975 he relinquished his US citizenship and became naturalized as a Greek. Athens Alive followed in 1980, it is a book of writings about Athens from Ovid in AD 7 to Cavafy and Hemingway in the 20th century.

In 1988, Andrews met Elizabeth Boleman-Herring in Athens. In the late summer of 1989 they traveled to Kythira, an island off the southern tip of the Peloponnese. On September 1, they walked to Cape Trachylos at the southern end of the island, Andrews started a swim to Χύτρα/Αυγό, a rocky islet 2km distant with a notable cave. He drowned and his body was recovered the next day.

== Published works ==
- Castles of the Morea, (1953), (Gennadeion Monograph 4), Princeton, NJ.
- The Flight of Ikaros: a journey into Greece, (1959), London: Weidenfeld and Nicolson.
- Athens, (1967), London: Phoenix House.
- The Flight of Ikaros, (1969), Bath: Cedric Chivers Ltd.
- (essay on Louis MacNeice).
- First Will and Testament, (poem).
- First Will and Testament, (1974), Athens: privately.
- Athens Alive : The practical tourist's companion to the fall of man, (1979), Athens: Hermes.
- Greece in the Dark : 1967-1974, (1980), Amsterdam: Hakkert. ISBN 90-256-0785-3.
- Byzantine Blues: A cradle-song for neodemocracy, (1980), unknown.
- The Flight of Ikaros: travels in Greece during a civil war, (1984), Harmondsworth, Middlesex: Penguin Books. ISBN 0-14-009531-4.
- Castles of the Morea, (2006), (Gennadius Monograph IV), Athens: American School of Classical Studies at Athens. ISBN 0-87661-406-3.
- The Flight of Ikaros: travels in Greece during the civil war, (2010), Philadelphia: Paul Dry Books. ISBN 978-1-58988-064-1.

== Bibliography ==
- Andrews, Kevin, (1959), The Flight of Ikaros: a journey into Greece, London: Weidenfeld and Nicolson.
- Leigh Fermor, Patrick, (1980), Interfering in Greece: review of Athens Alive London: Times Literary Supplement in Cooper, Artemis, ed., (2003), Words of Mercury, London: John Murray.
- Jinkinson, Roger (2010), American Ikaros (biography)
