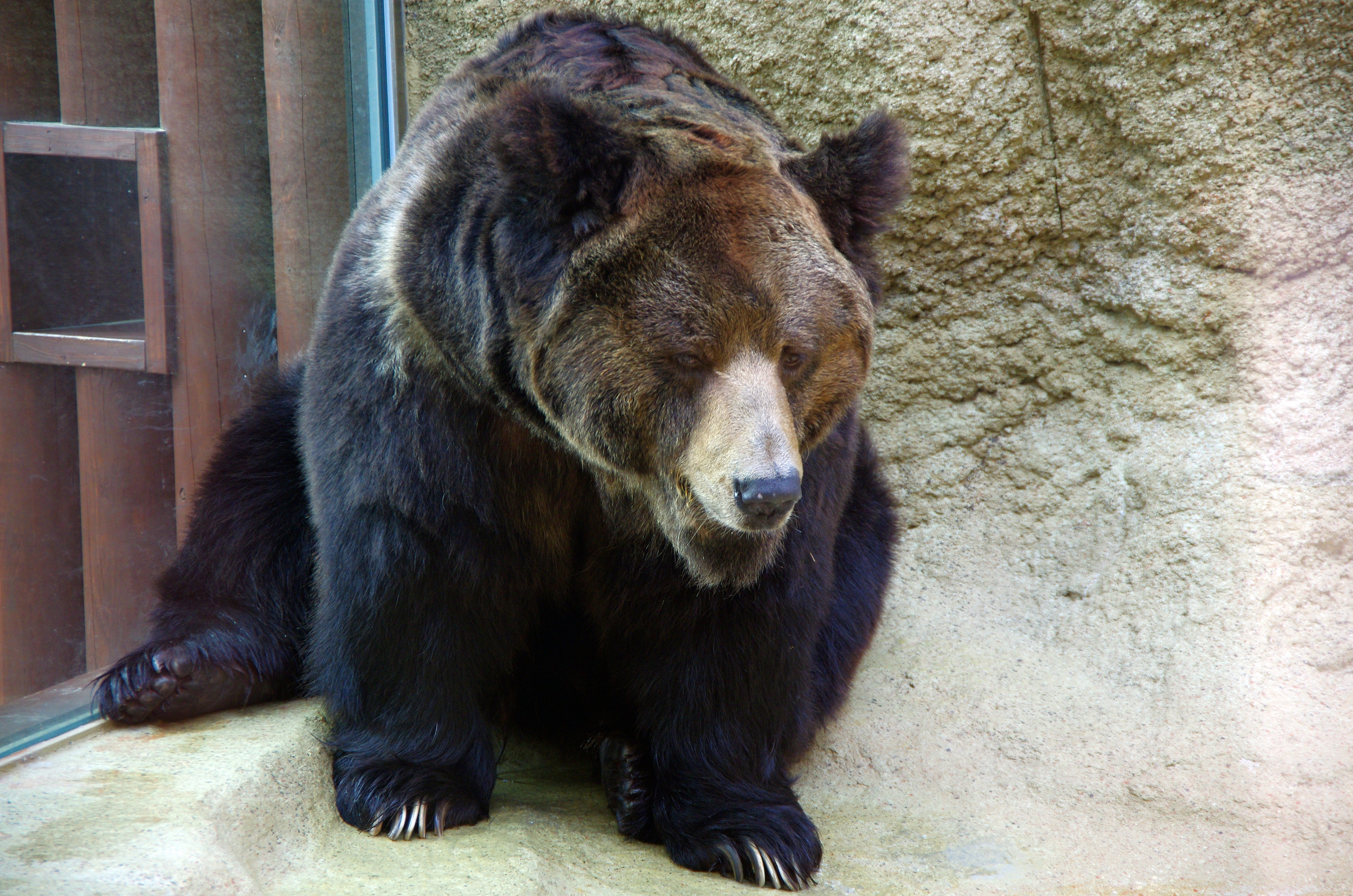
- Tibetan blue bear at the Oji Zoo, Japan.

Conservation status
- CITES Appendix II

Scientific classification
- Kingdom: Animalia
- Phylum: Chordata
- Class: Mammalia
- Order: Carnivora
- Family: Ursidae
- Genus: Ursus
- Species: U. arctos
- Subspecies: U. a. pruinosus

Trinomial name
- Ursus arctos pruinosus Blyth, 1854

= Tibetan blue bear =

Subspecies of carnivore

The Tibetan brown bear (Ursus arctos pruinosus), also known as Tibetan blue bear, is a subspecies of the brown bear (Ursus arctos) in the eastern Tibetan Plateau.

One of the rarest subspecies of bear in the world, the blue bear is rarely sighted in the wild. First classified in 1851, it was once known in the Western world only through a small number of fur and bone samples. However, the 2021 French documentary The Velvet Queen (La Panthère des Neiges) did manage to capture extensive footage of the reclusive animal.

== Common names ==
Tibetan blue bear is also known as the Himalayan blue bear, Himalayan snow bear, Tibetan brown bear, and the horse bear. In Tibetan, it is known as Dom gyamuk.

== Taxonomy ==
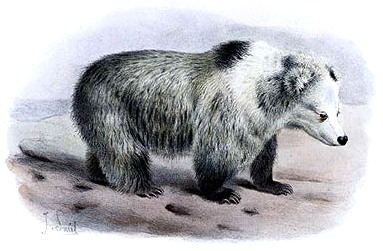
Illustration of a Tibetan blue bear by Joseph Smit

The Gobi bear is sometimes classified as being of the same subspecies as the Tibetan blue bear; this is based on morphological similarities, and the belief that the desert-dwelling Gobi bear represents a relict population of the blue bear. However, the Gobi bear is sometimes classified as its own subspecies, and closely resembles other Asian brown bears.

== Distribution and habitat ==
It is possible that the occasional specimen might be observed traveling through high mountain peaks during times of reduced food supply, or in search of a mate. However, the limited information available about the habits and range of the blue bear makes such speculation difficult to confirm.

== Conservation ==
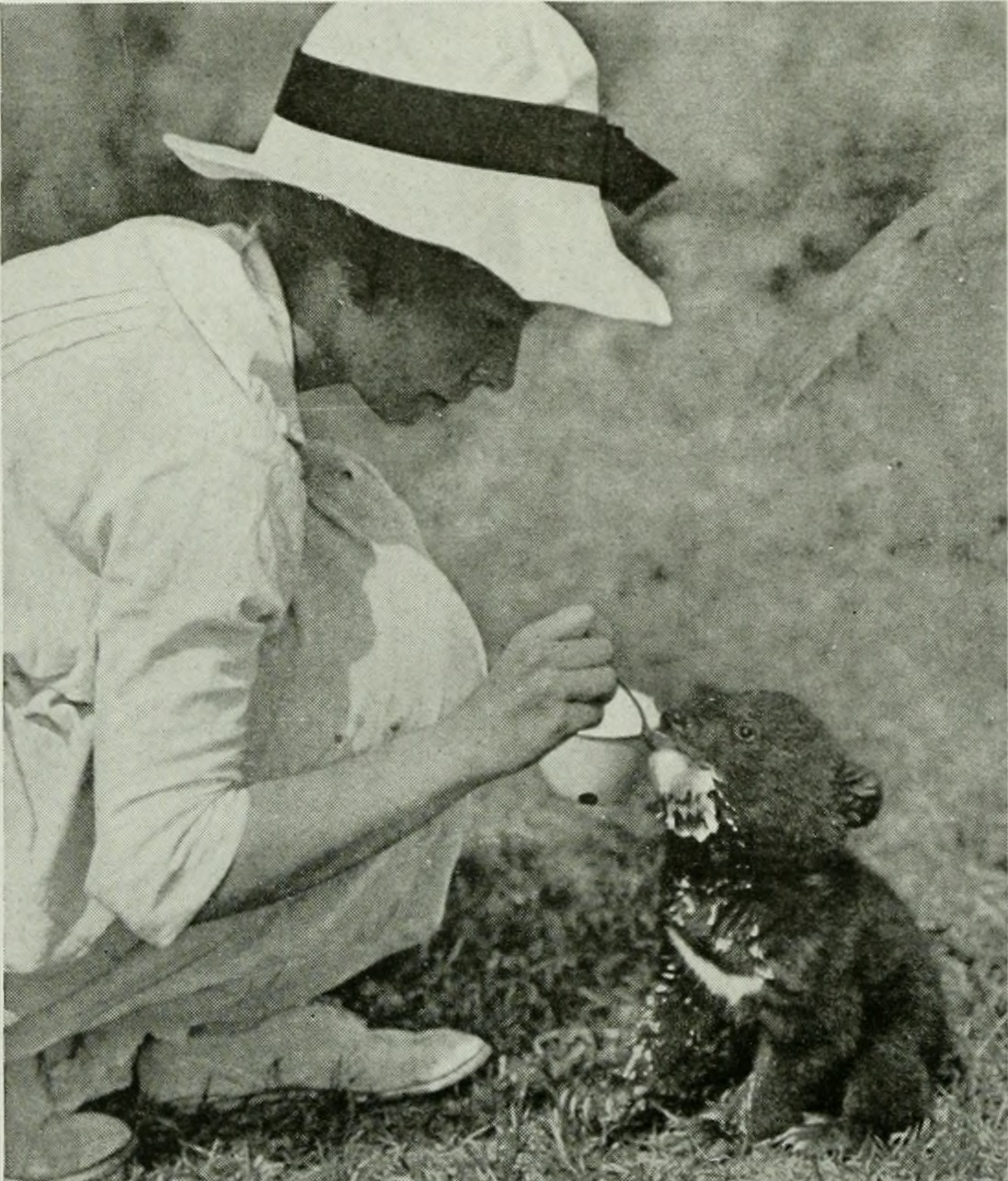
Mrs. Yvette Borup Andrews feeding a Tibetan bear cub in 1917

The exact conservation status of the blue bear is unknown, due to limited information. However, in the United States, trading blue bear specimens or products is restricted by the Endangered Species Act. It is also listed in Appendix I of the Convention on International Trade in Endangered Species (CITES) as a protected species. It is threatened by the use of bear bile in traditional Chinese medicine and habitat encroachment.

== In culture ==
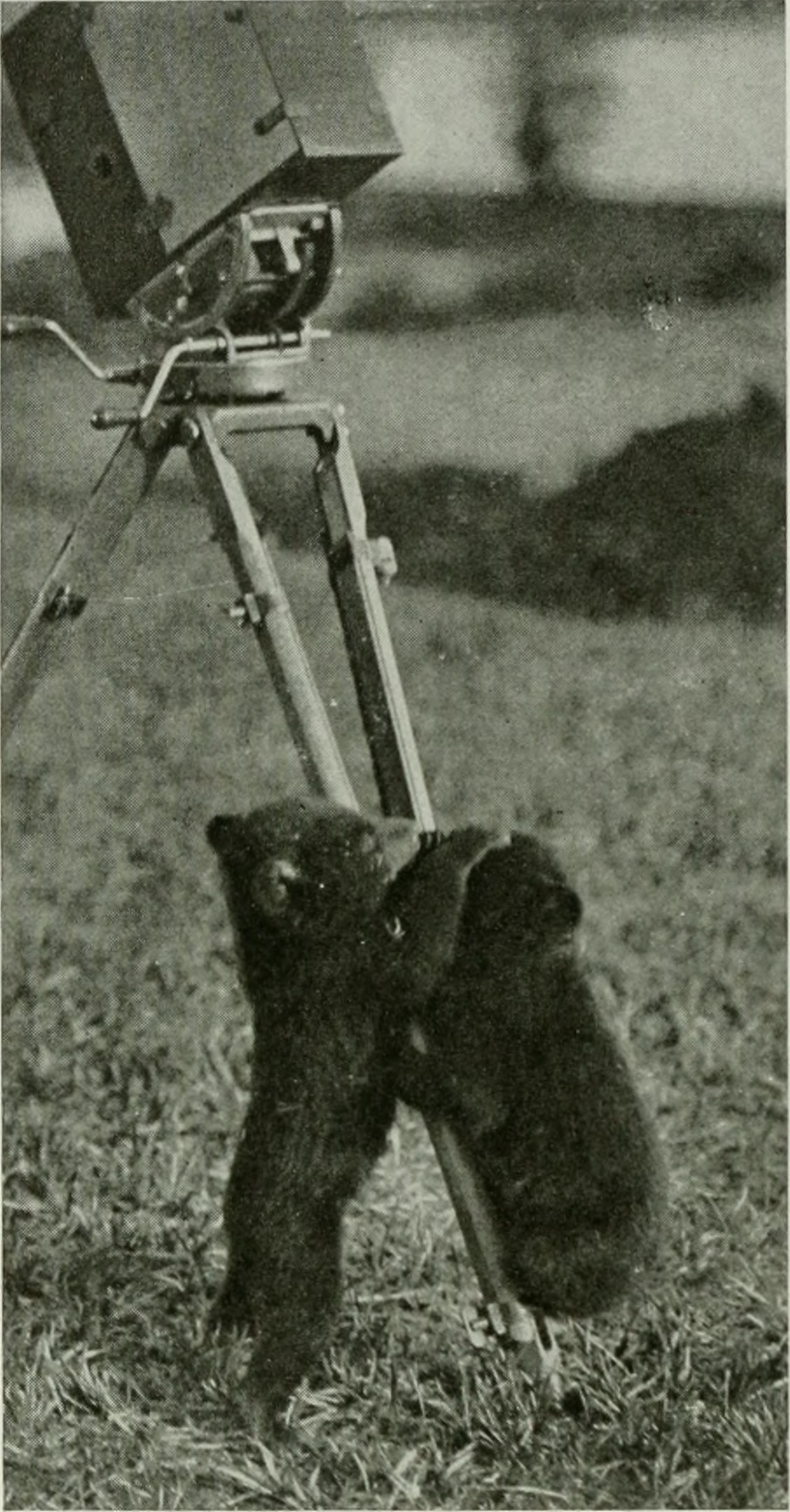
1917 photo of two Tibetan bear cubs playing

The blue bear is notable for having been suggested as one possible inspiration for the yeti. A 1960 expedition to search for evidence of the yeti, led by Sir Edmund Hillary, returned with two scraps of fur that had been identified by locals as 'yeti fur' that were later scientifically identified as being portions of the pelt of a blue bear.
