= Yvette Borup Andrews =

American explorer and scientific illustrator (1891–1959)

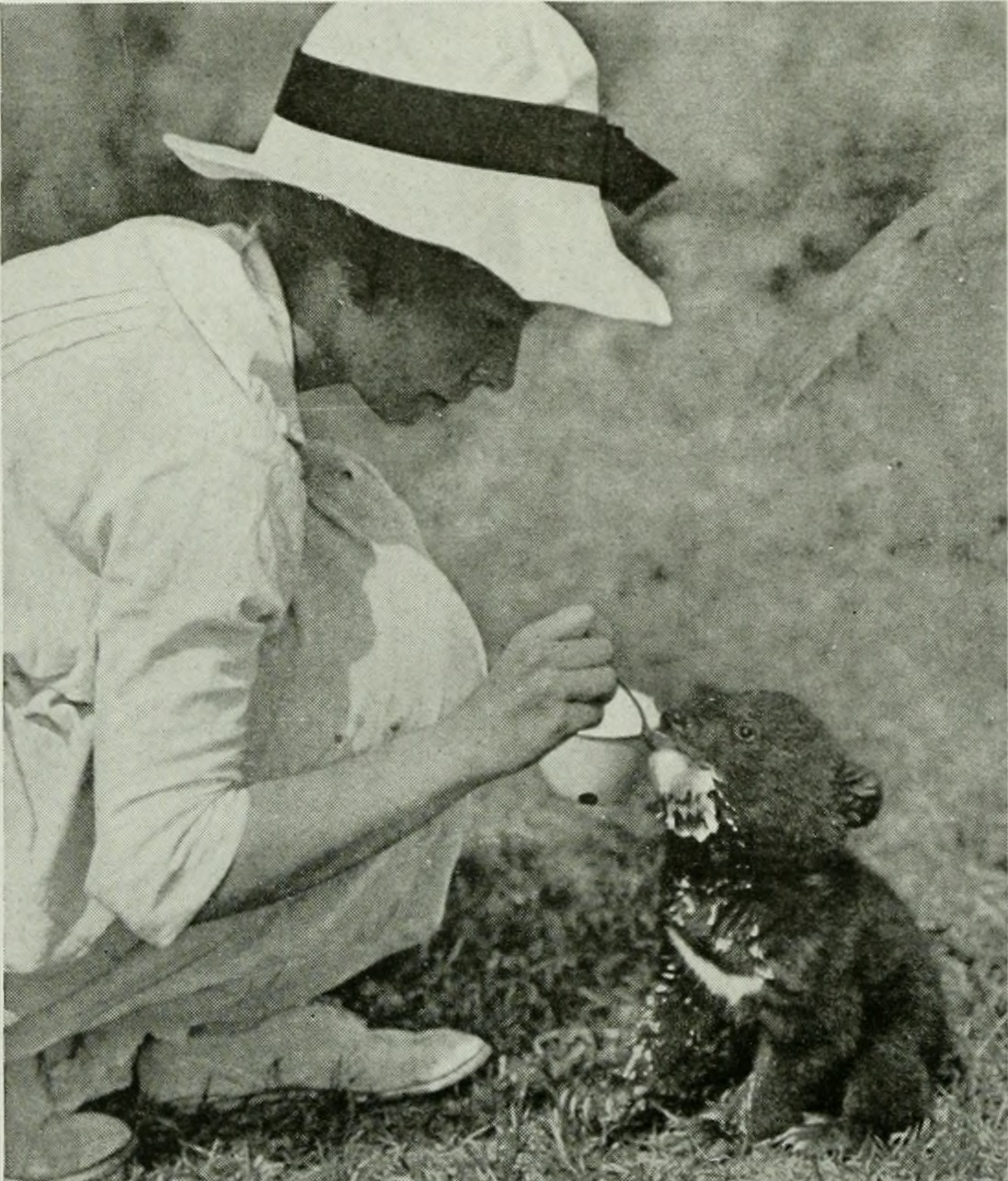
- Yvette Borup Andrews, feeding a Tibetan blue bear cub in 1917
- Born: Yvette Huen Borup; February 28, 1891; Paris, France
- Died: April 12, 1959 (aged 68); Burgos, Spain
- Occupation: photographer
- Years active: 1910s–1920s
- Known for: photographing Central Asia for the American Museum of Natural History

Yvette Borup Andrews (February 28, 1891 – April 12, 1959) was an American photographer associated with the American Museum of Natural History. With the museum's director, Roy Chapman Andrews, she traveled to Central Asia twice during 1916–18 for the museum's First and Second Asiatic Zoological Expeditions.

== Early life ==
Yvette Huen Borup was born in Paris to American parents, Henry Dana Borup (1854–1916) and Mary Watson Brandreth Borup (1854–1897). Her father was an American military attaché in Paris and Berlin before World War I. Her maternal grandfather, George A. Brandreth, and her great-grandfather, Congressman Aaron Ward, were both New York politicians. Her great-great-grandfather, Elkanah Watson, was a notable New York businessman. Her older brother George Borup was an assistant to Robert Peary on the North Pole Expedition, and wrote a book about his experiences in the Arctic. Yvette Borup was educated in France, Germany, Italy, and New York. One of her school friends at the Kaiserin Auguste Institute was Princess Victoria Louise of Prussia.

== Career ==
Yvette Borup Andrews was an ethnographic photographer and filmmaker for the American Museum of Natural History. She was the photographer assigned to the museum's First Asiatic Zoological Expedition (1916–1917), to China, Tibet, and Burma, and the Second Asiatic Zoological Expedition (1918), to Mongolia and North China, both expeditions led by her husband. She developed her still images and films in a portable "rubber darkroom" in the field. In the 1920s she was again in the field with Andrews, as photographer on the museum's Central Asiatic Expeditions. On that trip, she photographed the last Maidari Festival in Ulaanbaatar, creating a valuable historical document of the custom.

Her photographs were published in Camps and Trails in China (1918), a book she co-authored with her husband. More photographs by Andrews appeared in Across Mongolian Plains (1921). Soon after their 1931 divorce, Roy Chapman Andrews told an audience that "Physically and intellectually, women may be the equals of men for the work of exploration, but temperamentally they are not. They do not stand up under the little daily annoyances that loom large to them in the somewhat trying work involved on an expedition. The trivialities which men can ignore completely disturb them and prevent them from settling down to hard and conscientious work." The Society of Woman Geographers objected to his observations.

In 1940, she was active with the Committee to Defend America by Aiding the Allies, volunteering as a "Minute Woman" at a phone bank to build support for the United States' entry into World War II.

== Personal life ==
Yvette Borup married naturalist Roy Chapman Andrews (1884–1960) in 1914; he was an acquaintance of her late brother. She had two sons. The father of George Borup Andrews (1917–2007) was Roy Chapman Andrews but, although Yvette was married to Roy Chapman Andrews at the time of the birth of her second son, Roy Kevin Andrews (1924–1989), the first man to visit her to see the newborn son was not Roy Chapman Andrews, but Harold St Clair (Chips) Smallwood. On the eve of Kevin's marriage nearly 30 years later, Yvette announced to Kevin that Smallwood, and not Roy Chapman Andrews was his father. Yvette and Roy Chapman Andrews were divorced in 1931. She died in a 1959 traffic accident, near Bahabón de Esgueva, in the province of Burgos, Spain, aged 68 years.
