= Ross Gilmore Marvin =

American Arctic explorer

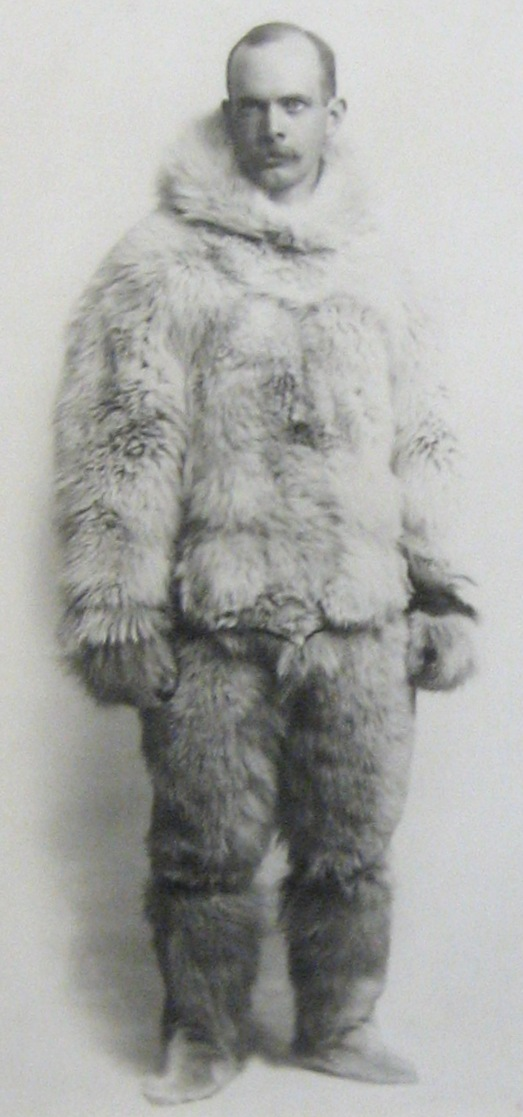
- Marvin in Arctic outerware
- Born: January 28, 1880; Elmira, New York, U.S.
- Disappeared: after December 8, 1908
- Died: April 10, 1909 (aged 29) near Cape Columbia, Canada
- Education: Cornell University, New York Nautical School
- Occupation: College instructor
- Known for: Arctic exploration with Robert Peary
- Awards: Peary Polar Expedition Medal

Ross Gilmore Marvin (January 28, 1880 – after December 8, 1908; reported as April 10, 1909) (Note: December 8, 1908, was the date of Marvin's final entry in his diary. April 10, 1909, was Marvin's date of death as reported by Peary.) was an American explorer who took part in Robert Peary's 1905–1906 and 1908–1909 expeditions to the Arctic. It was initially believed that Marvin drowned during the second expedition, but an Inuk member of the expedition later stated he shot and killed Marvin.

== Early years ==
Marvin was born in Elmira, New York, on January 28, 1880, to Mary J. Marvin and Edward Marvin. He was the youngest of six children, and was five years old when his father died. Marvin was educated in Elmira in the public school system at Beecher School. In 1899, he graduated from the Elmira Free Academy, and in fall of that year he entered Cornell University, where he earned a Bachelor of Arts degree in 1905. He also studied navigation on the training ship St. Mary's of the New York Nautical School, traveling to Europe and northern Africa.

== Polar expeditions ==
=== First expedition ===
Marvin took part in the Peary expedition of 1905–1906, shortly after graduating from Cornell. Marvin was very eager to join the expedition, because he felt that it was his life's work. While failing to reach the North Pole, Peary asserted to have traveled father north than anyone. Marvin committed to accompany Peary on his next expedition.

After his return, Marvin became engaged, with plans to marry after his second expedition with Peary. Starting in January 1907, Marvin taught mathematics at Mercersburg Academy in Pennsylvania, and in September 1907 he joined the faculty at Cornell University as an instructor in mathematics and astronomy. He took a leave of absence from this post in order to participate in Peary's 1908–1909 expedition.

=== Second expedition ===
Marvin was given the role of chief scientist and keeper of the ship's log. He would record the day-to-day activities of the men, and of the general conditions that the men had to face while headed toward the arctic, which included the weather. Marvin kept a journal of his days on the ice, however the entries began to dwindle as the expedition went on. His last journal entry was on December 8, 1908. On this journey, they were better equipped. They had “seven explorers, 17 picked Eskimos, 133 of the best dogs in Greenland and 19 sledges.” (Note: Specific counts of the expedition's makeup vary by source.) There was a main group and there were smaller groups. The smaller groups would break off from the main group and go ahead to establish camps for the main group. While Peary set out to reach the North Pole, Marvin was left behind as part of a staged support team. His partners were two Inuit men, Kudlookto (Note: Kudlookto may appear as Kudlooktoo or similar variants.) and a younger cousin. (Note: The younger Inuk, Inukitsoq (spelling varies), was nicknamed "Harrigan" by members of the expedition.) After Peary left Marvin with his two Inuit companions, Peary never saw Marvin alive again.

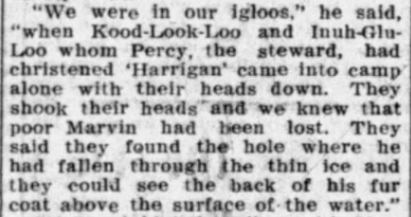
Account by Robert Peary of the death of Marvin as published in September 1909

==== Death ====
Marvin was originally believed to have drowned, as Kudlookto reported that Marvin's body was discovered after he fell through thin ice. Peary subsequently sent a telegram to Elmira reporting, "Drowned April 10, 1909 45 mile north of Cape Columbia while returning from 86 degrees 38 minutes North Latitude." However, Kudlookto stated in 1926 that he had shot and killed Marvin, either because Marvin had started acting irrationally, or because Marvin refused to let Kudlookto's cousin rest—sources differ. In 1954, Peary's daughter stated that she believed Marvin drowned, and discounted Kudlookto's story.

== Legacy ==
Peary's expedition placed a brass tablet on a cairn in memorial to Marvin at Cape Sheridan on Ellesmere Island. The uninhabited Marvin Islands within the Quttinirpaaq National Park are named in his honor. A memorial tablet for Marvin was added to the Sage Chapel at Cornell University during the 1920s; fellow-explorer Richard E. Byrd visited the memorial in 1927.

The SS Ross G. Marvin, an American Liberty ship named in his honor, was built and launched in 1943. (Note: See List of Liberty ships (M–R).) John M. Carmody, chair of the ship-naming committee within the United States Maritime Commission, had attended school with Marvin in Elmira. The ship was transferred to Britain under the Lend-Lease program, where it was renamed Samtroy in 1944. It was again renamed in 1947, as Edenbank, was transferred to Chinese ownership in 1960, and reported as scrapped in 1987.

The Peary Polar Expedition Medal, authorized by the United States Congress in 1944, was awarded to six people including Marvin; his family received his medal in 1949. A booklet about Marvin, entitled A Tragedy in the Arctic and written by James Vinton Stowell of the Chemung County Historical Society, was published in 1954.

A large boulder with a plaque commemorating Marvin was dedicated in his home town of Elmira in 1910; it has been located at the intersection of Lake Street and Church Street in Elmira since 1989. Marvin is remembered at the State University of New York Maritime College (formerly the New York Nautical School) in the Bronx, New York City, where a new four-story wing was named after him in 1967, with a commemorative plaque dedicated in May 1968. The 1967 addition is now part of the Marvin Tode Science and Engineering Building.
