= George Borup =

American explorer (1885–1912)

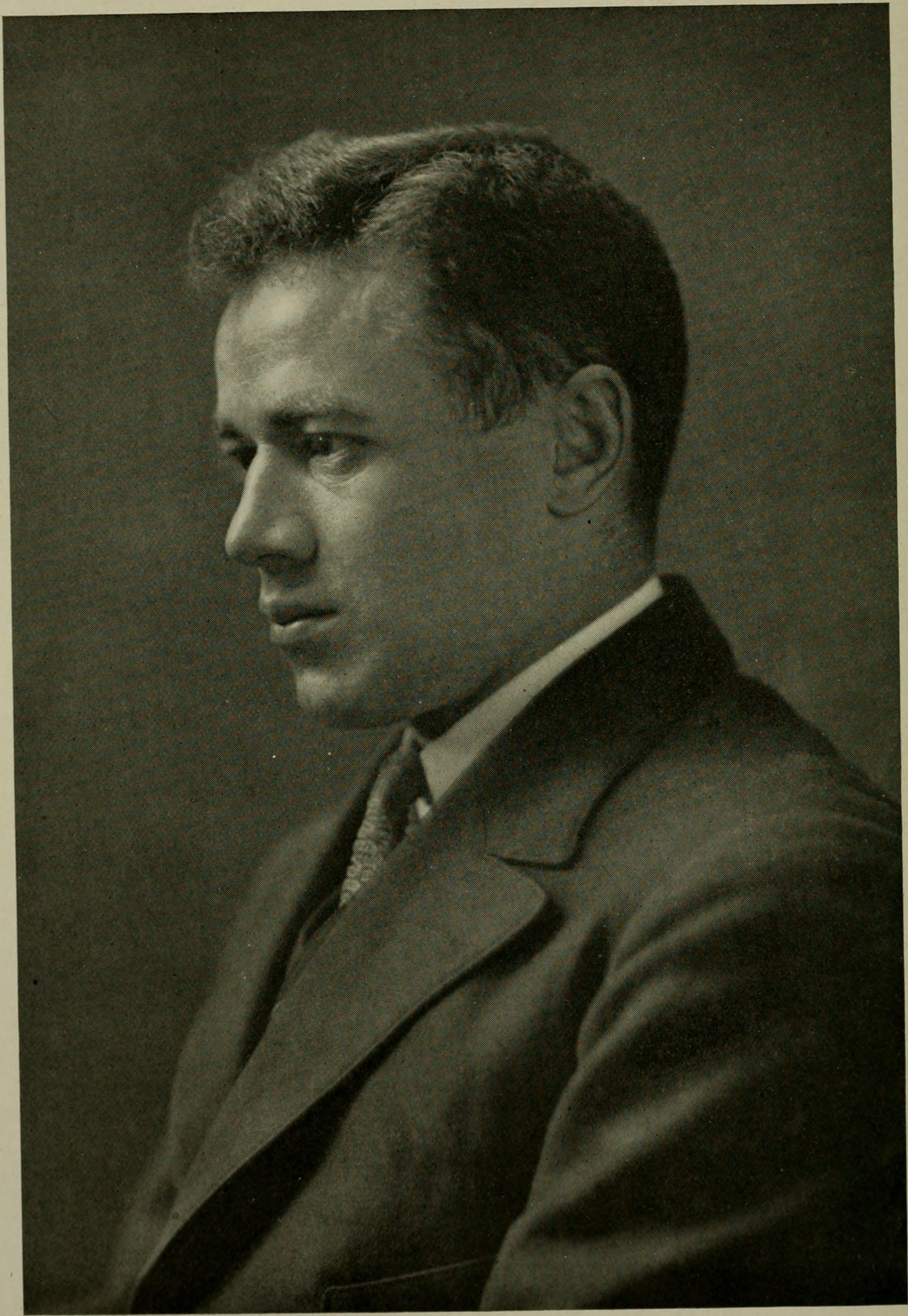
George Borup

George Brandreth Borup (September 2, 1885 – April 28, 1912) was an American explorer, paleontologist and curator. He is best known for his service in 1908-1909 with senior explorer Robert Peary, during which he assisted Peary’s march over a portion of the Arctic Ocean.

== Biography ==
=== Early life ===
Borup was born in Ossining, New York, the grandson of George Brandreth and the brother of Yvette Borup Andrews. After majoring in geology, he graduated from Yale College in 1907.

=== North Pole expedition ===
Borup applied for and, with Peary’s assent, earned a space in the United States polar explorer’s SS Roosevelt. This icebreaker would be the base of Peary’s expedition northward to Nares Strait and the adjacent Ellesmere Island, which Peary hoped would be a jumping-off point for his goal, the North Pole.

Although he was inexperienced, Borup’s work performance convinced the senior explorer to assign him to additional duties. Borup became the subcommander of Peary’s advance supporting party, a four-man group – Borup and three Inuit, Keshunghaw, Seegloo, and Karko – who were assigned to break trail and leave supply depots ready in wait for Peary’s polar party. On February 28, 1909, the Borup team left Cape Columbia to sledge over the Arctic Ocean icecap.

After making 136 geographical miles northward to a location on the icecap of 85 degrees 23 minutes north, Borup and his exhausted expedition mates were ordered south on March 20, 1909. They had been heading northward for 21 days. Peary’s Pole-bound party still had 277 geographical miles to go in order to reach their goal. Borup and his party returned to the SS Roosevelt on April 11, 1909.

When Peary and his team returned to the same ship on April 26, 1909, with a report that they had reached the Pole on April 6 and April 7, 1909, Borup and the ship’s officers and men rejoiced at the news. One reason for subsequent skepticism of Peary’s North Pole claim has centered on the comparative travel times posted by the separate parties within the senior explorer’s overall team. As noted above, the Borup party spent 22 days on their southward journey to their expedition ship base location. The Peary party, who said they had traveled a southward distance that was more than three times the length of the distance traversed by the Borup party, said they had achieved their march in 19 days.

=== Museum curator ===
Upon his expedition ship’s triumphant return to New York City later in 1909, explorer Borup was paid off. He successfully applied to the American Museum of Natural History, in that city, for a position as a curatorial trainee. In this status he moved from geology to paleontology. He worked with the United States Geological Survey and carried out graduate studies at Yale University. Borup also wrote a memoir, A Tenderfoot With Peary (1911).

Borup continued his support of Peary and the senior explorer’s claim to have reached the Pole. This claim was directly opposed to a parallel and prior claim set down by rival explorer Frederick Cook. Cook, like Peary, claimed to have marched with an Inuit group in a trek across the Arctic Ocean icecap to the North Pole. Borup assisted Peary’s senior aide, Matthew Henson, in a reported interview of Cook’s Inuit companions, in which the Inuit explorers supposedly admitted that they had left Ellesmere Island, marched a few days north across the icecap, then turned south before ever getting close to the Pole.

As Peary’s polar claim moved towards popular United States acceptance, the senior explorer entered retirement. Still in his twenties, Borup sought further adventures. Peary had, among other assertions, laid claim to the discovery by the United States of what he called “Crocker Land,” a large Arctic land mass which he said he had seen in the Arctic mists north of Ellesmere Island. In 1911, Borup and his fellow explorer, Donald Baxter MacMillan, proposed and began to organize the Crocker Land Expedition to find and survey the unmapped island. Borup was to have been the leader of the expedition’s land party, which would have actually landed on and surveyed the mysterious island.

While training for what he expected to be strenuous duties in the Arctic, Borup’s life came to a premature end. While canoeing in Long Island Sound at Crescent Beach off the coast of Connecticut, he drowned on April 18, 1912. He was buried in the historic Dale Cemetery in Ossining.

After a year’s delay associated with this tragedy, the Crocker Land Expedition headed north under MacMillan in 1913, only to find that the “land” was a mirage.

== Legacy ==
The Crocker Land Expedition mapped and named a large Ellesmere Island bay, Borup Fjord, after the dead explorer. Subsequently, Borup Island, off far northern Greenland, was also named in his honor.

Yvette Borup Andrews accepted the Peary Polar Expedition Medal in silver on behalf of her brother in 1945.
