= Marvin Islands =

Island group in Nunavut, Canada

- Location within Nunavut Location within Canada

Geography
- Location: Arctic Ocean
- Coordinates: 82°59′N 73°37′W

Administration
- Canada
- Nunavut: Nunavut
- Region: Qikiqtaaluk

Demographics
- Population: Uninhabited

The uninhabited Marvin Islands are located in the Arctic Ocean across the mouth of Disraeli Fiord, in northern Ellesmere Island within the Quttinirpaaq National Park. Ward Hunt Island lies to the northwest. The island group is a part of the Qikiqtaaluk Region, Nunavut, Canada.

The islands are named after Ross Gilmore Marvin, a member of two Arctic expeditions led by Robert Peary.
