= Roy Chapman Andrews =

American explorer, naturalist, and writer (1884–1960)

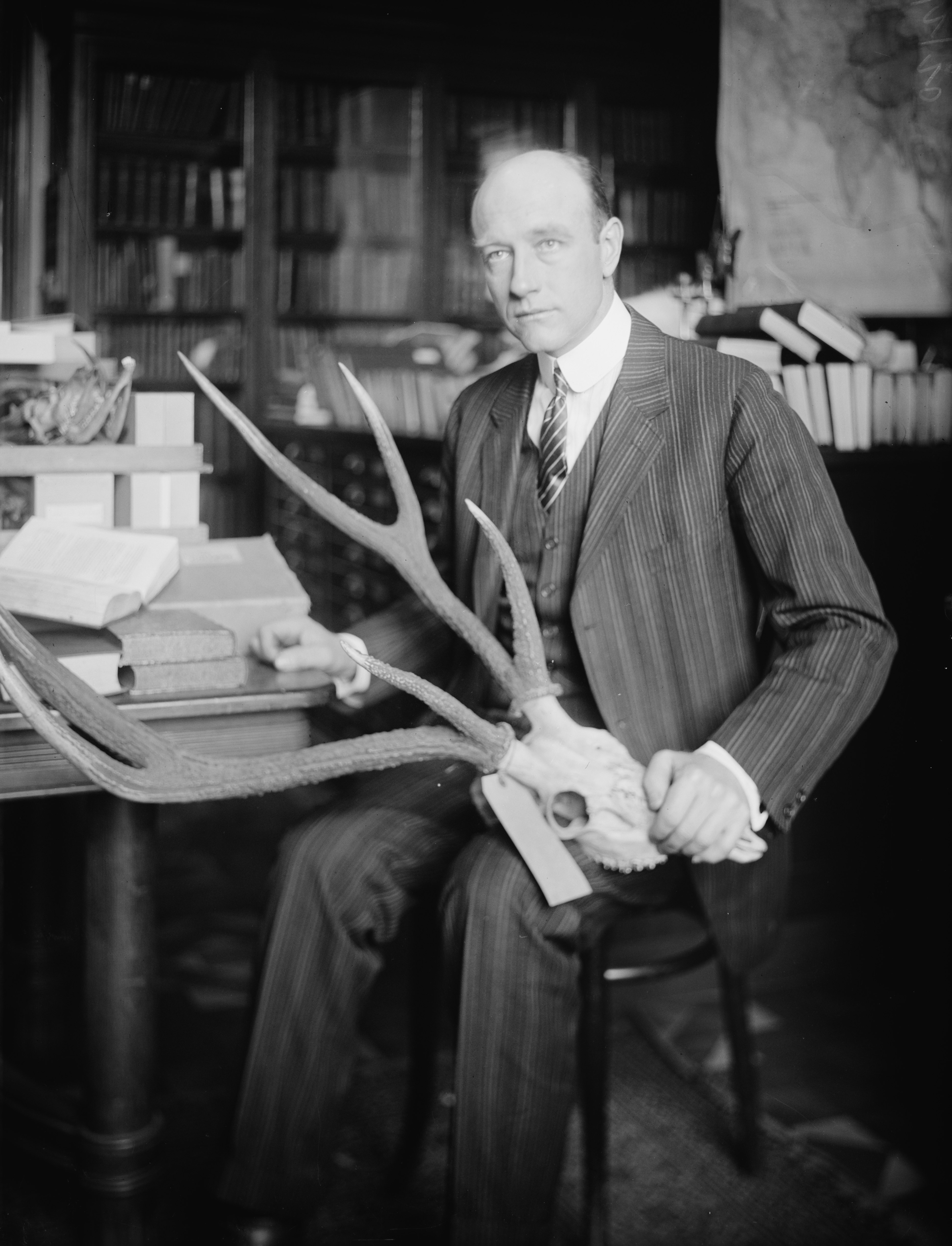
- Born: January 26, 1884; Beloit, Wisconsin, U.S.
- Died: March 11, 1960 (aged 76); Carmel-by-the-Sea, California, U.S.
- Resting place: Oakwood Cemetery, Beloit, Wisconsin, U.S.
- Education: Beloit College; Columbia University
- Occupations: Explorer, adventurer, naturalist
- Years active: 1909–1960
- Employer: American Museum of Natural History
- Known for: Paleontological field work
- Spouses: Yvette Borup, Wilhelmina Christmas
- Awards: Hubbard Medal (1931); Charles P. Daly Medal (1935); Vega Medal (1937); Cover of Time Magazine, October 29, 1923

Roy Chapman Andrews (January 26, 1884 – March 11, 1960) was an American explorer, adventurer, and naturalist who became the director of the American Museum of Natural History. He led a series of expeditions through the politically disturbed Mongolia of the early 20th century into the Gobi Desert and Mongolia. The expeditions made important discoveries and brought the first-known fossil dinosaur eggs to the museum. Chapman's popular writing about his adventures made him famous.

== Biography ==
=== Early life and education ===
Andrews was born on January 26, 1884, in Beloit, Wisconsin. As a child, he explored forests, fields, and waters nearby, developing marksmanship skills. He taught himself taxidermy and used funds from this hobby to pay tuition to Beloit College. After graduating, Andrews applied for work at the American Museum of Natural History in New York City. He so much wanted to work there that after being told that there were no openings at his level, Andrews accepted a job as a janitor in the taxidermy department and began collecting specimens for the museum. During the next few years, he worked and studied simultaneously, earning a Master of Arts degree in mammalogy from Columbia University. Andrews joined The Explorers Club in New York during 1908, four years after its founding.

=== Career ===
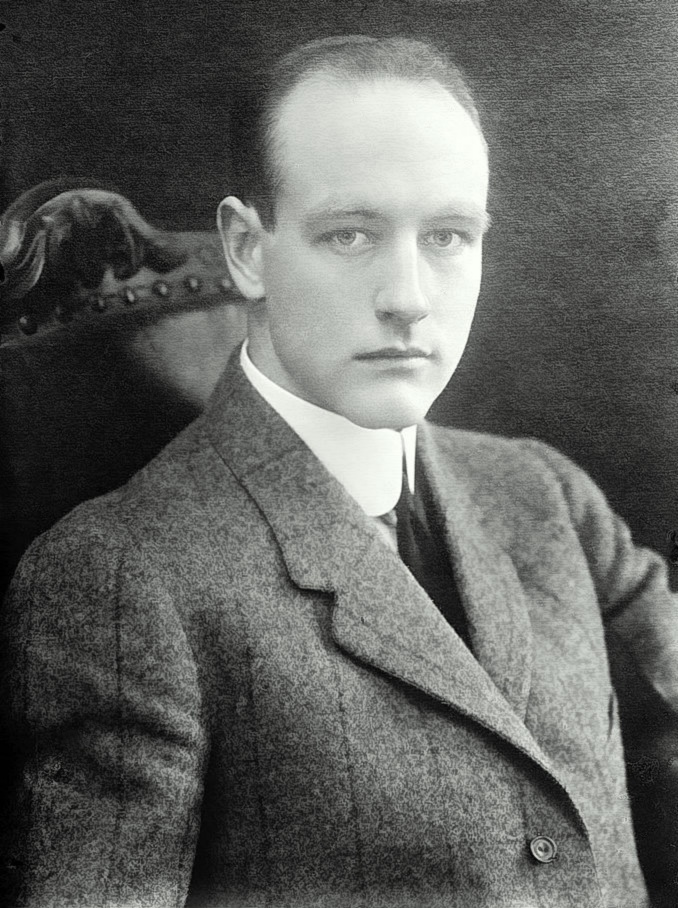
Roy Chapman Andrews, 1913

From 1909 to 1910, Andrews sailed on the USS Albatross to the East Indies, collecting snakes and lizards and observing marine mammals. In 1913, he sailed aboard the schooner Adventuress with owner John Borden to the Arctic. They were hoping to obtain a bowhead whale specimen for the American Museum of Natural History. On this expedition, he filmed some of the best footage of seals ever seen, though did not succeed in acquiring a whale specimen.

He married Yvette Borup in 1914. From 1916 to 1917, Andrews and his wife led the Asiatic Zoological Expedition of the museum through much of western and southern Yunnan, as well as other provinces of China. The book Camps and Trails in China records their experiences.

In 1920, Andrews began planning for expeditions to Mongolia and drove a fleet of Dodge cars westward from Peking. In 1922, the party discovered a fossil of Paraceratherium (then named "Baluchitherium"), a gigantic hornless rhinocerotoid, which was sent back to the museum, arriving on December 19. The fossil species Andrewsarchus was named after him.

Andrews, along with Henry Fairfield Osborn, was a proponent of the Out of Asia theory of humanity's origins and led several expeditions to Asia from 1922 to 1928 known as the "Central Asiatic Expeditions" to search for the earliest human remains in Asia. The expeditions did not find human remains. However, Andrews and his team made many other finds, including dinosaur bones and fossil mammals and the first nests full of dinosaur eggs ever discovered. He had an accidental injury to his foot when his collecting pistol went off. Andrews' account of these expeditions can be found in his book The New Conquest of Central Asia.

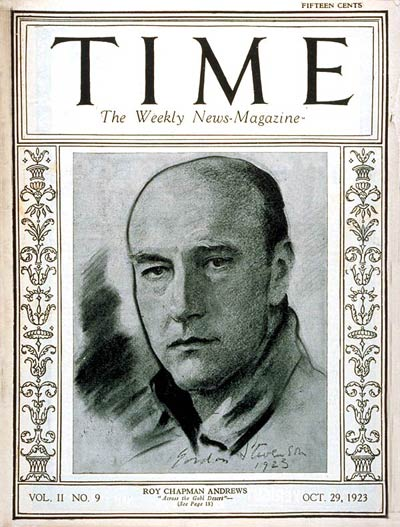
Time cover, 29 October 1923

In his preface to Andrews's 1926 book, On the Trail of the Ancient Man, Henry Fairfield Osborn predicted that the birthplace of modern humans would be found in Asia and stated that he had predicted this decades earlier, even before the Asiatic expeditions.

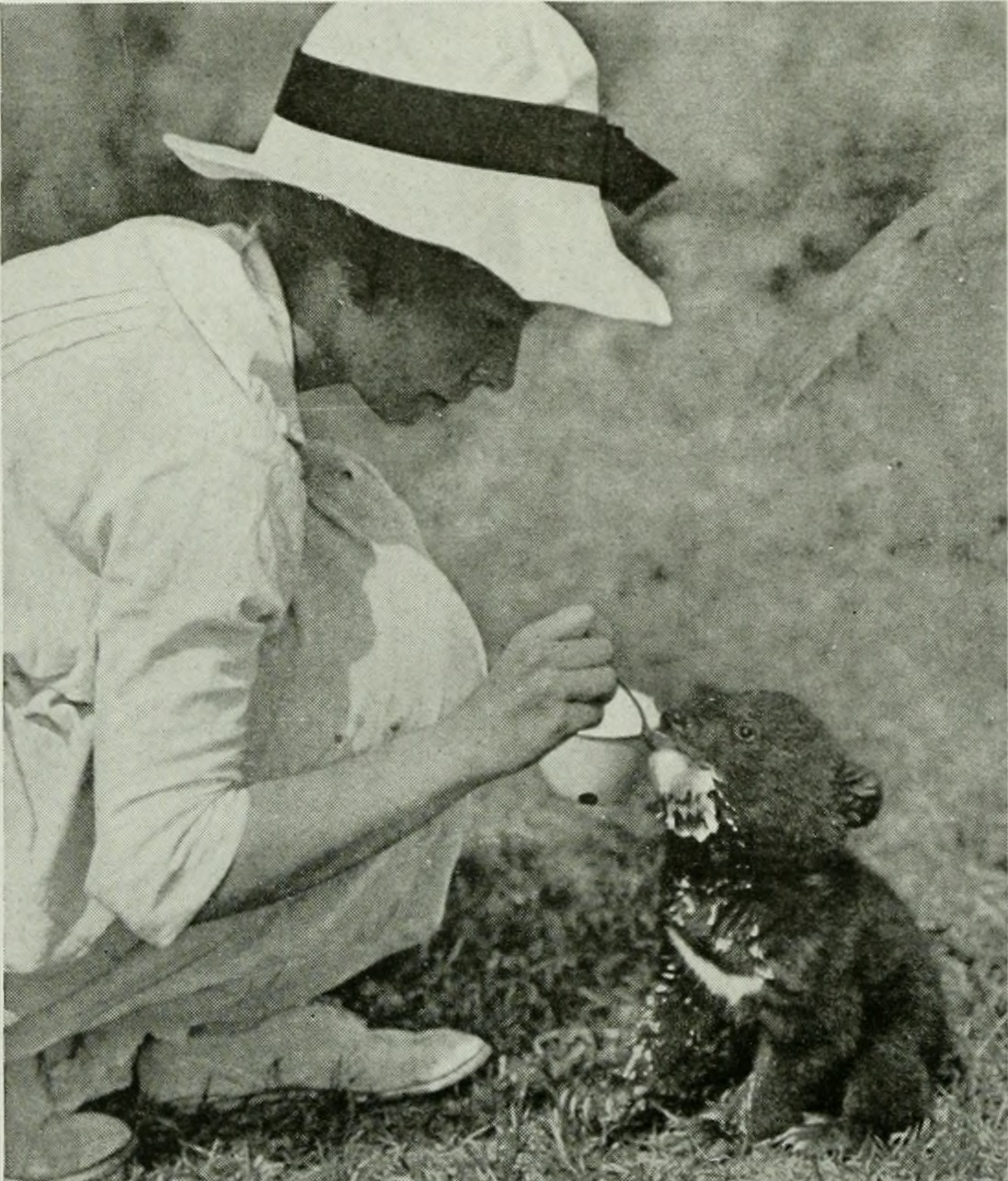
Mrs. Yvette Borup Andrews, first wife of Roy Chapman Andrews, feeding Tibetan Bear cub in 1917

On July 13, 1923, the party was the first in the world to discover dinosaur eggs. Initially thought to be eggs of a ceratopsian, Protoceratops, they were determined in 1995 actually to belong to the theropod Oviraptor. During that same expedition, Walter W. Granger discovered a skull from the Cretaceous period. In 1925, the museum sent a letter back informing the party that the skull was that of a mammal, and therefore even more rare and valuable; more were uncovered. Expeditions in the area stopped during 1926 and 1927. In 1928, the expedition's finds were seized by Chinese authorities but were eventually returned. The 1929 expedition was cancelled. In 1930, Andrews made one final trip and discovered some mastodon fossils. A cinematographer, James B. Shackelford, made filmed records of many of Andrews' expeditions. (Sixty years after Andrews' initial expedition, the American Museum of Natural History sent a new expedition to Mongolia on the invitation of its government to continue exploration.) Later that year, Andrews returned to the United States and divorced his wife, with whom he had two sons. He married his second wife, Wilhelmina Christmas, in 1935.

In 1927, the Boy Scouts of America made Andrews an Honorary Scout, a new category of Scout created that year. This distinction was given to "American citizens whose achievements in outdoor activity, exploration and worthwhile adventure are of such an exceptional character as to capture the imagination of boys...". That same year, Andrews was elected to the American Philosophical Society.

Andrews was President of The Explorers Club from 1931 to 1934. In 1934, he became the director of the Natural History museum. In his 1935 book The Business of Exploring, he wrote "I was born to be an explorer...There was never any decision to make. I couldn't do anything else and be happy." In 1942, Andrews retired to North Colebrook, Connecticut. He and Wilhelmina lived on a country estate of 160 acres, "PondOWoods". He wrote most of his autobiographical books of life and adventures here. Around 1958, Andrews moved to Carmel Valley, California. He died on March 11, 1960, of heart failure at Peninsula Community Hospital in Carmel, California. He is buried in Oakwood Cemetery in his hometown of Beloit.

== Association with character "Indiana Jones" ==
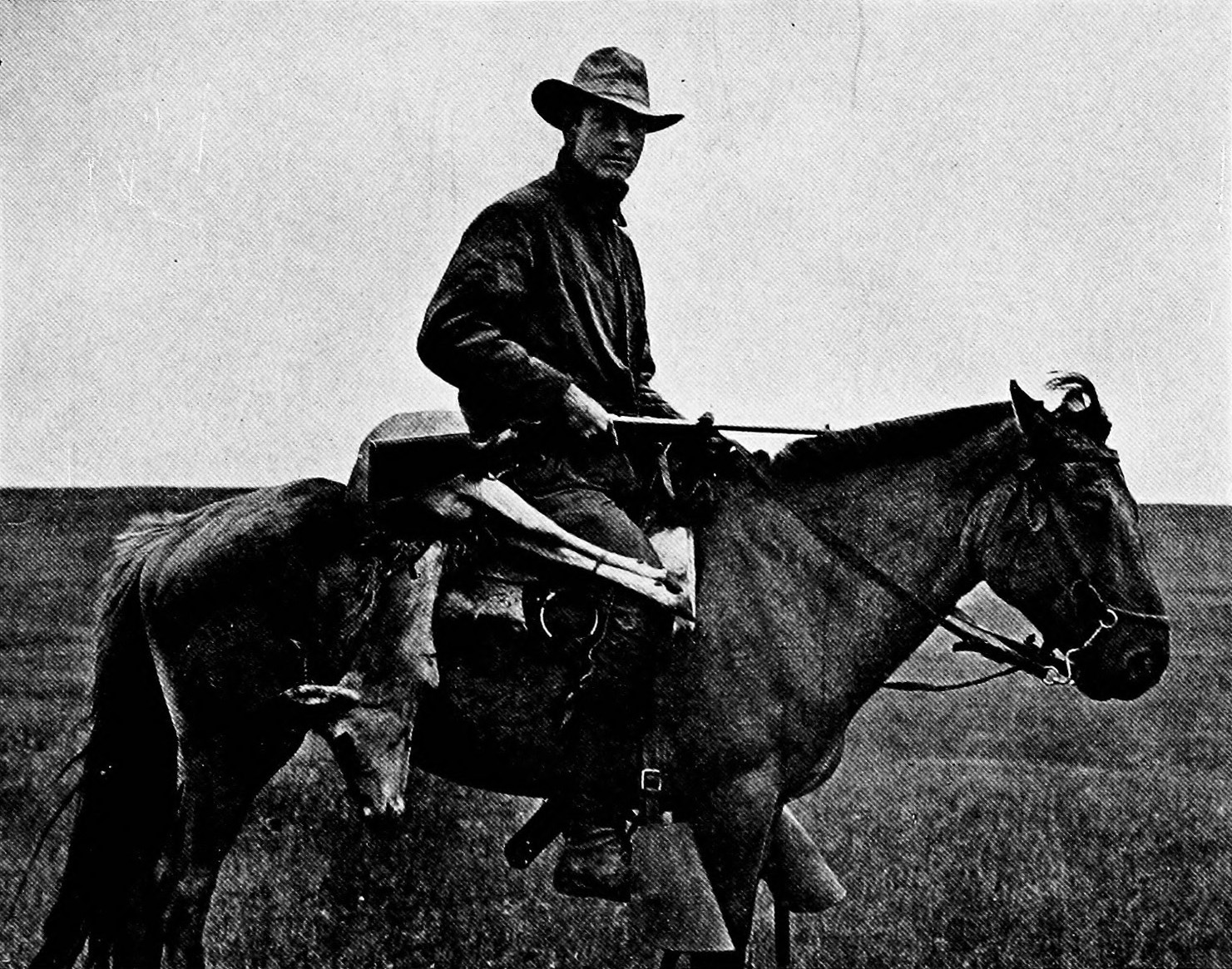
Roy Chapman Andrews on his horse Kublai Khan in Mongolia about 1920

Douglas Preston of the American Museum of Natural History wrote: "Andrews is allegedly the person that the movie character of Indiana Jones was patterned after. However, neither George Lucas nor the other creators of the films have confirmed this. Other candidates have been suggested, including Colonel Percy Fawcett. The 120-page transcript of the story conferences for the movie does not mention Andrews."

An analysis by the Smithsonian Channel concludes that the linkage was indirect, with Andrews (and other explorers) serving as the model for heroes in adventure films of the 1940s and 1950s, who in turn inspired Lucas and his fellow writers.

== Bibliography ==
1921 cover of Across Mongolian Plains: A Naturalist's Account of China's Great Northwest by Andrews

Books listed on Worldcat:

- Monographs of the Pacific Cetacea (1914–16)
- Whale Hunting With Gun and Camera (1916)
- Camps and Trails in China (1918)
- Across Mongolian Plains (1921)
- On The Trail of Ancient Man (1926)
- Ends of the Earth (1929)
- The New Conquest of Central Asia (1932)
- This Business of Exploring (1935)
- Exploring with Andrews (1938)
- This Amazing Planet (1939)
- Under a Lucky Star (1943)
- Meet your Ancestors, A Biography of Primitive Man (1945)
- An Explorer Comes Home (1947)
- My Favorite Stories of the Great Outdoors (1950)
- Quest in the Desert (1950)
- Heart of Asia: True Tales of the Far East (1951)
- Nature's Way: How Nature Takes Care of Her Own (1951)
- All About Dinosaurs (1953)
- All About Whales (1954)
- Beyond Adventure: The Lives of Three Explorers (1954)
- Quest of the Snow Leopard (1955)
- All About Strange Beasts of the Past (1956)
- In the Days of the Dinosaurs (1959)

Awards and achievements
Preceded by John W. Weeks	Cover of Time Magazine; October 29, 1923	Succeeded by Giulio Gatti-Casazza
