= George A. Brandreth =

American politician

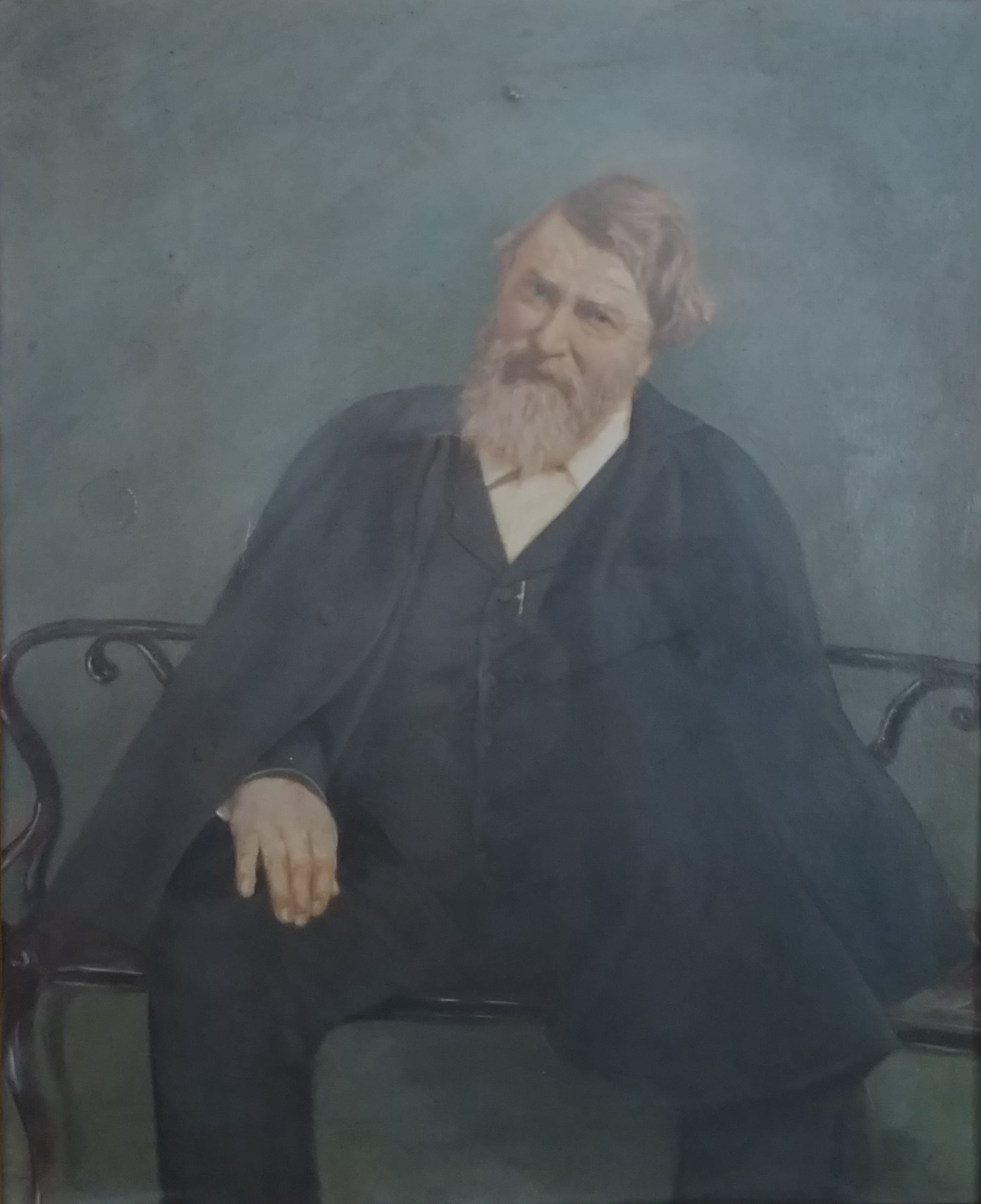
George A. Brandreth Portrait (Oil on Canvas)

George Adlington Brandreth (October 16, 1828 – November 15, 1897) was an American lawyer, manufacturer and politician from New York.

== Life ==
He was born in Leeds, England, to Benjamin Brandreth and Harriet (Smallpage) Brandreth. After the death of his second wife, Benjamin Brandreth emigrated in 1835 to the United States with his small children and settled in New York City where he manufactured his panacea "Brandreth's Pills." Due to the enormous increase in production, he moved in 1838 to Sing Sing (now Ossining), and established there the Brandreth Pill Factory.

George Brandreth studied law, was admitted to the bar, and practiced in Sing Sing. He married Virginia Gadsby Ward (d. 1872, a daughter of Congressman Aaron Ward), and they had four daughters: Eliza V. "Lily" (Brandreth) Larkin, Helen Ward (Brandreth) Potter (d. 1905), Fanny R. (Brandreth) Kane and Mary Watson (Brandreth) Borup.

On April 26, 1854, he was re-appointed Consul at Plymouth, England.

Originally a Democrat, he joined the War Democrats during the American Civil War, and became a Republican after the war. He was a member of the New York State Assembly (Westchester Co., 3rd D.) in 1864, 1865 and 1866. In May 1864, he was elected Chairman of the War Democratic State Committee.

After the death of his father in 1880, he took over the management of the pills factory. In 1884, he married Annie Ashton.

In 1892, he ran for Congress in the 16th District but was defeated by Democrat William Ryan.

He died of "fatty degeneration of the heart" on November 15, 1897, in Sing Sing.

George A. Brandreth's granddaughter Yvette Borup Andrews (1891-1959) was a photographer and filmmaker for several American Museum of Natural History expeditions to Central Asia. His grandson George Borup was a polar explorer and paleontologist.

== Sources ==
- Congressional Directory for 1852 (page 40)
- LATEST INTELLIGENCE in NYT on April 27, 1854
- "Meeting of the State Committee of War Democrats". The New York Times. May 26, 1864.
- Death notice of his wife Virginia, in NYT on March 6, 1872
- MAARIAGES IN SEPTEMBER; LARKIN - BRANDRETH... in NYT on September 26, 1883 (his daughter Lily V. Brandreth's marriage)
- NEW YORK'S OFFICIAL VOTE in NYT on November 29, 1892
- BRANDRETH'S WILL FILED in NYT on December 7, 1897
- New York Civil List (1865; pages 473 and 475)

New York State Assembly
Preceded by Chauncey M. Depew	New York State Assembly; Westchester County, 3rd District; 1864–1866	Succeeded by David W. Travis
