= Cape Columbia =

Cape in Nunavaut, Canada

Coordinates: 83°06′41″N 069°57′13″W

- Cape
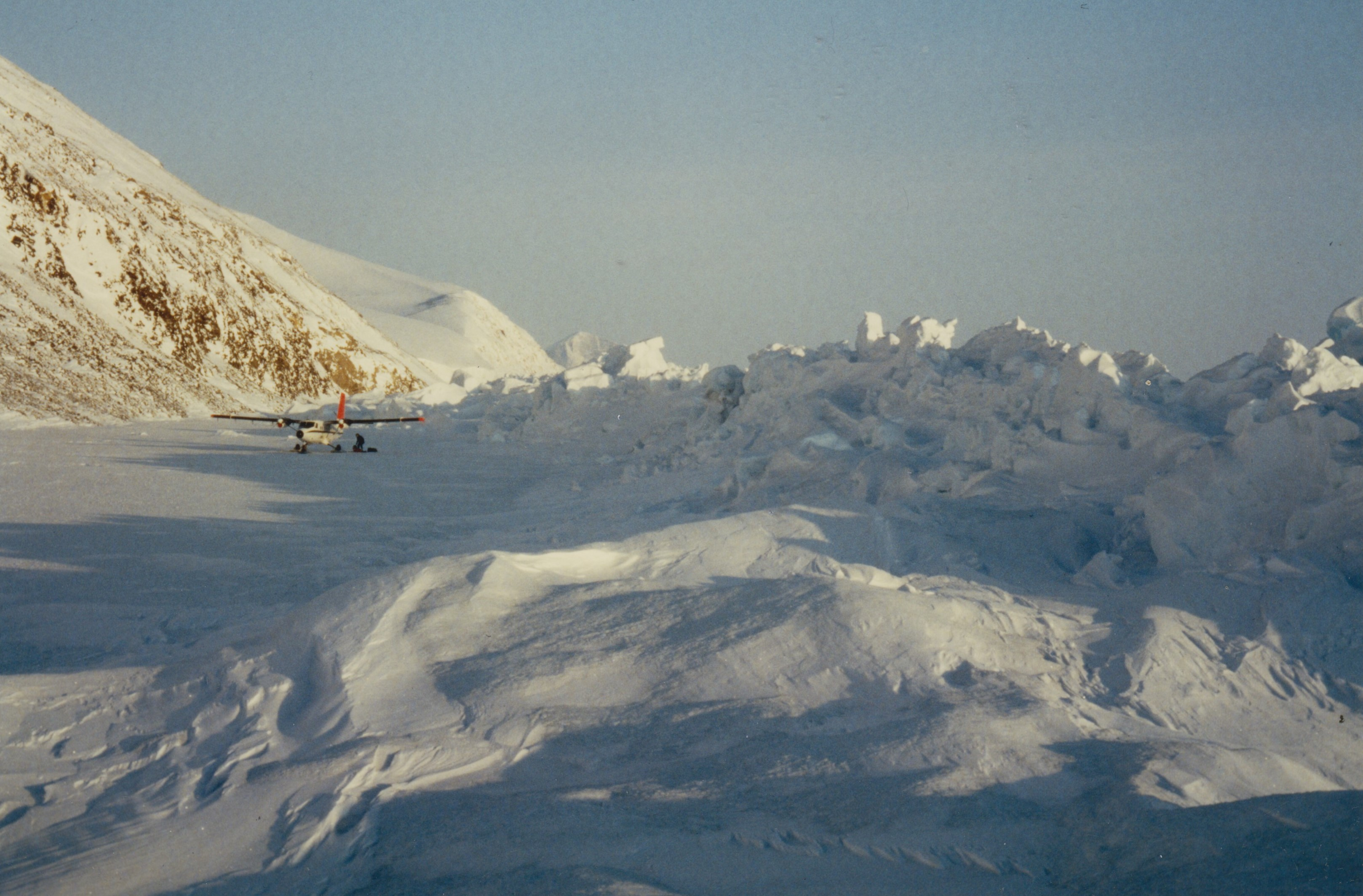
- The pack ice of the Arctic Ocean stagnates off Cape Columbia, April 18, 1990

- Location within Nunavut
- Coordinates
- Location: Ellesmere Island, Nunavut, Canada
- Water bodies: Lincoln Sea, Arctic Ocean
- Topo map: NTS 120G3 Parr Bay

Cape Columbia is the northernmost point of land of Canada, located on Ellesmere Island in the Qikiqtaaluk Region of Nunavut. It marks the westernmost coastal point of Lincoln Sea in the Arctic Ocean. It is the world's northernmost point of land outside Greenland. The distance to the North Pole is 769 kilometres (478 mi).

As the northernmost point of Canada, Cape Columbia is exposed to the ice drift of the Arctic sea ice. The approximately 2-metre (6 ft 7 in) thick pack ice of the Arctic Ocean moves several hundred metres per day from east to west. As a result, mighty ice pressure ridges can be piled up at Cape Columbia.

== History ==
In 1876, Pelham Aldrich was the first European to reach Cape Columbia. He was a lieutenant with the British Arctic Expedition (1875–76) of explorer George Nares.

== Gallery ==
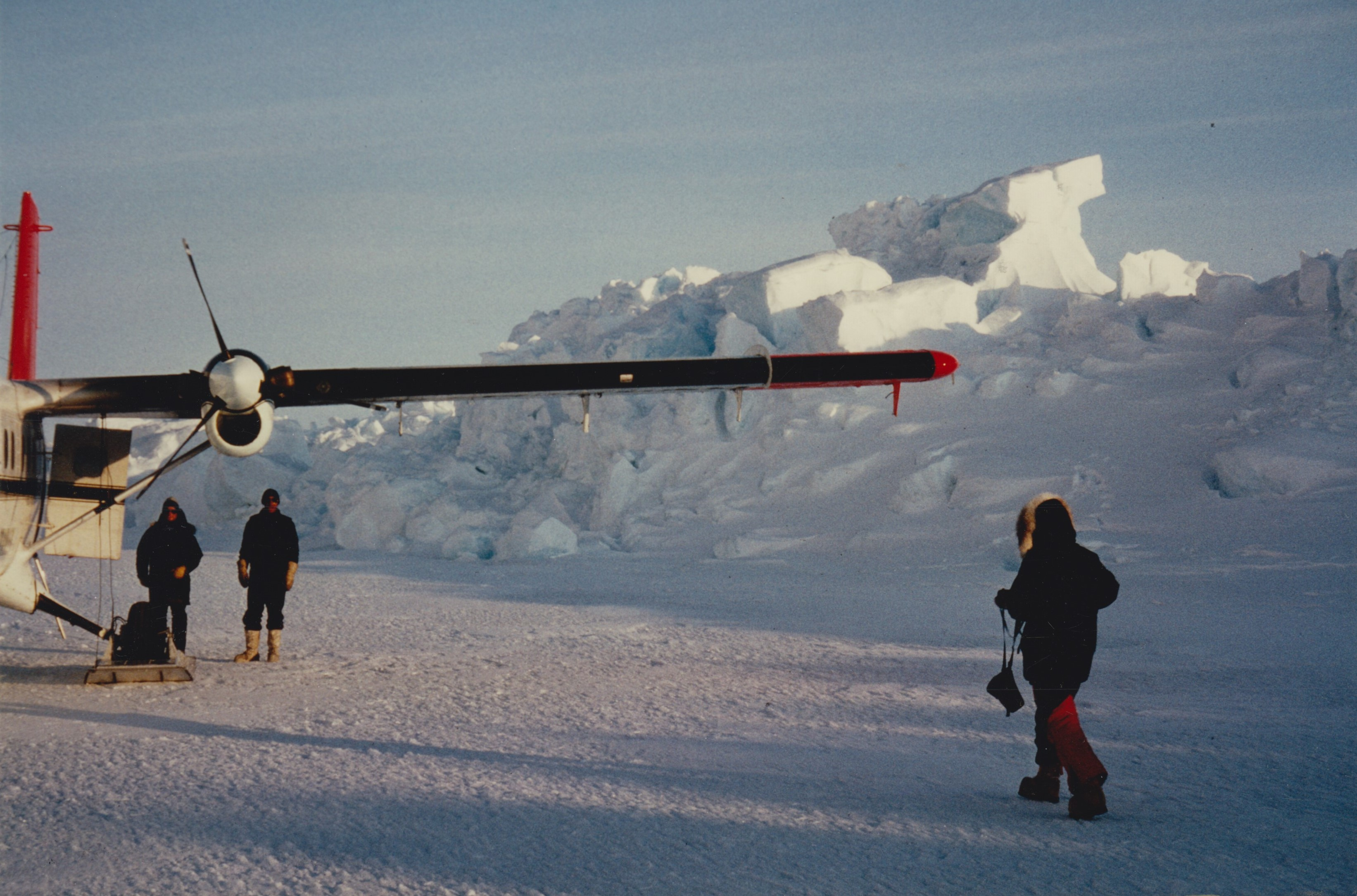
Pack ice of the Arctic Ocean accumulates off Cape Columbia. The Twin Otter airplane stands on the fast ice between the stacked pack ice (right) and the mainland

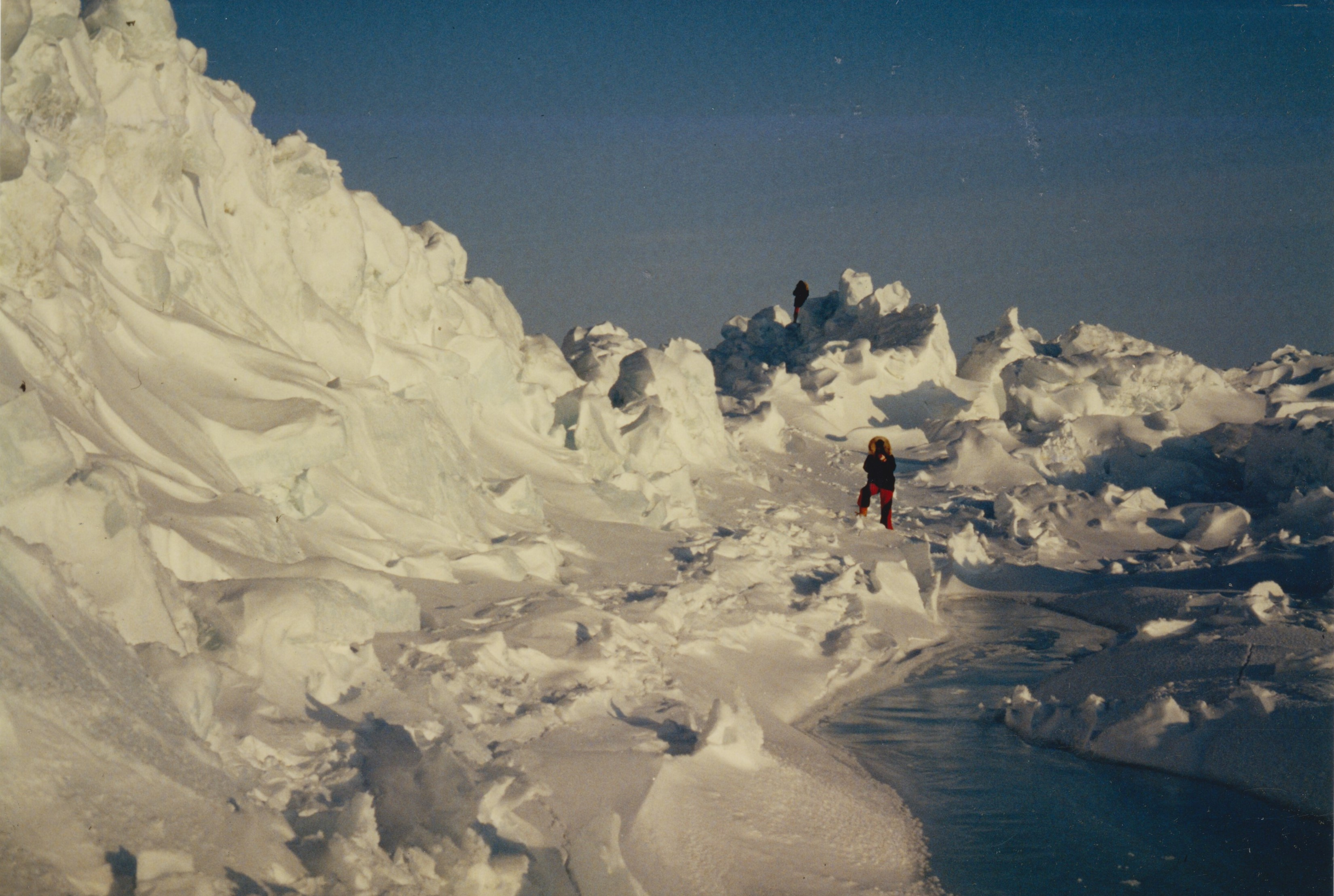
Ice pressure ridges of the Arctic Ocean off Cape Columbia

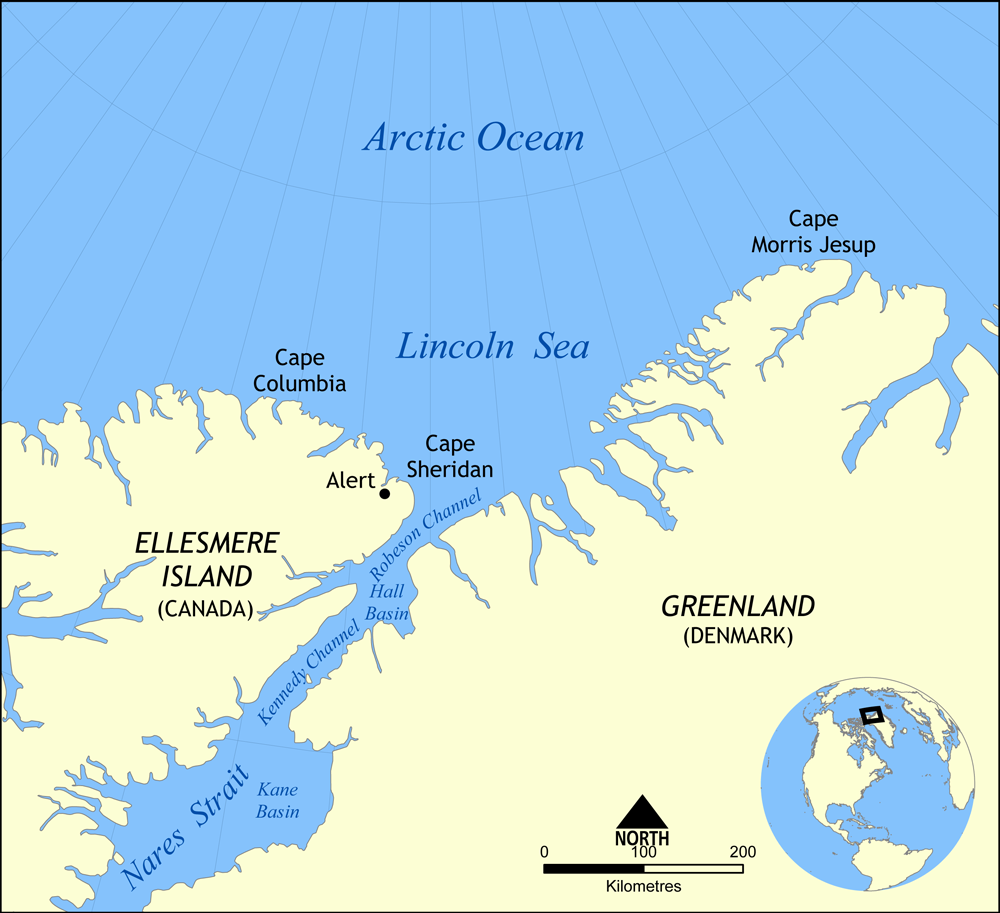
Map of Cape Columbia and the Lincoln Sea

=== Peary ===
Robert Peary chose the Cape as the location for the northernmost depot of his final attempt to reach the North Pole (1909), not only for its proximity but because it is located far enough west to be out of the ice current setting down Robeson Channel. From Cape Columbia his party planned to strike straight north over the ice of the Arctic Ocean. His winter camp and ship the SS Roosevelt were situated some 140 kilometres (90 mi) southeast, at Cape Sheridan near Alert.

Peary's sledge divisions left the Roosevelt from February 15 to 22, 1909, rendezvoused at Cape Columbia, and on March 1 the expedition left Cape Columbia, heading across the Arctic Ocean for the Pole. The 84th parallel was crossed on March 18, the 86th on March 23. Peary returned to land at Cape Columbia again on April 23. Peary's claim to have reached the North Pole has long been subject to doubt. While some polar historians believe that Peary honestly thought he had reached the pole, others have suggested that he was guilty of deliberately exaggerating his accomplishments.
