= Marie Ahnighito Peary =

American writer and philanthropist (1893–1978)

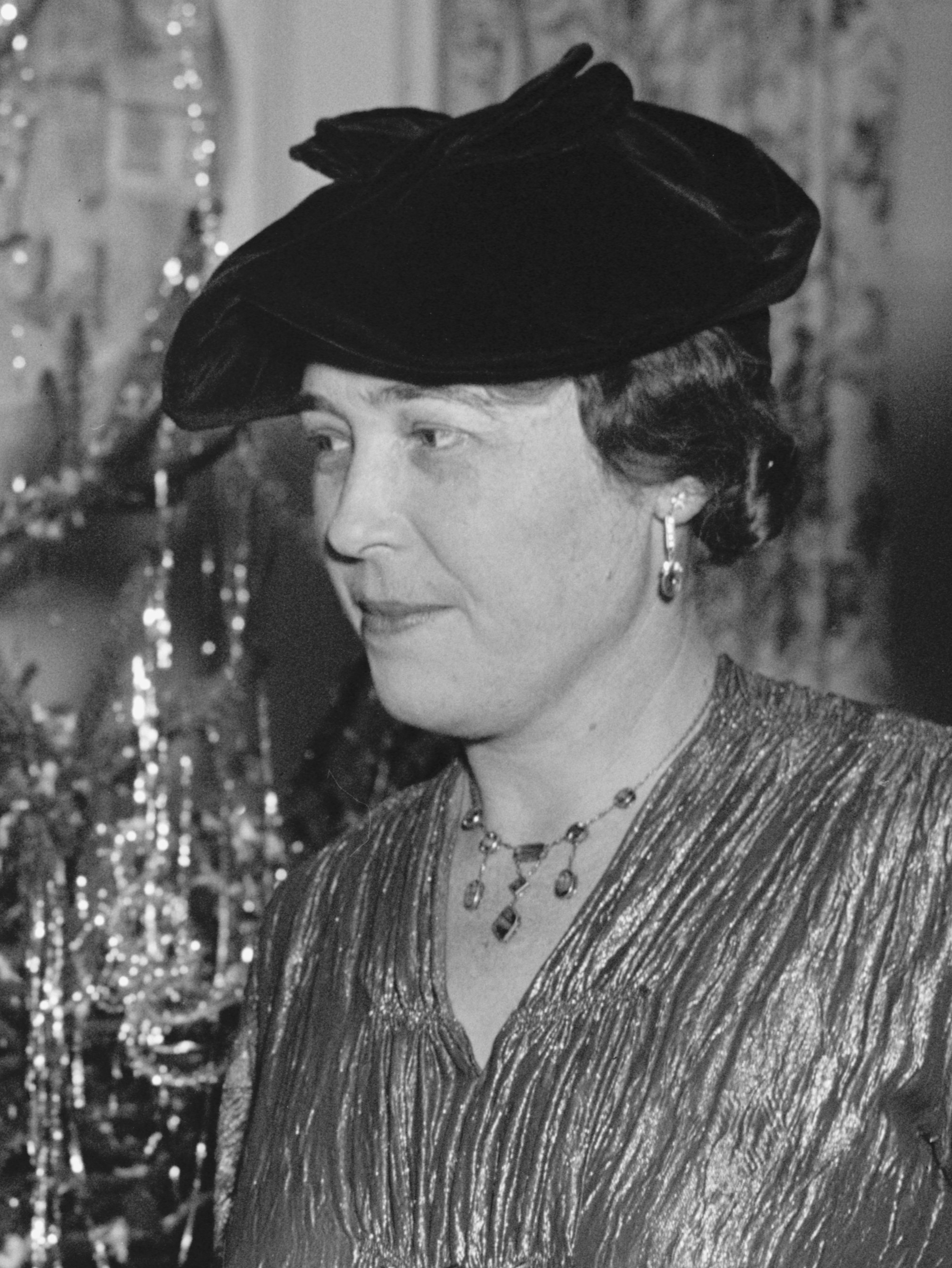
- Born: September 12, 1893; Bowdoin Fjord, Greenland
- Died: April 16, 1978 (aged 84); Brunswick, Maine, US
- Burial place: Arlington National Cemetery
- Other name: Marie Ahnighito Peary Stafford
- Occupations: Writer, philanthropist

Marie Ahnighito Peary (September 12, 1893 – April 16, 1978) was an American writer and philanthropist. As the daughter of famous polar explorers Robert Peary and Josephine Peary, she spent much of her life championing her parental legacy.

== Early life ==
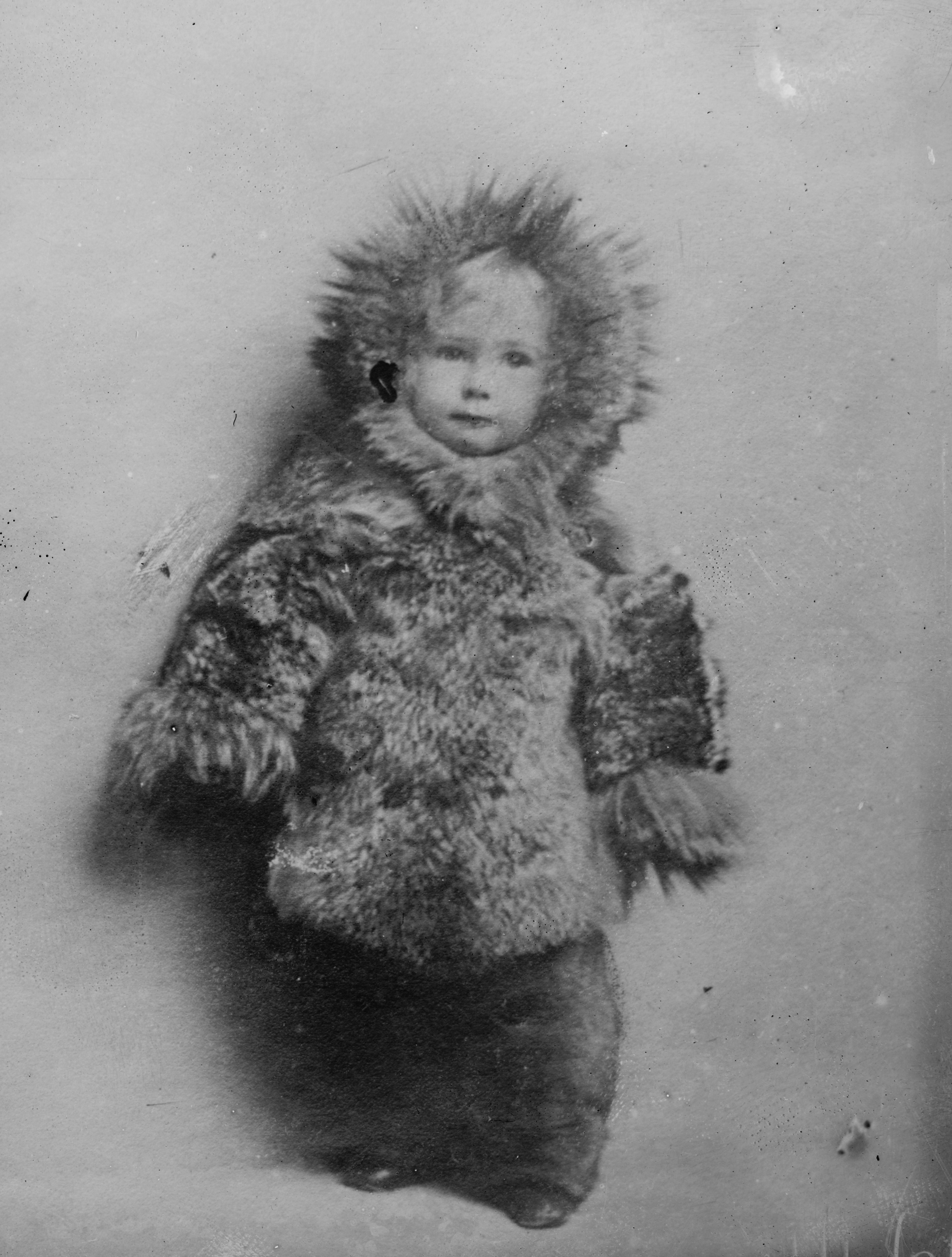
Marie Peary as a toddler

Peary was born on September 12, 1893, to Arctic explorers Josephine Diebitsch Peary and Robert Peary. She was born at the Peary expedition's base camp on the shores of Bowdoin Fjord in Kalaallit Nunaat (Greenland). Her middle name, Ahnighito (properly spelled Arnakittoq), honors the Inuk woman who crafted the infant’s fur clothes. Peary was nicknamed “Snow Baby,” an epithet supposedly given to her by the Inuit. She spent most of her childhood in various Arctic camps, Washington, D.C., and Eagle Island in Maine. She attended Georgetown Visitation Preparatory School and public high school in Washington, D.C., before studying French and German in the Swiss city of Geneva for a year, completing secretarial school, and serving as secretary for her father.

== Career ==
Peary's adventurous Arctic childhood provided fodder for her writing. She published five books for children: Little Tooktoo: The Story of Santa Claus’ Youngest Reindeer (1930), Muskox: Little Tooktoo’s Friend (1931), The Red Caboose: With Peary in the Arctic (1932), Snow Baby (1935, an autobiography for children), and Ootah and His Puppy (1942). For adults, she published The Snowbaby’s Own Story (1934, her memoirs) and Discoverer of The North Pole: The Story of Robert E. Peary (1959). Throughout her life, she championed her father's legacy, convinced that he was the first white explorer to reach the North Pole. She was instrumental in raising monuments to her father's memory at Arlington National Cemetery, Cape York in Greenland, and Jockey Cap Mountain in Fryeburg, Maine.

Peary received King Christian X’s Liberty Medal for serving on the Danish-American commission that helped manage the affairs of Greenland during World War II. She served as president of the Society of Woman Geographers, in which she stayed active for 50 years. She received an honorary Master of Arts degree from Bowdoin College (her father's alma mater) in 1949 and the Henry G. Bryant Medal from the Geographical Society of Philadelphia in 1954. She gifted her father's papers to the National Archives. She and her brother donated the Pearys' private island, Eagle Island in Casco Bay, to the State of Maine in 1967.

== Personal life ==
In 1917, Peary married Edward Stafford (1889–1955), a Washington-based lawyer. He served as a captain in the United States Army Coast Artillery Corps during World War I. The couple had two sons, Edward Peary Stafford (1918–2013) and Peary Diebitsch Stafford (1920–1946). Her first husband died in 1955, and in 1967 she married retired sea captain and longtime friend William Walter Kuhne (1888–1977). She had one full sibling, Robert Peary Jr. (1903–1994), an engineer.

Peary resided in Brunswick, Maine, from 1955 until her death on April 16, 1978, at the age of 84. She was buried alongside her first husband at Arlington National Cemetery.
