= Flagler Bay =

Bay in Nunavut, Canada

- Location within Nunavut
- Location: Nares Strait
- Coordinates: 79°10′N 77°00′W
- Ocean/sea sources: Arctic Ocean
- Basin countries: Canada
- Settlements: Uninhabited

Flagler Bay is an Arctic waterway in the Qikiqtaaluk Region, Nunavut, Canada. It is located in Nares Strait by eastern Ellesmere Island between Bache Peninsula and Knud Peninsula.

== Geography ==
The Sverdrup Pass, a 68 km (42 mi) long travel route across the island, extends from Flagler Bay to Irene Bay.
