= Knud Peninsula =

Peninsula in Nunavut, Canada

Coordinates: 79°06′N 078°00′W

The Knud Peninsula is located on the eastern coast of Ellesmere Island, a part of the Qikiqtaaluk Region of the Canadian territory of Nunavut. It stretches eastward into Nares Strait. It is separated from the Bache Peninsula by Flagler Bay.

Archaeologists have found Thule culture houses on Knud Peninsula.
