= Henry Grier Bryant =

American explorer and writer

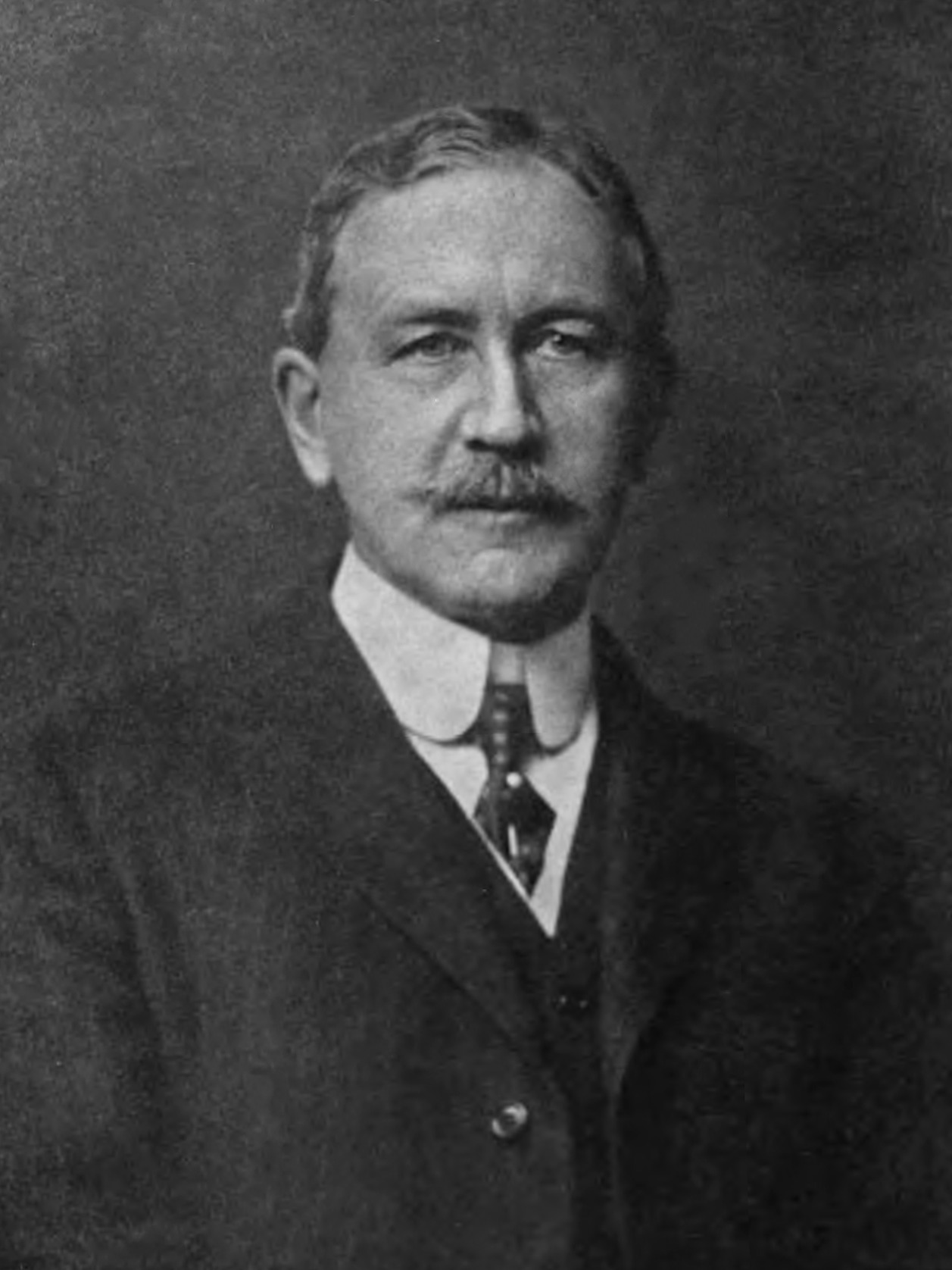
Henry Grier Bryant

Henry Grier Bryant (November 7, 1859 – December 7, 1932) was an American explorer and writer from Philadelphia, Pennsylvania.

== Education and early career ==
Henry Grier Bryant was born in Allegheny, Pennsylvania in 1859, the son of Walter Bryant, a successful lumber baron, and Eleanor Adams Henderson Bryant. The family moved to Philadelphia in 1866, where Bryant was educated in private schools. He attended Phillips Exeter Academy in New Hampshire from 1876 to 1879, then went to Princeton University, where he graduated in 1883. He earned a master's degree from the same school in 1886. That same year, he earned an LL.B. from the University of Pennsylvania. Bryant worked for several years for the Edison Electric Light Company, but spent much of his free time travelling in the western United States. He never married. His sister, Josephine, married P. Frederick Rothermel, who was later district attorney of Philadelphia.

== Exploration ==
=== Grand Falls ===
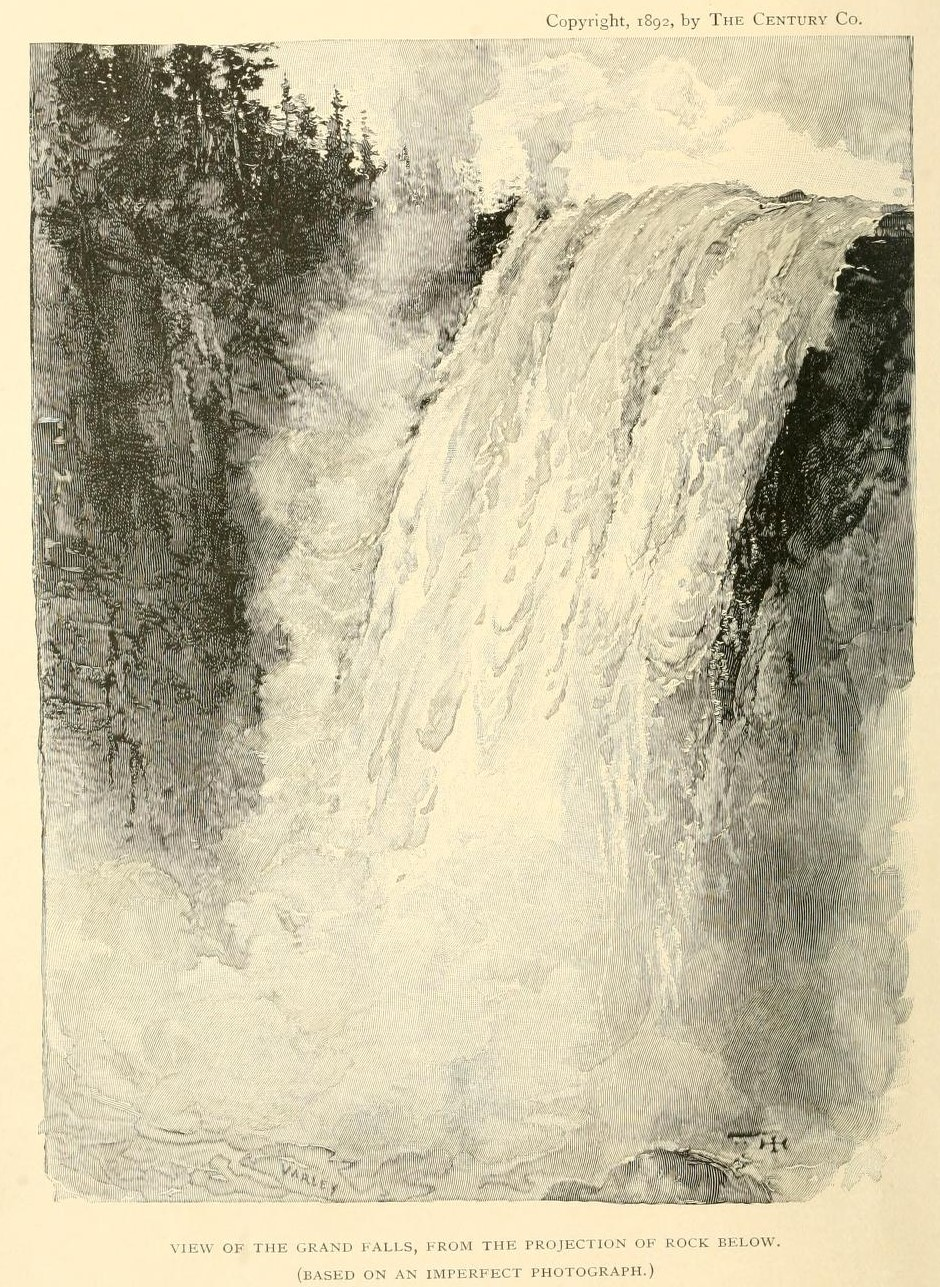
Bryant explored Grand Falls, Labrador (now Churchill Falls) in 1891.

In 1891, Bryant became a member of the Geographical Society of Philadelphia. That same year, he organized an expedition to Grand Falls in Labrador, then a part of the Newfoundland Colony (now known as Churchill Falls in Newfoundland and Labrador, Canada.) Although fur-trader John McLean had been the first westerner to see the Falls in 1841, none were known to have returned since then. The local Innu people had a taboo against visiting it. Bryant had been fascinated with the Grand Falls for several years: "There was something in the idea of this distant cataract—thundering on for ages in that far-off land—which appealed forcibly to one's imagination". Travelling up the Grand River (now the Churchill River), Bryant's group encountered First Nations tribes that had very little contact with white society. After an arduous journey, they reached the Falls on September 2, 1891. To that point, most knowledge of the Falls consisted of vague accounts by natives and McLean's journey of decades earlier; Bryant's detailed account of his trek was published in The Century Magazine in 1892, and attracted widespread attention. The Geographical Society of Philadelphia reprinted it in a book later that year.

=== Mountaineering ===
As Bryant was exploring the Grand Falls, another explorer, Robert Peary, was travelling in Greenland. After Peary and his crew had not returned as expected, the Philadelphia Academy of Natural Sciences organized a relief expedition led by Angelo Heilprin, with Bryant as second-in-command. In 1894, Peary led a second attempt to explore the northern reaches of Greenland. Bryant served on the auxiliary crew, which traveled north from St. John's, Newfoundland, to bring the main party home, which they successfully accomplished. His account of the trip was published in 1895.

Bryant continued to explore the far north in 1897, when he organized and led and expedition to the area around Mount Saint Elias on the Alaska-Yukon border. He was elected to the American Philosophical Society in 1898. In 1899, he helped to finance George W. Melville's study of oceanic currents in the polar regions. Bryant ventured south in 1904, visiting Popocatépetl, a Mexican volcano, but returned to the north in 1907, when he crossed the Malaspina Glacier, but was unsuccessful in summiting Mount Saint Elias. His mountaineering later took him to other peaks across the globe, including Mount Nantai in Japan, Pidurutalagala in Ceylon (now Sri Lanka), and Mauna Loa in Hawaii. He returned to Labrador in 1912 to explore the area around the Saint-Augustin River. The following year, he was elected president of the Association of American Geographers.

== Death ==
Bryant died in his home on December 7, 1932, after a brief illness. He was buried in Woodlands Cemetery in Philadelphia. The Philadelphia Geographical Society later established a gold medal in his honor, which has been awarded to John Oliver La Gorce in 1948 and Rachel Carson in 1952, among others.

== Sources ==
- "P.F. Rothermel, Noted Lawyer, Dead". The New York Times. May 26, 1929. p. 27.
- "H. G. Bryant is Dead; Peary Arctic Aide". The New York Times. December 8, 1932. p. 26.
- Bryant, Henry Grier (1892). A Journey to the Grand Falls of Labrador. Philadelphia, Pennsylvania: Geographical Society of Philadelphia. OCLC 8302962.
- Bryant, Henry Grier (1895). The Peary Auxiliary Expedition of 1894 (PDF). Philadelphia, Pennsylvania: Geographical Society of Philadelphia. OCLC 8302968.
- Bryant, Henry Grier (January 1913). "An Exploration in Southeastern Labrador". The Bulletin of the Geographical Society of Philadelphia. 11 (1): 1–15.
- Jordan, John W. (1921). Encyclopedia of Pennsylvania Biography. Vol. 13. New York, New York: Lewis Historical Publishing Company. OCLC 615509.
- Marsh, James (2006). "Churchill Falls". The Canadian Encyclopedia.
- Oberholtzer, Ellis Paxson (1912). Philadelphia: a History of the City and its People. Vol. IV. Philadelphia, Pennsylvania: S.J. Clarke Publishing Company. OCLC 1625418.
- Henry Grier Bryant Correspondence Books at Dartmouth College Library
- Williams, Frank E. (December 1933). "Henry Grier Bryant". Annals of the Association of American Geographers. 23 (4): 247–250. doi:10.1080/00045603309357076. JSTOR 2560611.
