= Diebitsch =

Diebitsch is a surname. Notable people with the surname include:

- Hans Karl von Diebitsch (1785–1831), German serving as Russian field marshal
- Karl Diebitsch (1899–1985), German artist and soldier responsible for much of the Third Reich SS regalia
- Josephine Cecilia Diebitsch (1863–1955), American arctic explorer with her husband Robert Peary
