= Bartlett Bay =

Bay in Nunavut, Canada

- Location within Nunavut
- Location: Nares Strait
- Coordinates: 79°10′N 074°45′W
- Ocean/sea sources: Arctic Ocean
- Basin countries: Canada
- Settlements: Uninhabited

Bartlett Bay is an Arctic waterway in the Qikiqtaaluk Region, Nunavut, Canada. It is in Nares Strait off eastern Ellesmere Island, off the Bache Peninsula. Victoria Head marks the northern tip of its mouth.

It is named in honour of Captain Robert Bartlett, a Newfoundland navigator and Arctic explorer.

== Geography ==
The Bartlett Bay Lowland, encompassing an area of approximately 50 km^{2} (19 sq mi), is composed of mesic habitat and wet meadows.

== Fauna ==
Muskox frequent the area.
