= Eagle Island (Casco Bay, Maine) =

Historic house in Maine, United States

- U.S. National Register of Historic Places
- U.S. National Historic Landmark
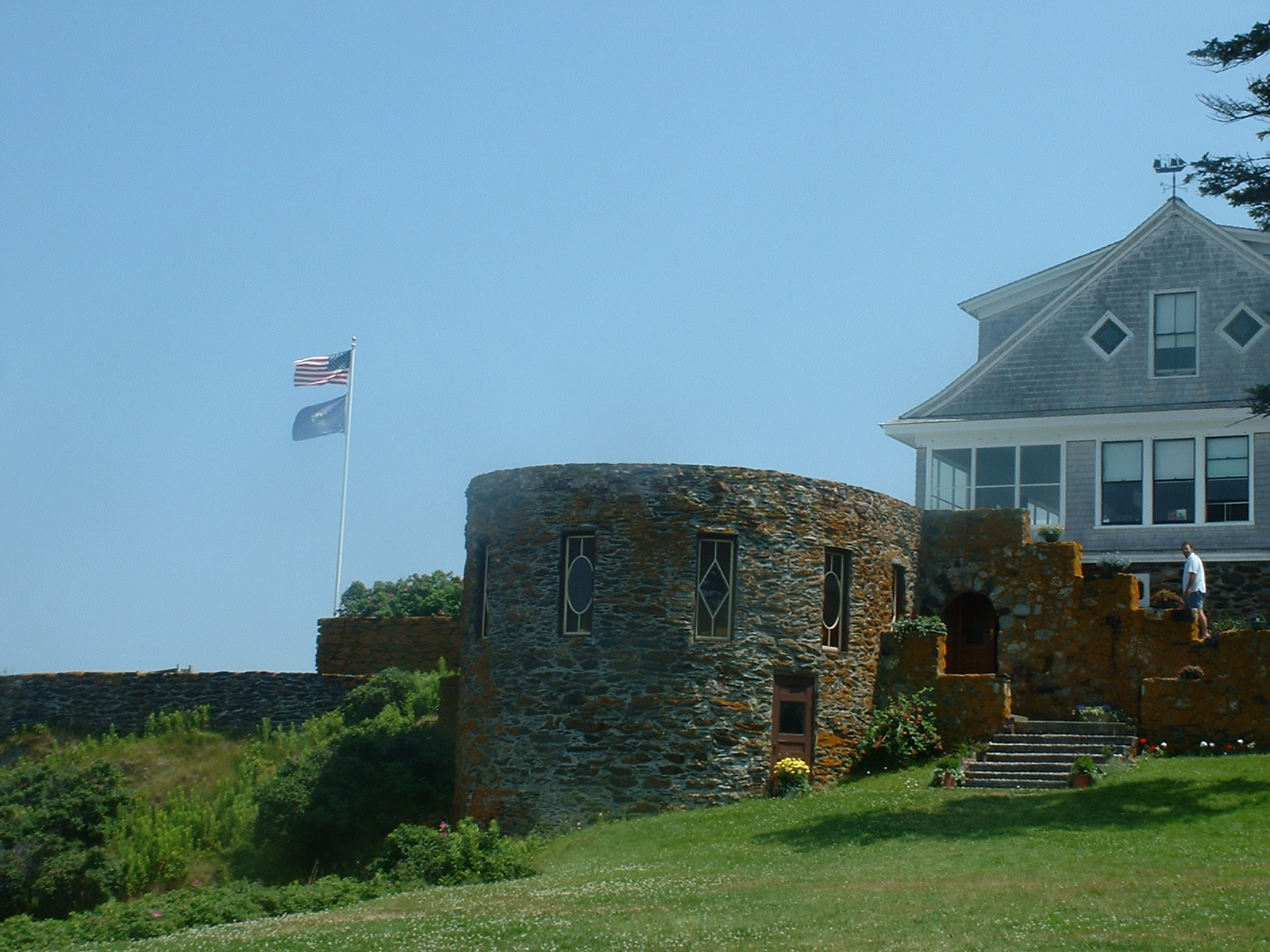

- Location within Maine
- Interactive map of Eagle Island
- Nearest city: Harpswell, Maine
- Coordinates: 43°42′40″N 70°3′10″W
- Area: 17 acres (6.9 ha)
- Built: 1904
- NRHP reference No.: 71000069

Significant dates
- Added to NRHP: November 23, 1971
- Designated NHL: August 25, 2014

Eagle Island is an island in Maine's Casco Bay and the site of the summer home of the North Pole explorer Admiral Robert Peary (1856–1920). The island and home are preserved as the Eagle Island State Historic Site.

== History ==
Peary purchased the island in 1881 for $200 and built a summer house there in 1904. His family continued to spend summers on the island until Peary's children donated the property to the State of Maine in 1967. Eagle Island was listed on the National Register of Historic Places in 1971 and declared a National Historic Landmark in 2014.

== Description ==
Island

Eagle Island is a 17-acre (6.9 ha) island in the outermost portion of the archipelago of Casco Bay. Administratively part of Harpswell, it is located 12 miles (19 km) northeast of Portland, approximately 2 miles from the end of Harpswell Neck, and 15 miles (24 km) south of Brunswick. The island has a maximum height of 40 feet (12 m) above sea level, and is rocky with a thin layer of topsoil. The forest on the island was replanted by the Pearys and contains species atypical of other island forests. There are trails providing access to most of the island.

The island was purchased by Admiral Peary in 1881. At the northern end of the island is a Y-shaped clearing in which the site's buildings are located, and a small beach area with a long wooden pier. There are three major structures on the island in addition to the pier: the Peary house, a caretaker's cabin, and a visitor center. The pier was built in 1969 and the visitor center in 2012. The gardens on the island were planted by Josephine Peary, daughter Marie Ahnighito Peary, and daughter-in-law Inez and are maintained by volunteers. Each year about 6,000 tourists visit the island.

Estate

The Peary House is a wood-frame house, built in several stages. The original portion of the house was built in 1904, and consisted of a rectangular structure with a single large living room on the first floor and three bedrooms on the second floor. Meals were prepared in the caretaker's house, an apparently inadequate situation that prompted the construction of a small kitchen and dining wing in 1906. A new fieldstone foundation with concrete piers was built, raising the structure onto a full-height basement, and shed-roof dormers were added to each side of the gabled roof. Following his retirement, Peary embarked on a further expansion of the building in 1912–13. The 1906 kitchen wing was detached, and a new expanded wing added, with a porch on three sides. Peary also built a pair of circular stone bastions, which served in part as a retaining wall to keep the house from being blown into the water during stormy weather. One of these bastions Peary used to house his artifact collection from his many expeditions.

After Peary's death in 1920, his family made only modest alterations before giving the property to the state in 1967. The state built the pier and undertook restoration of the property, which had suffered deterioration due to weather. A portion of the Peary house's roof caved in during 1990, resulting in water damage to Peary's study, and necessitating reconstruction of that part of the house.

== See also ==
- List of National Historic Landmarks in Maine
- National Register of Historic Places listings in Cumberland County, Maine
- List of islands of Maine
