= Ellsworth Huntington =

American geographer (1876–1947)

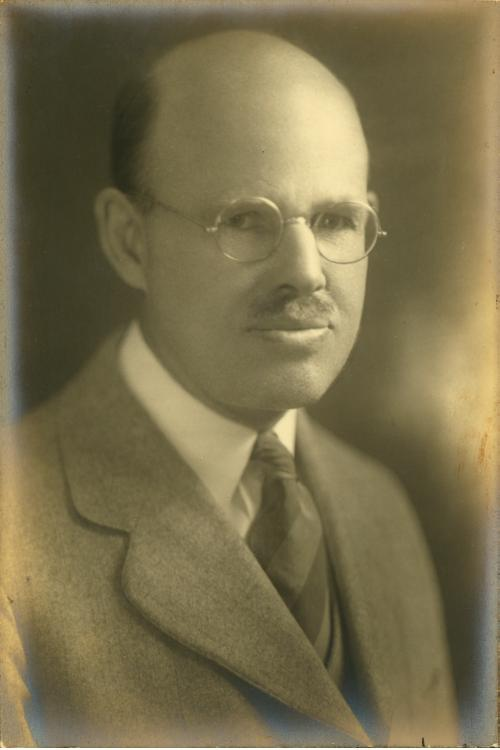
- Born: September 16, 1876
- Died: October 17, 1947 (aged 71)
- Education: Beloit College; Harvard University; Yale University
- Scientific career
- Fields: Geography; Climatology Human Ecology
- Workplaces: Yale University

Ellsworth Huntington (September 16, 1876 – October 17, 1947) was a professor of geography at Yale University during the early 20th century, known for his studies on environmental determinism/climatic determinism, economic growth, and economic geography. He served as president of the Ecological Society of America in 1917, the Association of American Geographers in 1923 and president of the board of directors of the American Eugenics Society from 1934 to 1938.

He taught at Euphrates College, Turkey (1897–1901); accompanied the Pumpelly (1903) and Barrett (1905–1906) expeditions to central Asia; and wrote of his Asian experiences in Explorations in Turkestan (1905) and The Pulse of Asia (1907). He taught geography at Yale (1907–1915) and from 1917 was a research associate there, devoting his time chiefly to climatic and anthropogeographic studies. He was the 1916 recipient of the Elisha Kent Kane Gold Medal from the Geographical Society of Philadelphia.

In 1909, Huntington led the Yale Expedition to Palestine. It was his mission to determine "step by step the process by which geologic structure, topographic form, and the present and past nature of the climate have shaped man's progress, moulded his history; and thus played an incalculable part in the development of a system of thought which could scarcely have arisen under any other physical circumstances."

During the Progressive Era, Huntington expressed concern about immigration and the race mixing. He claimed that liberal immigration policy would lead to the "highest racial values" being "irrevocably swamped by those of lower calibre."

He was on the original standing committee of the Foundation for the Study of Cycles from 1941.

== Bibliography ==
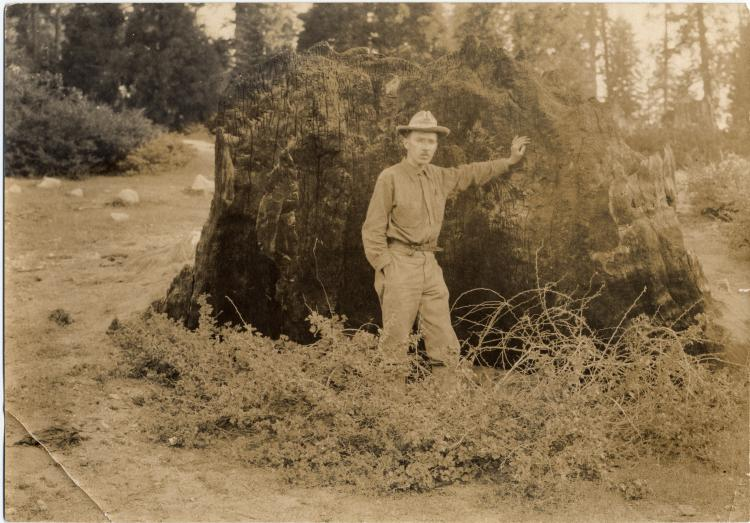
Ellsworth Huntington at the Mill Spring, California, tree ring study, 1911

- Explorations in Turkestan: With an Account of the Basin of Eastern Persia and Sistan, Expedition of 1903, under the Direction of Raphael Pumpelly (1905)
- The Pulse of Asia: A Journey in Central Asia Illustrating the Geographic Basis of History (1907)
- Palestine and Its Transformation (1911)
- "Changes of Climate and History," American Historical Review Vol. 18, No. 2 (Jan., 1913), pp. 213–232 in JSTOR
- The Climatic Factor As Illustrated in Arid America (1914)
- Civilization and Climate (1915, rev. ed. 1924)
- "Climatic Change and Agricultural Exhaustion as Elements in the Fall of Rome," Quarterly Journal of Economics Vol. 31, No. 2 (Feb., 1917), pp. 173–208 in JSTOR
- The Red Man's Continent: A Chronicle of Aboriginal America (1919)
- World-power and Evolution (1919)
- The Secret of the Big Trees: Yosemite Sequoia and General Grant National Parks (1921)
- Climatic Changes with Stephen Sargent Visher (1922)
- The Character Of Races (1924) ISBN 0-405-09955-X
- West of the Pacific (1925)
- Human Habitat (1927)
- "Agricultural Productivity and Pressure of Population," Annals of the American Academy of Political and Social Science Vol. 198, Present International Tensions (Jul., 1938), pp. 73–92 in JSTOR
- Principles of Human Geography (with S. W. Cushing, 5th ed. 1940)
- "The Geography of Human Productivity," Annals of the Association of American Geographers Vol. 33, No. 1 (Mar., 1943), pp. 1–31 in JSTOR
- Mainsprings of Civilization (1945)
