= Irene Bay =

Bay in Nunavut, Canada

- Location within Nunavut
- Location: Eureka Sound
- Coordinates: 79°00′N 81°47′W
- Ocean/sea sources: Arctic Ocean
- Basin countries: Canada
- Settlements: Uninhabited

Irene Bay is an Arctic waterway in the Qikiqtaaluk Region. Nunavut, Canada. It is located in Eureka Sound by western Ellesmere Island.

== Geography ==
The Sverdrup Pass, a 109 km (68 mi) long travel route across the island, extends from Irene Bay to Flagler Bay.

== Flora ==
In the late 1980s, several sites of fossilized tree stumps and branches were found on its northern shore, an area now characterized by Arctic willow shrubs.
