= Peary expedition to Greenland of 1891–1892 =

American Arctic expedition

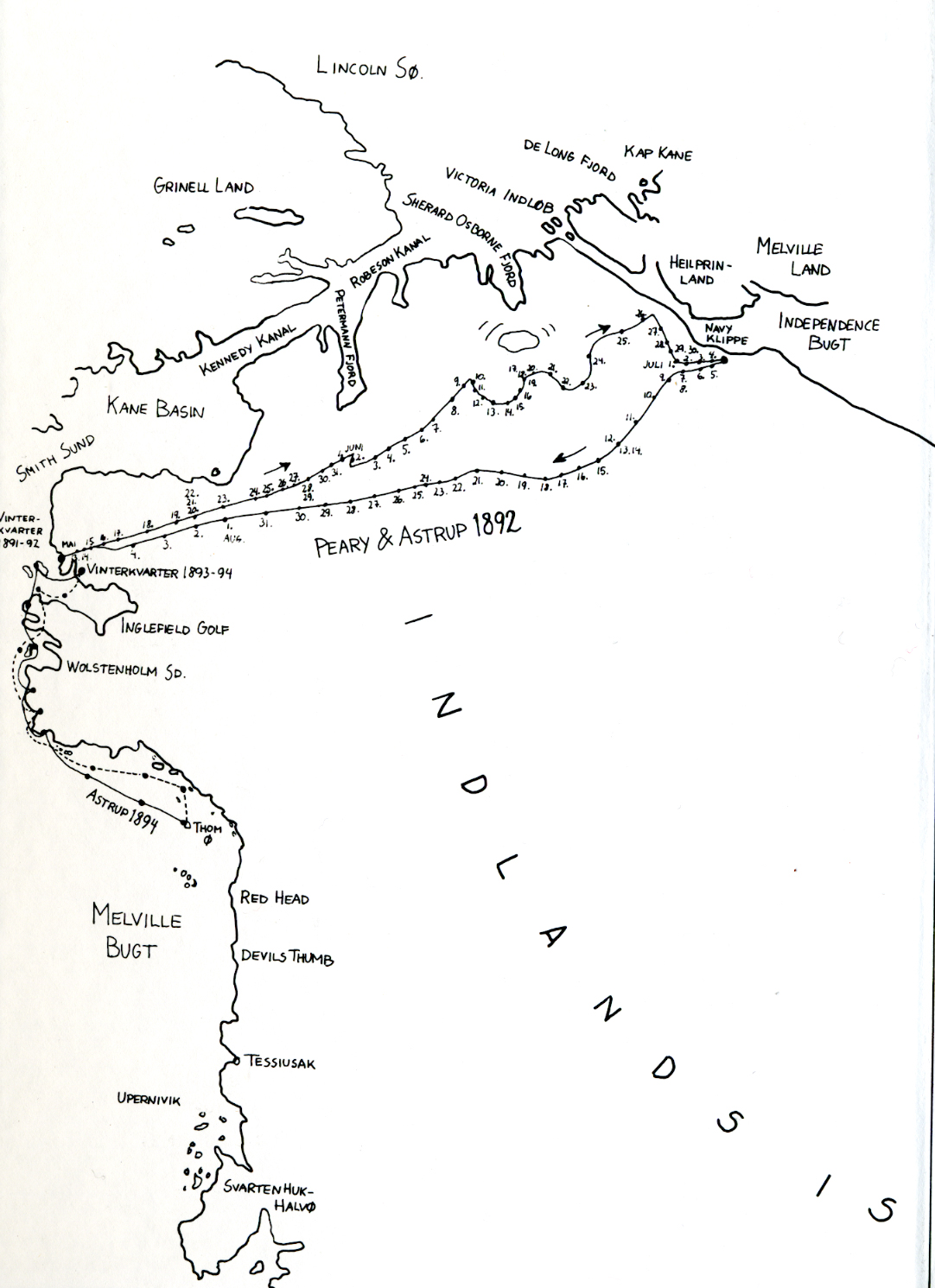
Eivind Astrup's map of the expedition's route (1895)

The Peary expedition to Greenland of 1891–1892 was an expedition undertaken by the American explorer Robert Peary to determine whether Greenland was an island or a peninsula of the North Pole.

== History ==
Peary sailed from Brooklyn, New York, on June 6, 1891 aboard the SS Kite. Josephine Diebitsch Peary, his wife, was aboard, making her the first woman to go on an arctic expedition.

An expedition to find Peary was organized by the Philadelphia Academy of Natural Sciences in 1892.

== Crew ==
Peary's crew consisted of the following people:

- Dr. Frederick Albert Cook, surgeon and ethnologist
- John M. Verhoeff, mineralogist and meteorologist
- Langdon Gibson, ornithologist
- Matthew Alexander Henson, Eivind Astrup
- Josephine Diebitsch Peary, who was Peary's wife
- He was accompanied by Professors Benjamin Sharp and J. F. Holt, both zoologists from the academy.
- William E. Hughes, ornithologist
- Dr. Robert N. Keely, Jr., surgeon
- Levi Walter Mengel, entomologist
- Alexander C. Kenealy, correspondent of the New York Herald
- Frazer Ashhurst and W. H. Burk

The relief expedition comprised:

- Angelo Heilprin, curator of the Philadelphia Academy of Natural Sciences,
- Henry G. Bryant
- Jackson M. Mills, surgeon
