= Sverdrup Pass =

Mountain pass in Nunavut, Canada

- Location within Nunavut

Third Approach
- Location: Nunavut, Canada
- Coordinates: 79°08′06″N 80°29′52″W
- Topo map: NTS 49H1 (untitled)

Sverdrup Pass is a mountain pass in central Ellesmere Island, Nunavut, Canada, located just north of the Prince of Wales Icefield between the heads of Irene Bay and Flagler Bay.

On 27 May 2013, researchers from the University of Alberta found samples of 400-year-old bryophytes that were still alive and viable. The specimens were found in an area vacated by the retreating Teardrop Glacier, near Sverdrup Pass. The bryophytes had most likely been buried under ice during the Little Ice Age.
