= Peary Bay =

Bay in Nunavut, Canada

- Location within Nunavut
- Location: Nares Strait
- Coordinates: 79°14′N 75°50′W
- Ocean/sea sources: Arctic Ocean
- Basin countries: Canada
- Settlements: Uninhabited

Peary Bay is an Arctic waterway in the Qikiqtaaluk Region, Nunavut, Canada. It is located in Nares Strait by eastern Ellesmere Island between the Cook Peninsula and the Bache Peninsula.

It was named in honour of the American explorer Robert Peary by Norwegian oceanographer and meteorologist Harald Sverdrup.
