= Bache Peninsula =

Peninsula in Nunavut, Canada

Location in Nunavut
Bache Peninsula (Canada)

Bache Peninsula is a geological formation in Canada, on Ellesmere Island in Nunavut. The peninsula is considered a cape', meaning that it is a headland that dramatically affects the ocean currents. It is primarily known for being the site of the world's northernmost permanent settlement from 1926 to 1933, a Royal Canadian Mounted Police post.

== Geography ==
The peninsula is adjacent to water on three sides: Peary Bay to the north, named after United States explorer Robert Peary, to the east is Bartlett Bay, and Buchanan Bay to the south. A relatively narrow isthmus connects the peninsula to the rest of Ellesmere Island to the west.

== Archaeological history ==
The peninsula is thought to have been inhabited approximately 4,200 years ago by hunting bands originating in northeast Asia and Alaska. Stone tools and artistic carvings have been found, dating back to the Dorset culture. Researchers have also found Thule hunting artifacts at strategic locations for hunting sea mammals.
