= Josephine Diebitsch Peary =

American explorer (1863–1955)

Josephine Cecilia Diebitsch Peary
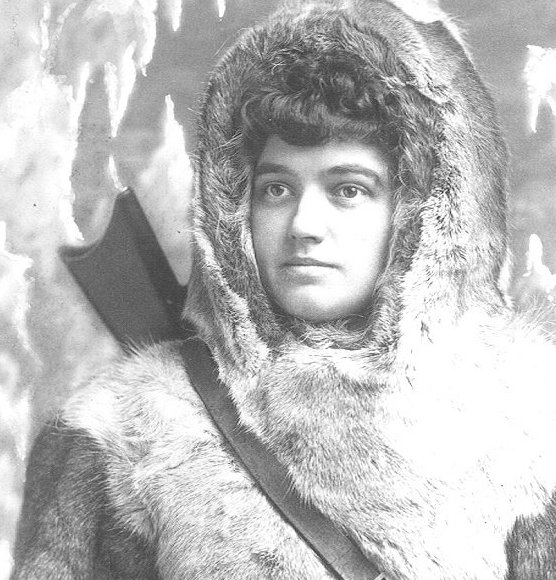
- Josephine Diebitsch in 1892
- Born: Josephine Cecilia Diebitsch; May 22, 1863; Maryland
- Died: December 19, 1955 (aged 92)
- Occupations: Explorer, Author
- Spouse: Robert Edwin Peary (m. 1888; died 1920)
- Children: 2

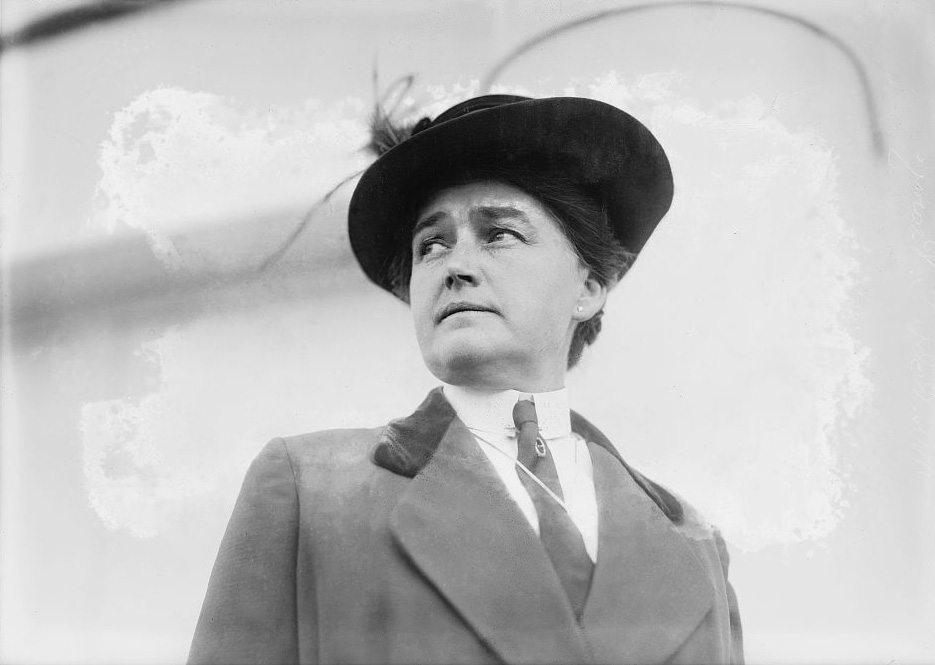
Peary circa 1913

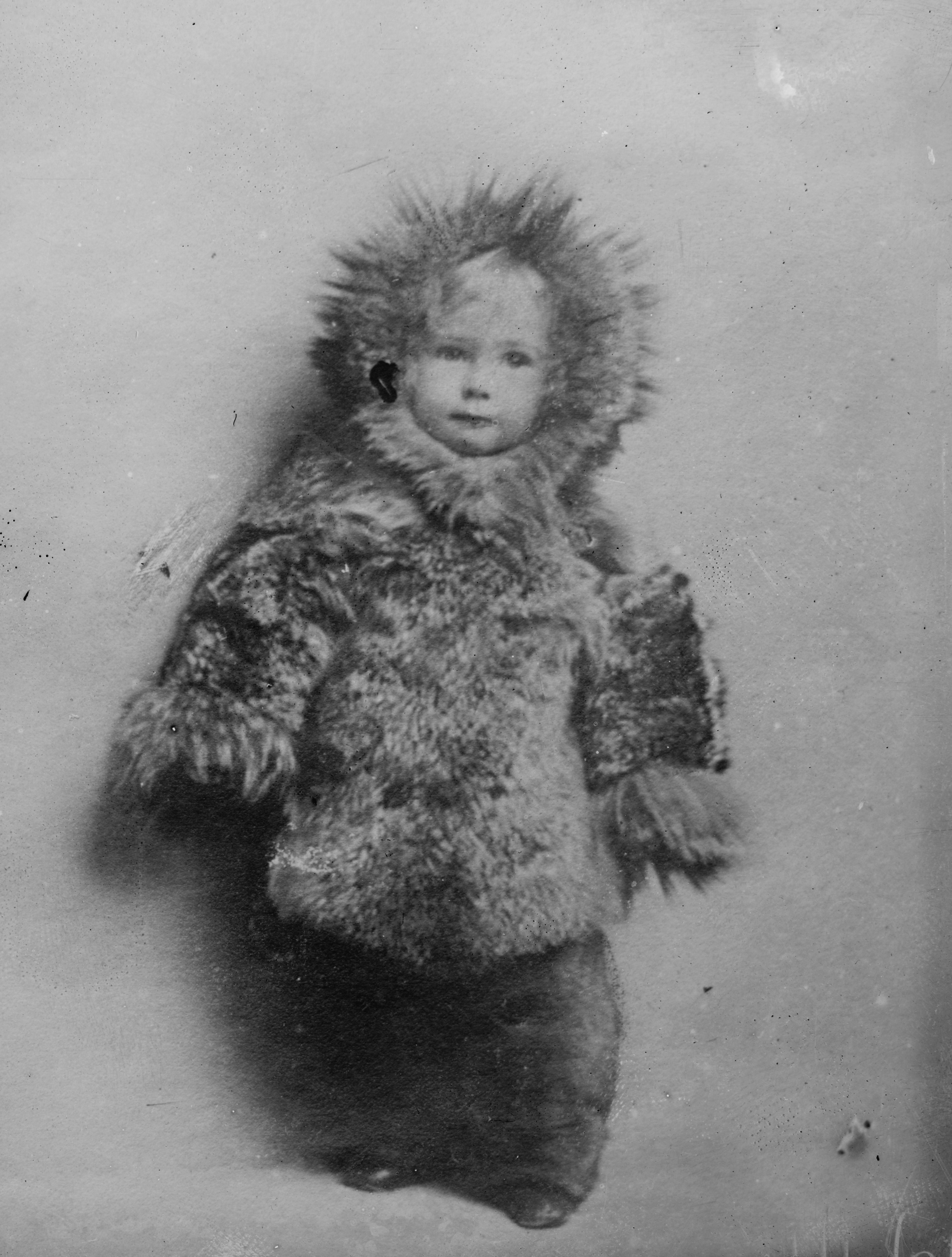
Peary's daughter, Marie Ahnighito Peary (1893-1978), pictured in childhood

Josephine Cecilia Peary (née Diebitsch; May 22, 1863 – December 19, 1955) was an American author and arctic explorer. She was the wife of Robert Peary, who claimed to be the first to have reached the geographic North Pole.

== Early life ==
Josephine Cecilia Diebitsch was born on May 22, 1863 on a farm in Maryland. Her mother, Magdalena Augusta (Schmid) Diebitsch, was from Saxony. Her father, Hermann Henry Diebitsch, was a military officer from Prussia. During the American Civil War, the Diebitsch family farm was destroyed, which led the family to relocate to Washington, D.C. Hermann was a clerk at the Smithsonian Institution. She had a brother, Emil Diebitsch, who later became the mayor of Nutley, New Jersey, and a sister, Marie Diebitsch.

Josephine attended Spencerian Business College and graduated as the class valedictorian in 1880. She found herself qualified and on track for a copyist, clerk, and tallyist position at the Smithsonian Institution and the United States Department of the Interior. Josephine wrote My Arctic Journal (1893) during the Peary expedition to Greenland of 1891–1892.

== Marriage and family ==
Josephine first met Robert Peary in 1885 while she was attending dancing school. They got engaged in 1886, at which time she resigned from the Smithsonian Institution. She married him on August 11, 1888. She often accompanied him on his northern travels, where she traveled farther north over the ice fields than any white woman had before. Her eagerness to explore the world prompted her to accompany her husband on the Peary expedition to Greenland of 1891–1892. She accompanied him on six of his Arctic expeditions and was considered a First Lady of the Arctic. While they were married, in 1909, Robert Peary claimed to be the first to have reached the geographic North Pole. At that time, Josephine stayed home on Eagle Island in Casco Bay, Maine, which Robert bought in 1877.

Josephine and Robert had three children: Marie Ahnighito Peary born in 1893, who became known as "Snow Baby", was born less than thirteen degrees from the North Pole, a second daughter, Francine, born in 1899 who died at 7 months, and a son, Robert E. Peary Jr born in 1903. Although both surviving children were Arctic adventurers, Robert Jr. became a construction engineer. They also had three grandchildren, Edward Peary Stafford, Robert E. Peary III, and Peary Diebitsch Stafford.

== Later life and death ==
In 1914, the Pearys bought the house at 1831 Wyoming Avenue NW in the Adams Morgan neighborhood of Washington, D.C. Robert Peary began renovating the house in 1920, shortly before his death, after which the renovation was taken over by Josephine. Josephine sold the house in 1927, receiving a $12,000 promissory note.

She moved to Portland, Maine, in 1932.

She died on December 19, 1955, at the age of 92.

== Works ==
- My Arctic Journal (1893)
- The Snow Baby (1901)
- Children of the Arctic (1903)

== Awards and Accomplishments ==
- Granted the National Geographic Society's highest honor, the Medal of Achievement, for her Arctic accomplishments.
- A charter member of the Philadelphia Geographic Society as well as the Appalachian Mountain Club.
- An honorary member of a Woman Geographers Club.
