= Geographical Society of Philadelphia =

American scientific society

The Geographical Society of Philadelphia was founded by Angelo Heilprin in 1891 "to promote the discovery and appreciation of the many wonders of our world." Through grants, it has supported major explorations. It also sponsors educational programs related to geography, science, and history.

The Society has status as a 501(c)(3) Public Charity; in 2016, it claimed total revenue of $50,273 and total assets of $150,261.

It awards the Elisha Kent Kane Gold Medal, named for Elisha Kane, "for eminent geographical research." Recipients have included Robert E. Peary (1902), Robert F. Scott (1904), Roald Amundsen (1907), Ernest Shackleton (1910), Ellsworth Huntington (1916), Vilhjalmur Stefansson (1919), Richard E. Byrd (1926), Thor Heyerdahl, Alexander H. Rice, and Rachel Carson.

== Publications ==
- Bulletin of the Geographical Society of Philadelphia
