= Robert Peary =

American explorer (1856–1920)

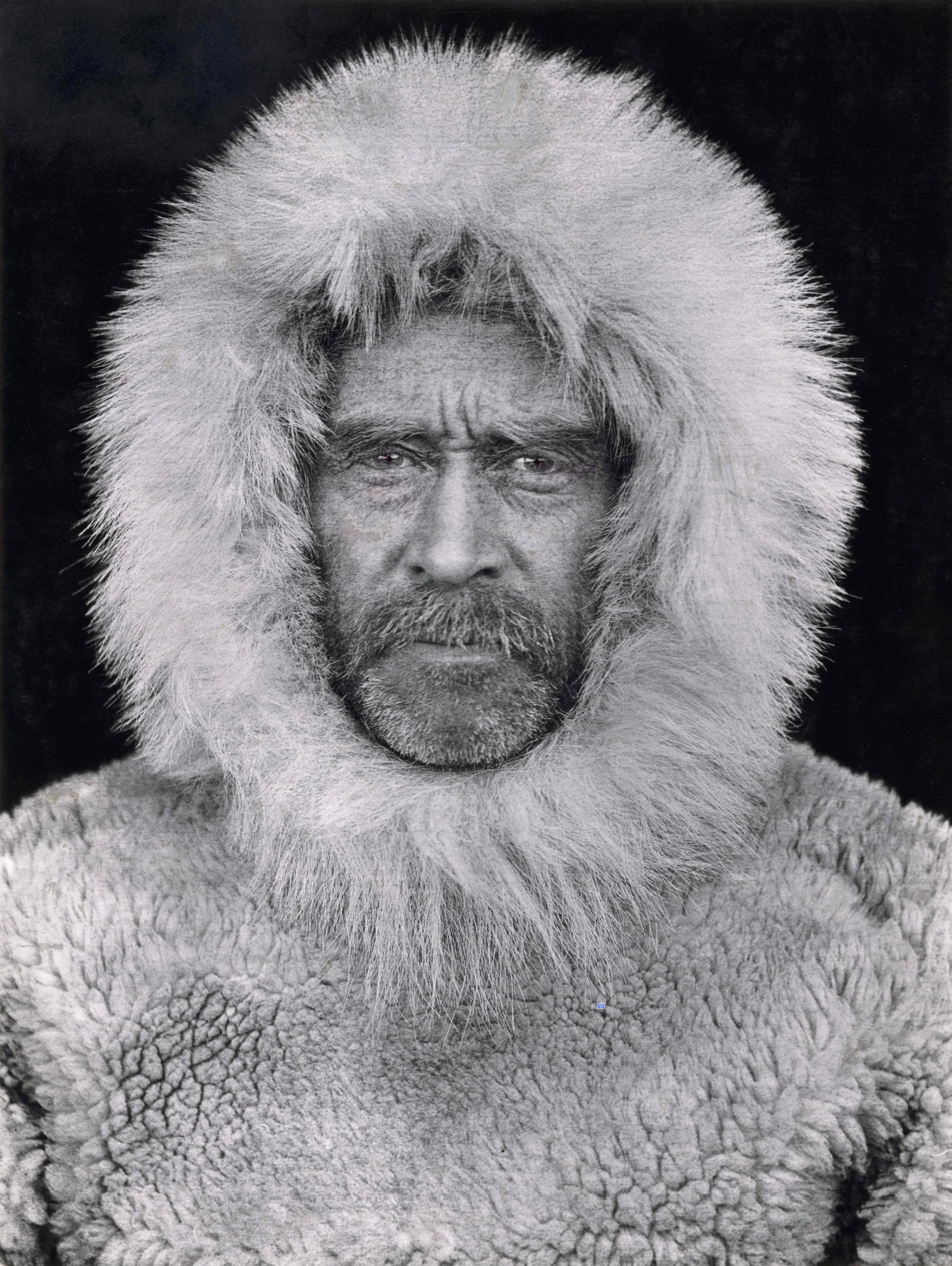
- At Cape Sheridan on Ellesmere Island, 1909
- Born: Robert Edwin Peary; May 6, 1856; Cresson, Pennsylvania, U.S.
- Died: February 20, 1920 (aged 63); Washington, D.C., U.S.
- Resting place: Arlington National Cemetery
- Education: Bowdoin College
- Known for: Reaching the geographic North Pole (claimed)
- Spouse: Josephine Diebitsch (m. 1888)
- Children: 4
- Awards: Cullum Geographical Medal; Charles P. Daly Medal; Hubbard Medal
- Military career
- Allegiance: United States
- Branch: United States Navy
- Service years: 1881–1911
- Rank: Rear admiral
- Unit: Civil Engineer Corps

Robert Edwin Peary (/ˈpɪəri/; May 6, 1856 – February 20, 1920) was an American explorer and officer in the United States Navy who made several expeditions to the Arctic in the late 19th and early 20th centuries. He was long credited as being the discoverer of the geographic North Pole in April 1909, having led the first expedition to have claimed this achievement, although it is now considered unlikely that he actually reached the Pole.

Peary was born in Cresson, Pennsylvania, but, following his father's death at a young age, was raised in Cape Elizabeth, Maine. He attended Bowdoin College, then joined the United States Coast and Geodetic Survey as a draftsman. He enlisted in the navy in 1881 as a civil engineer. In 1885, he was made chief of surveying for the Nicaragua Canal, which was never built. He visited the Arctic for the first time in 1886, making an unsuccessful attempt to cross Greenland by dogsled. In the Peary expedition to Greenland of 1891–1892, he was much better prepared, and by reaching Independence Fjord in what is now known as Peary Land, he proved conclusively that Greenland was an island. He was one of the first Arctic explorers to study Inuit survival techniques. (Note: Many Inuit consider the term "Eskimo" to be unacceptable and even pejorative, although it continues to be used within historical, linguistic, archaeological, and cultural contexts.) During an expedition in 1894, he was the first Western explorer to reach the Cape York meteorite and its fragments, which were then taken from the native Inuit population who had relied on it for creating tools. During that expedition, Peary deceived six indigenous individuals, including Minik Wallace, into traveling to the United States with him by promising they would be able to return with tools, weapons and gifts within the year. This promise was unfulfilled and four of the six Inuit died of illnesses within a few months.

On his 1898–1902 expedition, Peary set a new "Farthest North" record by reaching Greenland's northernmost point, Cape Morris Jesup. Peary made two more expeditions to the Arctic, in 1905–1906 and in 1908–1909. During the latter, he claimed to have reached the North Pole. Peary received several learned society awards during his lifetime, and, in 1911, received the Thanks of Congress and was promoted to rear admiral. He served two terms as president of the Explorers Club before retiring in 1911.

Peary's claim to have reached the North Pole was widely debated along with a competing claim made by Frederick Cook, but eventually won widespread acceptance. In 1989, British explorer Wally Herbert concluded Peary did not reach the pole, although he may have come within 60 mi (97 km).

== Early life, education, and career ==
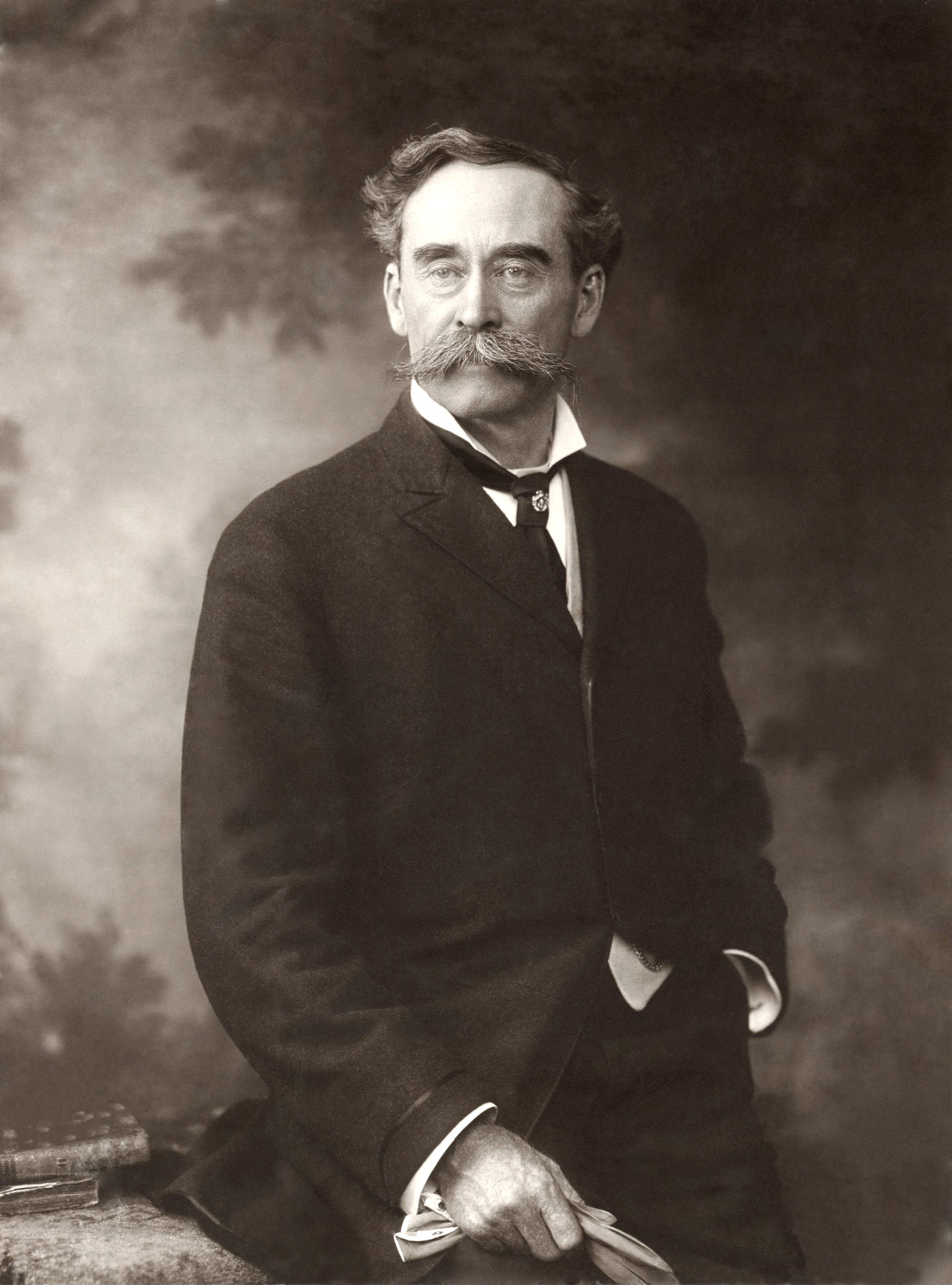
Peary c. 1900

Robert Edwin Peary was born on May 6, 1856, in Cresson, Pennsylvania, to Charles N. and Mary P. Peary. After his father died in 1859, Peary and his mother moved to Portland, Maine. Peary attended Portland High School (Maine) where he graduated in 1873. Peary made his way to Bowdoin College, some 30 mi (48 km) to the northeast, where he was a member of the Delta Kappa Epsilon fraternity and the Phi Beta Kappa honor society. He was also part of the rowing team. He graduated in 1877 with a civil engineering degree.

From 1878 to 1879, Peary lived in Fryeburg, Maine. During that time, he made a profile survey from the top of Fryeburg's Jockey Cap Rock. The 360-degree survey names the larger hills and mountains visible from the summit. After Peary's death, his boyhood friend, Alfred E. Burton, suggested that the profile survey be made into a monument. It was cast in bronze and set atop a granite cylinder and erected to his memory by the Peary family in 1938.

After college, Peary worked as a draftsman making technical drawings at the United States Coast and Geodetic Survey office in Washington, D.C. He joined the United States Navy and on October 26, 1881, was commissioned in the Civil Engineer Corps, with the relative rank of lieutenant. From 1884 to 1885, he was an assistant engineer on the surveys for the Nicaragua Canal and later became the engineer in charge. As reflected in a diary entry he made in 1885, during his time in the Navy, he resolved to be the first man to reach the North Pole.

In April 1886, he wrote a paper for the National Academy of Sciences proposing two methods for crossing Greenland's ice cap. One was to start from the west coast and trek about 400 mi (640 km) to the east coast. The second, more difficult path, was to start from Whale Sound at the top of the known portion of Baffin Bay and travel north to determine whether Greenland was an island or if it extended all the way across the Arctic. Peary was promoted to the rank of lieutenant commander on January 5, 1901, and to commander on April 6, 1902.

== Initial Arctic expeditions ==
Peary made his first expedition to the Arctic in 1886, intending to cross Greenland by dog sled, taking the first of his own suggested paths. He was given six months' leave from the Navy, and he received $500 from his mother to book passage north and buy supplies. He sailed on a whaler to Greenland, arriving in Godhavn on June 6, 1886. Peary wanted to make a solo trek, but Christian Maigaard, a young Danish official, convinced him he would die if he went out alone. Maigaard and Peary set off together and traveled nearly 100 mi (160 km) due east before turning back because they were short on food. This was the second-farthest penetration of Greenland's ice sheet at the time. Peary returned home knowing more of what was required for long-distance ice trekking.

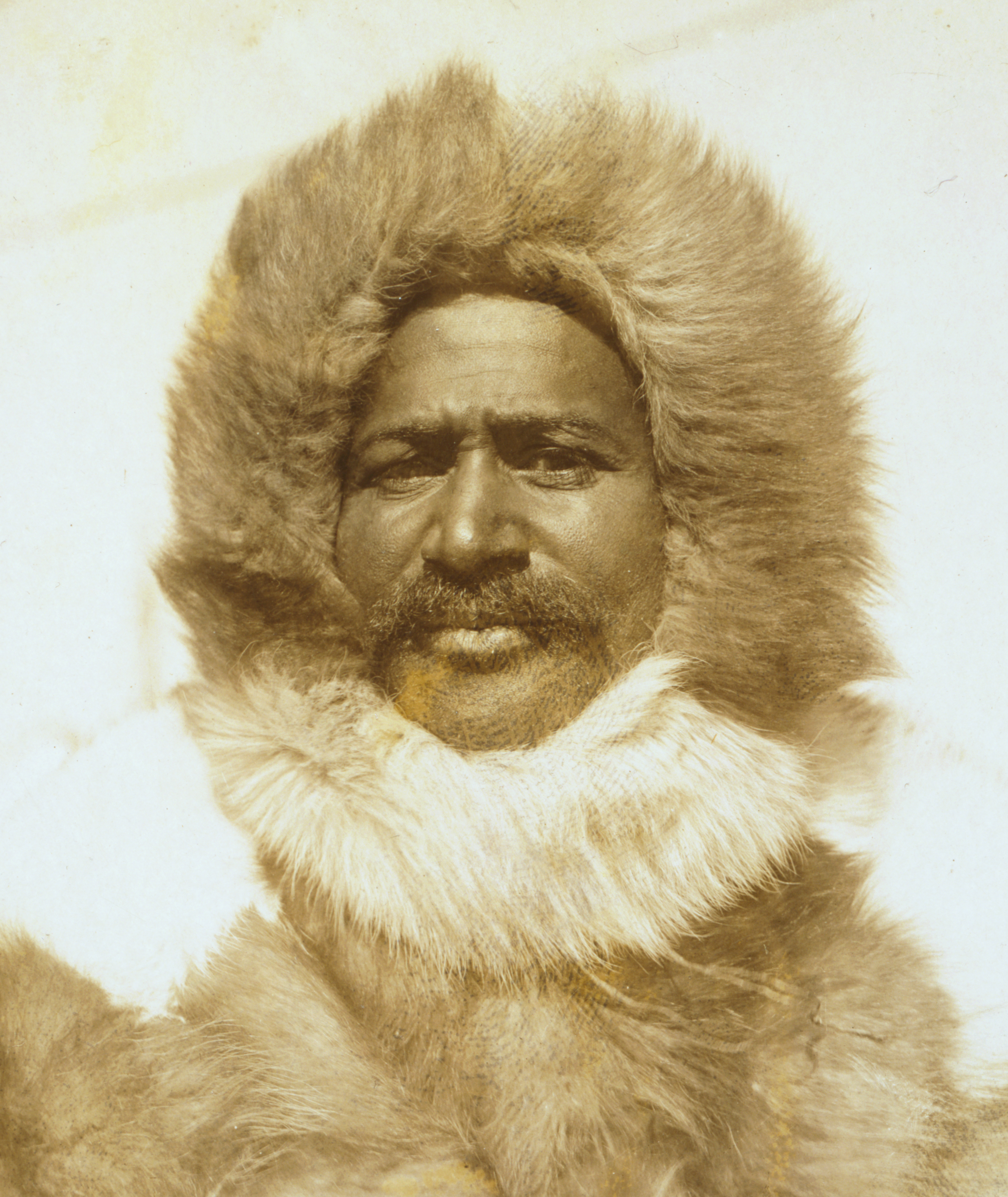
Matthew Henson, Peary's assistant, in 1910

Back in Washington attending with the US Navy, in November 1887 Peary was ordered to survey likely routes for a proposed Nicaragua Canal. To complete his tropical outfit he needed a sun hat. He went to a men's clothing store where he met 21-year-old Matthew Henson, a black man working as a sales clerk. Learning that Henson had six years of seagoing experience as a cabin boy, Peary immediately hired him as a personal valet.

On assignment in the jungles of Nicaragua, Peary told Henson of his dream of Arctic exploration. Henson accompanied Peary on every one of his subsequent Arctic expeditions, becoming his field assistant and "first man", a critical member of his team.

== Second Greenland expedition ==
In the Peary expedition to Greenland of 1891–1892, Peary took the second, more difficult route that he laid out in 1886: traveling farther north to find out whether Greenland was a larger landmass extending to the North Pole. He was financed by several groups, including the American Geographic Society, the Philadelphia Academy of Natural Sciences (now the Academy of Natural Sciences of Drexel University), and the Brooklyn Institute of Arts and Sciences. Members of this expedition included Peary's aide Henson, Frederick A. Cook, who served as the group's surgeon; the expedition's ethnologist, Norwegian skier Eivind Astrup; bird expert and marksman Langdon Gibson, and John M. Verhoeff, who was a weatherman and mineralogist. Peary also took his wife, Josephine, along as dietitian, though she had no formal training. Newspaper reports criticized Peary for bringing his wife.

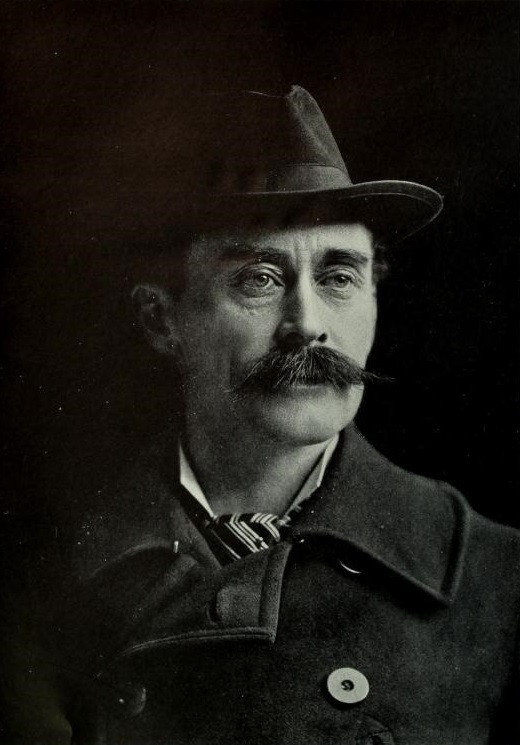
Peary in civilian clothing

On June 6, 1891, the party left Brooklyn, New York, in the seal hunting ship SS Kite. In July, as Kite was ramming through sheets of surface ice, the ship's iron tiller suddenly spun around and broke Peary's lower right leg; both bones snapped between the knee and ankle. Peary was unloaded with the rest of the supplies at a camp they called Red Cliff, at the mouth of MacCormick Fjord at the north west end of Inglefield Gulf. A dwelling was built for his recuperation during the next six months. Josephine Peary stayed with Peary. Gibson, Cook, Verhoeff, and Astrup hunted game by boat and became familiar with the area and the Inuit.

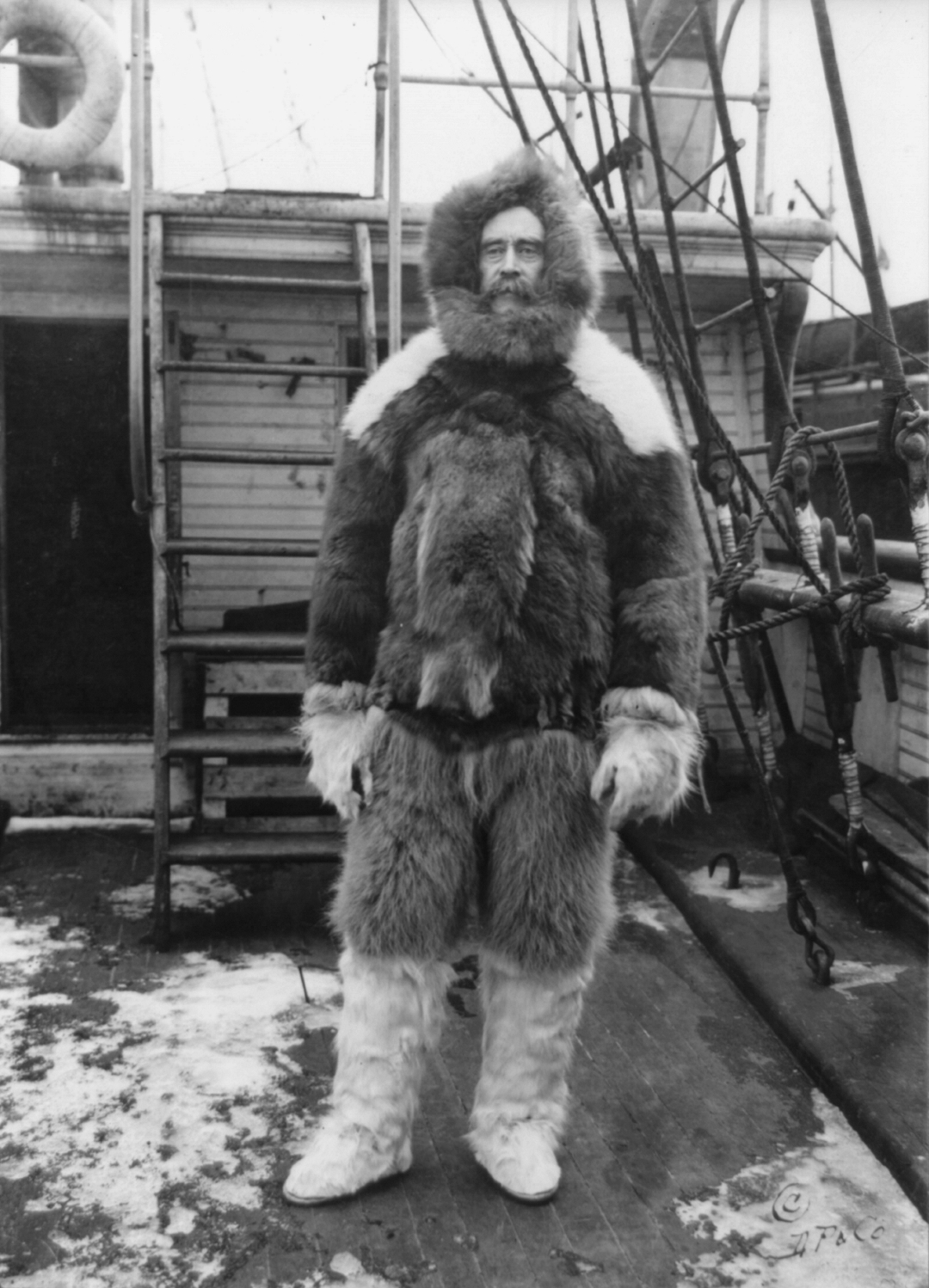
Peary was one of the first Arctic explorers to study Inuit survival techniques.

Unlike most previous explorers, Peary had studied Inuit survival techniques; he built igloos during the expedition and dressed in practical furs in the native fashion. By wearing furs to preserve body heat and building igloos, he was able to dispense with the extra weight of tents and sleeping bags when on the march. Peary also relied on the Inuit as hunters and dog-drivers on his expeditions. He pioneered the system of using support teams and establishing supply caches for Arctic travel, which he called the "Peary system". The Inuit were curious about the Americans and came to visit Red Cliff. Josephine was bothered by the Inuit body odor from not bathing, their flea infestations, and their food. She studied the people and kept a journal of her experiences. In September 1891, Peary's men and dog sled teams pushed inland onto the ice sheet to lay caches of supplies. They did not go farther than 30 mi (48 km) from Red Cliff.

Peary's leg mended by February 1892. By April 1892, he made some short trips with Josephine and an Inuk dog sled driver to native villages to purchase supplies. On May 3, 1892, Peary finally set out on the intended trek with Henson, Gibson, Cook, and Astrup. After 150 mi (240 km), Peary continued on with Astrup. They found the 3,300 ft (1,000 m) high view from Navy Cliff, saw Independence Fjord, and concluded that Greenland was an island, and not connected to some yet unknown landmass further north in the Arctic. They trekked back to Red Cliff and arrived on August 6, having traveled a total of 1,250 mi (2,010 km).

In 1896, Peary, a Master Mason, received his degrees in Kane Lodge No. 454, New York City.

== 1898–1902 expeditions ==
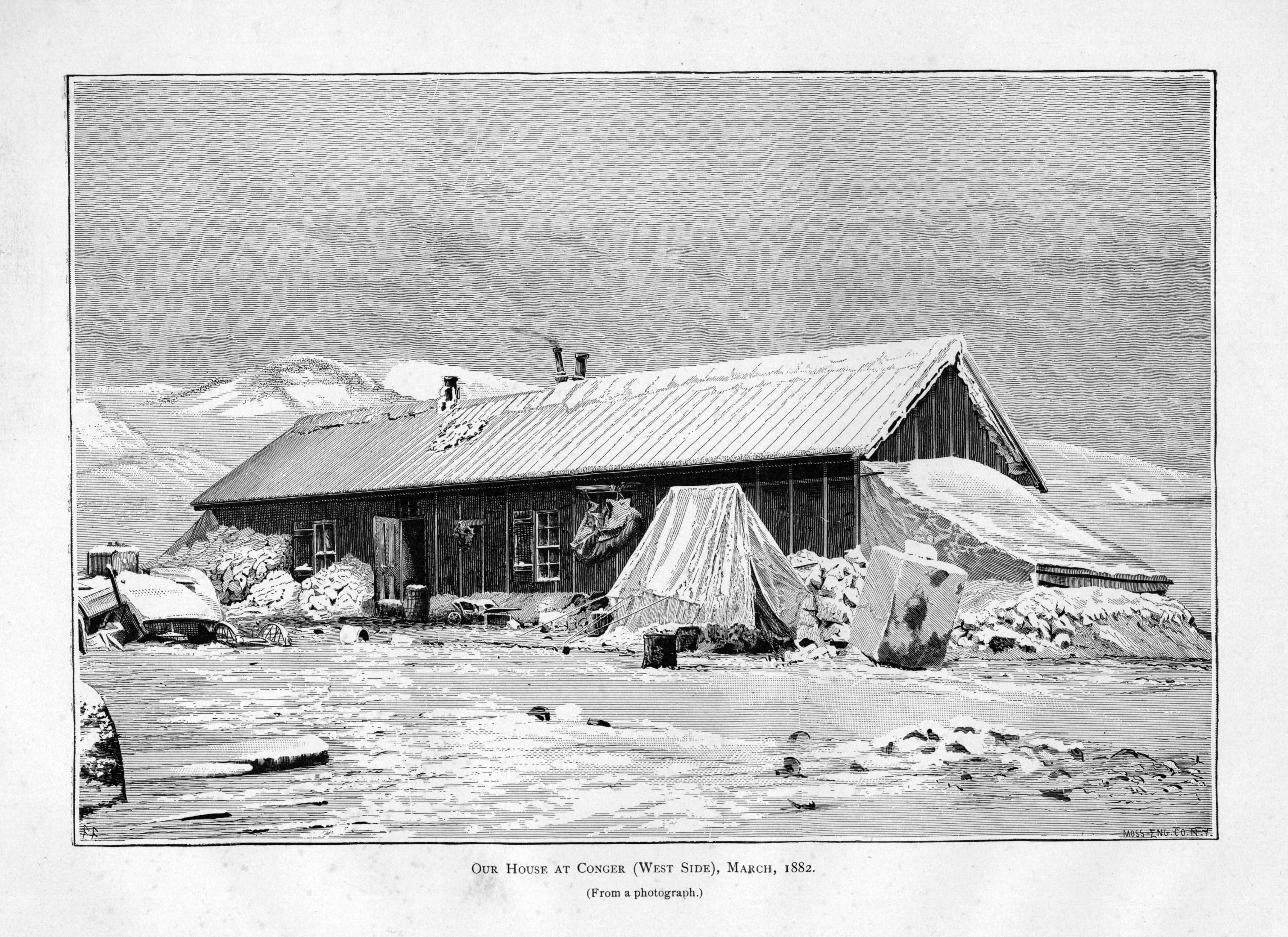
Peary used abandoned Fort Conger on Ellesmere Island during his 1898–1902 expedition

As a result of Peary's 1898–1902 expedition, he claimed an 1899 visual discovery of "Jesup Land" west of Ellesmere Island. He claimed that this sighting of Axel Heiberg Island was prior to its discovery by Norwegian explorer Otto Sverdrup's expedition around the same time. This contention has been universally rejected by exploration societies and historians. However, the American Geographical Society and the Royal Geographical Society of London honored Peary for tenacity, mapping of previously uncharted areas, and his discovery in 1900 of Cape Morris Jesup at the north tip of Greenland. Peary also achieved a "farthest north" for the western hemisphere in 1902 north of Canada's Ellesmere Island. Peary was promoted to lieutenant commander in the Navy in 1901 and to commander in 1902.

== 1905–1906 expedition ==
Peary's next expedition was supported by fundraising through the Peary Arctic Club, with gifts of $50,000 from George Crocker, the youngest son of banker Charles Crocker, and $25,000 from Morris K. Jesup, to buy Peary a new ship. The SS Roosevelt navigated through the ice between Greenland and Ellesmere Island, establishing an American hemisphere "farthest north by ship". The 1906 "Peary System" dogsled drive for the pole across the rough sea ice of the Arctic Ocean started from the north tip of Ellesmere at 83° north latitude. The parties made well under 10 mi (16 km) a day until they became separated by a storm.

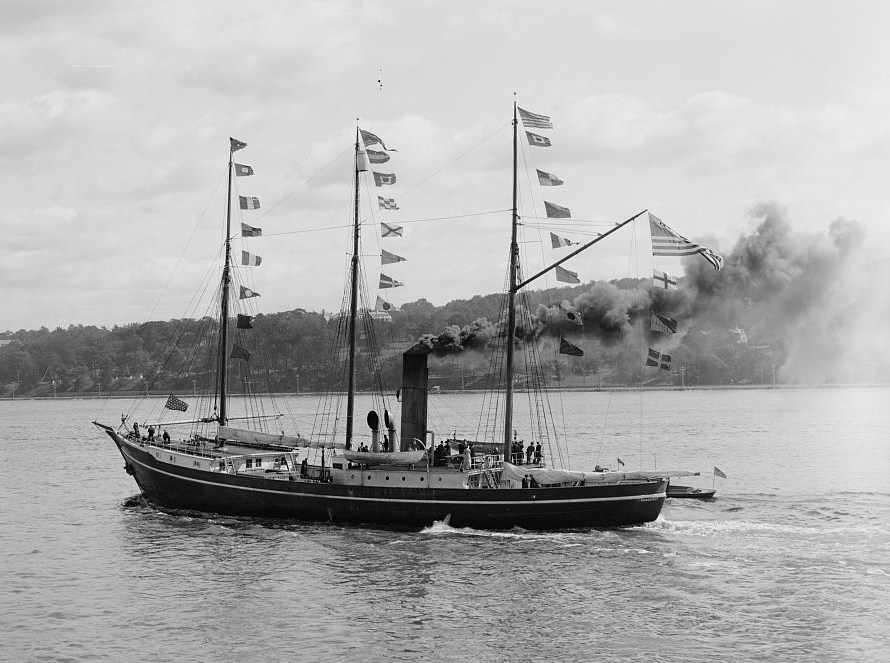
Roosevelt in the Hudson–Fulton parade in 1909

As a result, Peary was without a companion sufficiently trained in navigation to verify his account from that point northward. With insufficient food, and uncertainty whether he could negotiate the ice between himself and land, he made the best possible dash and barely escaped with his life from the melting ice. On April 20, he was no farther north than 86°30' latitude. This latitude was never published by Peary. It is in a typescript of his April 1906 diary, discovered by Wally Herbert in his assessment commissioned by the National Geographic Society. The typescript suddenly stopped there, one day before Peary's April 21 purported "farthest". The original of the April 1906 record is the only missing diary of Peary's exploration career. He claimed the next day to have achieved a Farthest North world record at 87°06' and returned to 86°30' without camping. This implied a trip of at least 72 nautical miles (133 km; 83 mi) between sleeping, even assuming direct travel with no detours.

After returning to Roosevelt in May, Peary began weeks of difficult travel in June heading west along the shore of Ellesmere. He discovered Cape Colgate, from whose summit he claimed in his 1907 book that he had seen a previously undiscovered far-north "Crocker Land" to the northwest on June 24, 1906. A later review of his diary for this time and place found that he had written, "No land visible." On December 15, 1906, the National Geographic Society of the United States, certified Peary's 1905–1906 expedition and "Farthest" with its highest honor, the Hubbard Medal. No major professional geographical society followed suit. In 1914, Donald Baxter MacMillan and Fitzhugh Green, Sr.'s expedition found that Crocker Land did not exist.

== Reaching the North Pole ==
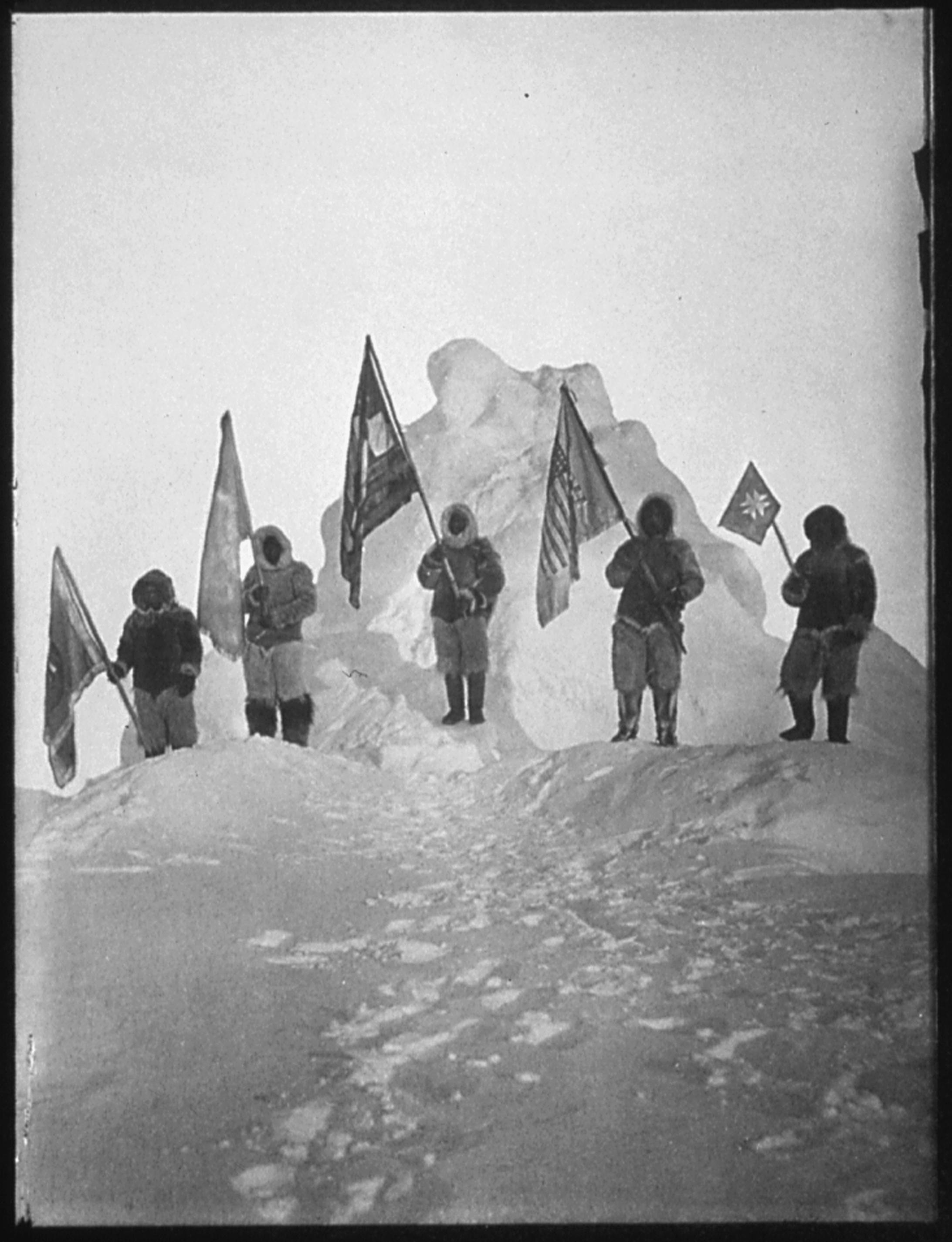
The party at what was assumed to be the North Pole

On July 6, 1908, the Roosevelt departed New York City with Peary's eighth Arctic expedition of 22 men. Besides Peary as expedition commander, it included master of the Roosevelt Robert Bartlett, surgeon Dr. J.W. Goodsell, along with Ross Gilmore Marvin, Donald Baxter MacMillan, George Borup, and Matthew Henson. After recruiting several Inuit and their families at Cape York (Greenland), the expedition wintered near Cape Sheridan on Ellesmere Island. The expedition used the "Peary system" for the sledge journey, with Bartlett and the Inuit, Poodloonah, "Harrigan," and Ooqueah, composing the pioneer division. Borup, with three Inuit, Keshunghaw, Seegloo, and Karko, composed the advance supporting party. On February 15, Bartlett's pioneer division departed the Roosevelt for Cape Columbia, followed by 5 advance divisions. Peary, with the two Inuit, Arco and Kudlooktoo, departed on February 22, bringing to the total effort 7 expedition members, 19 Inuit, 140 dogs, and 28 sledges. On February 28, Bartlett, with three Inuit, Ooqueah, Pooadloonah, and Harrigan, accompanied by Borup, with three Inuit, Karko, Seegloo, and Keshungwah, headed North.

On March 14, the first supporting party, composed of Dr. Goodsell and the two Inuit, Arco and Wesharkoupsi, turned back towards the ship. Peary states this was at a latitude of 84°29'. On March 20, Borup's third supporting party, with three Inuit, started back to the ship. Peary states this was at a latitude of 85°23'. On March 26, Marvin, with Kudlooktoo and Harrigan, headed back to the ship, from a latitude estimated by Marvin as 86°38'. Marvin died on this return trip south. On 1 April, Bartlett's party started their return to the ship, after Bartlett estimated a latitude of 87°46'49". Peary, with two Inuit, Egingwah and Seeglo, and Henson, with two Inuit, Ootah and Ooqueah, using 5 sledges and 40 dogs, planned 5 marches over the estimated 130 nautical miles to the pole. On 2 April, Peary led the way north.

On the final stage of the journey toward the North Pole, Peary told Bartlett to stay behind. He continued with five others: Henson, Ootah, Egigingwah, Seegloo, and Ooqueah. No one except Henson, who had served on the Peary expedition to Greenland of 1891–1892, had experience of naval-type observations. On April 6, 1909, Peary established Camp Jesup within 3 mi (5 km) of the pole, according to his own readings. Peary estimated the latitude as 89°57', after making an observation at approximate local noon using the Columbia meridian. Peary used a sextant, with a mercury trough and glass roof for an artificial horizon, to make measurements of the Sun. Peary claims, "I had now taken in all thirteen single, or six and one-half double, altitudes of the sun, at two different stations, in three different directions, at four different times." Peary states some of these observations were "beyond the Pole," and "...at some moment during these marches and counter-marches, I had passed over or very near the point where north and south and east and west blend into one." Henson scouted ahead to what was thought to be the North Pole site; he returned with the greeting, "I think I'm the first man to sit on top of the world," much to Peary's chagrin.

On April 7, 1909, Peary's group started their return journey, reaching Cape Columbia on April 23, and the Roosevelt on April 26. MacMillan and the doctor's party had reached the ship earlier, on March 21, Borup's party on April 11, Marvin's Inuit on April 17, and Bartlett's party on April 24. On July 18, the Roosevelt departed for home.

Upon returning, Peary learned that Dr. Frederick A. Cook, a surgeon and ethnographer on the Peary expedition to Greenland of 1891–1892, claimed to have reached the North pole in 1908. Despite remaining doubts, a committee of the National Geographic Society, as well as the Naval Affairs Subcommittee of the U.S. House of Representatives, credited Peary with reaching the North Pole.

A reassessment of Peary's notebook in 1988 by polar explorer Wally Herbert found it "lacking in essential data", thus renewing doubts about Peary's discovery.

== Later life and death ==
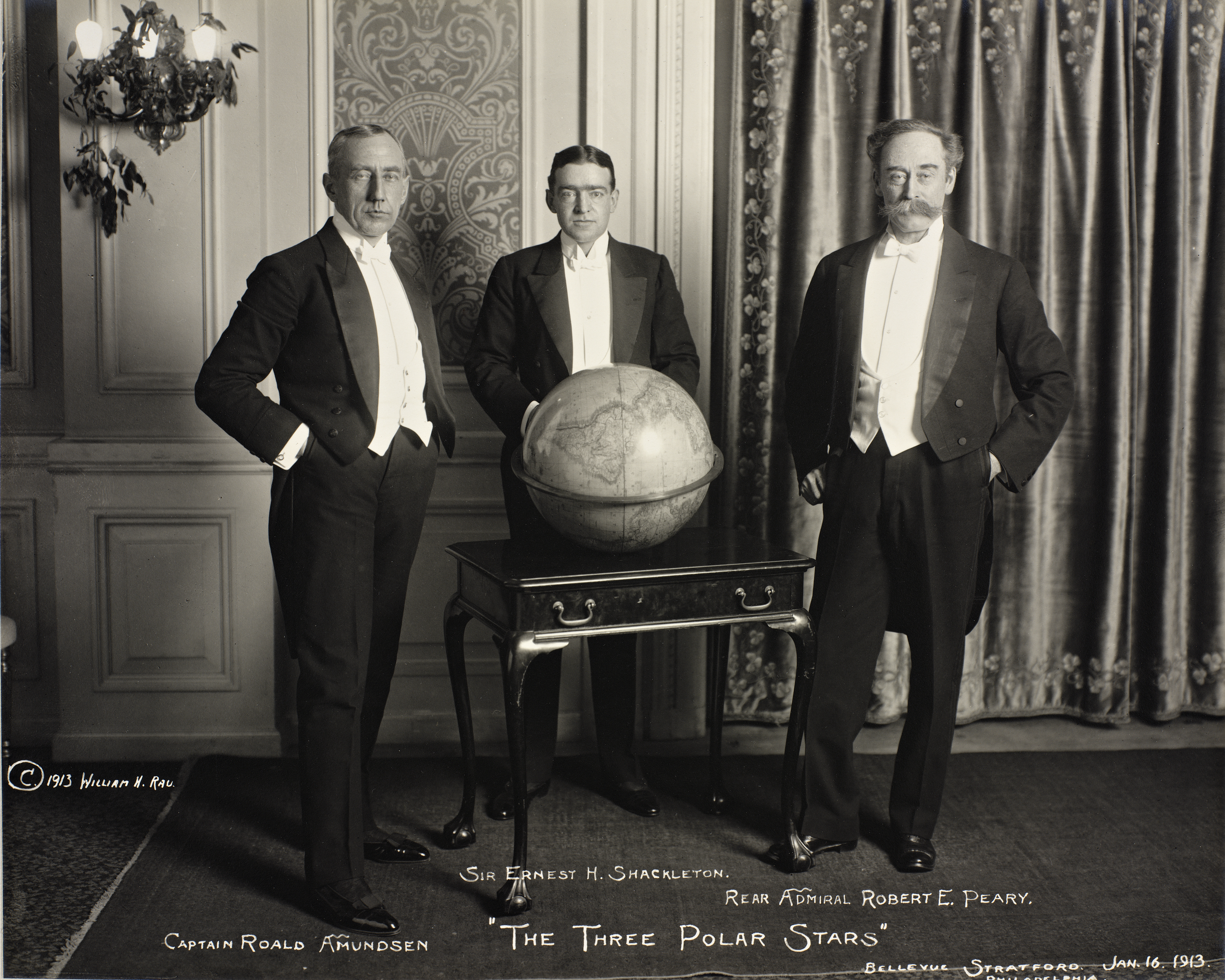
Amundsen, Shackleton, and Peary, in January 1913

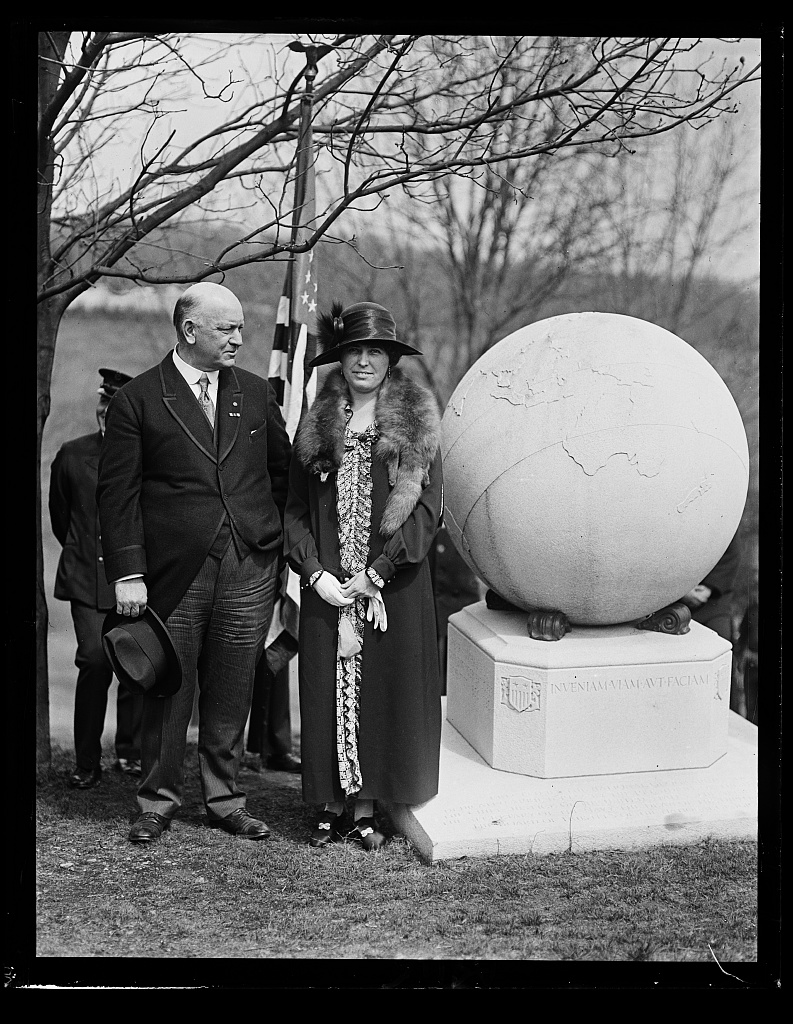
Edwin Denby and Peary's daughter at grave, Arlington National Cemetery, April 6, 1922

Peary was promoted to the rank of captain in the Navy in October 1910. By his lobbying, Peary headed off a move among some U.S. Congressmen to have his claim to the pole evaluated by other explorers. Eventually recognized by Congress for "reaching" the pole, Peary was given the Thanks of Congress by a special act in March 1911. By the same Act of Congress, Peary was promoted to the rank of rear admiral in the Navy Civil Engineer Corps, retroactive to April 6, 1909. He retired from the Navy the same day, to Eagle Island on the coast of Maine, in the town of Harpswell. His home there has been designated a Maine State Historic Site.

After retiring, Peary received many honors from scientific societies for his Arctic explorations and discoveries. He served twice as president of the Explorers Club, from 1909 to 1911, and from 1913 to 1916.

In early 1916, Peary became chairman of the National Aerial Coast Patrol Commission, a private organization created by the Aero Club of America. It advocated the use of aircraft to detect warships and submarines off the U.S. coast. Peary used his celebrity to promote the use of military and naval aviation, which led directly to the formation of United States Navy Reserve aerial coastal patrol units during World War I. After the war, Peary proposed a system of eight airmail routes, which became the genesis of the U.S. Postal Service's airmail system.

In 1914, Peary bought the house at 1831 Wyoming Avenue NW in the Adams Morgan neighborhood of Washington, D.C., where he lived until his death on February 20, 1920. He began renovating the house in 1920, shortly before his death, after which the renovation was taken over by Josephine. She sold the house in 1927, receiving a $12,000 promissory note.

He was buried in Arlington National Cemetery. Matthew Henson was honored by being re-interred nearby on April 6, 1988.

== Marriage and family ==
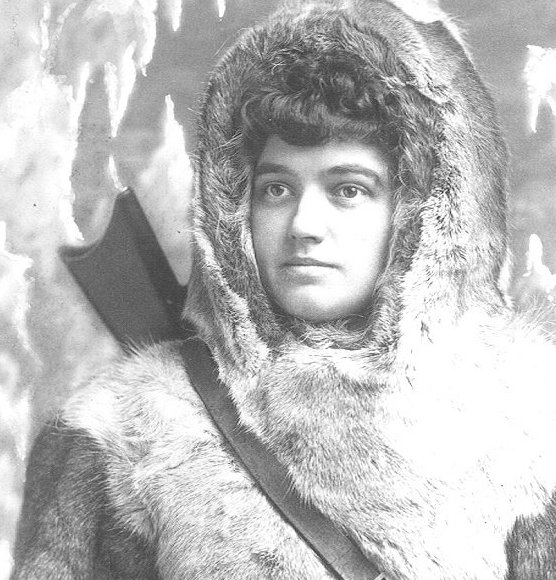
Josephine Diebitsch in 1892

On August 11, 1888, Peary married Josephine Diebitsch, a business school valedictorian who thought that women should be more than just mothers. Diebitsch had started working at the Smithsonian Institution when she was 19 or 20 years old, replacing her father after he became ill and filling his position as a linguist. In 1886, she resigned from the Smithsonian upon becoming engaged to Peary.

The newlyweds honeymooned in Atlantic City, New Jersey, then moved to Philadelphia, where Peary was assigned. Peary's mother accompanied them on their honeymoon, and she moved into their Philadelphia apartment, which caused friction between the two women. Josephine told Peary that his mother should return to live in Maine.

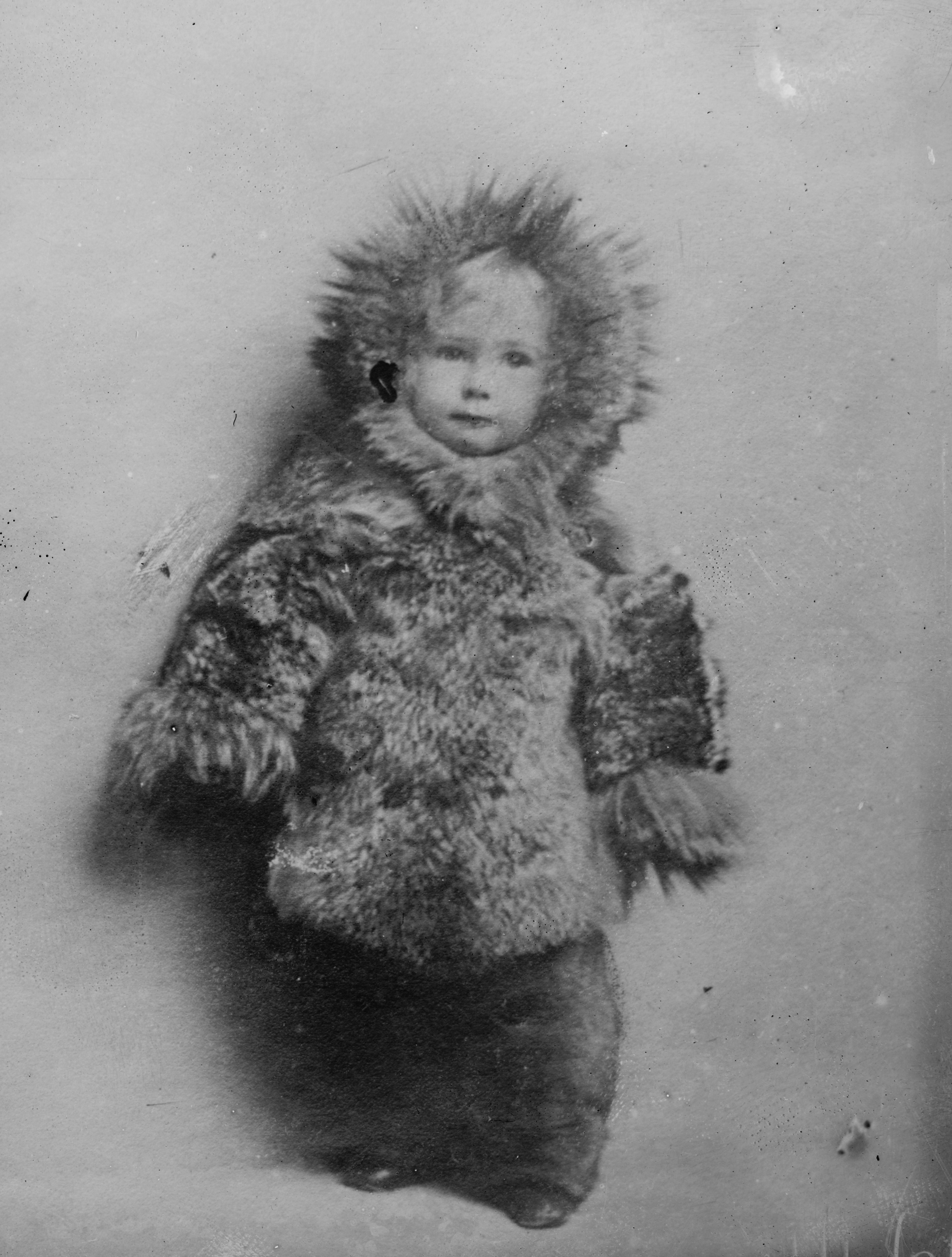
Peary's daughter, Marie Ahnighito Peary (born 1893)

They had three children together, Marie Ahnighito (1893–1978), Francine Peary (1899–1899) and Robert Peary Jr (1903–1994). His surviving daughter Marie wrote several books, including The Red Caboose (1932) a children's book about the Arctic adventures published by William Morrow and Company. As an explorer, Peary was frequently gone for years at a time. In their first 23 years of marriage, he spent only three with his wife and family.

Peary and his aide, Henson, both had relationships with Inuit women outside of marriage and fathered children with them. Peary appears to have started a relationship with Aleqasina (Alakahsingwah) when she was about 14 years old. They had at least two children, including a son called Kaala, Karree, or Kali. French explorer and ethnologist Jean Malaurie was the first to report on Peary's descendants after spending a year in Greenland in 1951–52.

S. Allen Counter, a Harvard neuroscience professor interested in Henson's role in the Arctic expeditions, went to Greenland in 1986. He found Peary's son Kali and Henson's son Anaukaq, then octogenarians, and some of their descendants. Counter arranged to bring the men and their families to the United States to meet their American relatives and see their fathers' gravesites. In 1991, Counter wrote about the episode in his book, North Pole Legacy: Black, White, and Eskimo (1991). He also gained national recognition of Henson's role in the expeditions. A documentary by the same name was also released. Wally Herbert also noted the relationship and children in his book The Noose of Laurels, published in 1989.

== Treatment of the Inuit ==
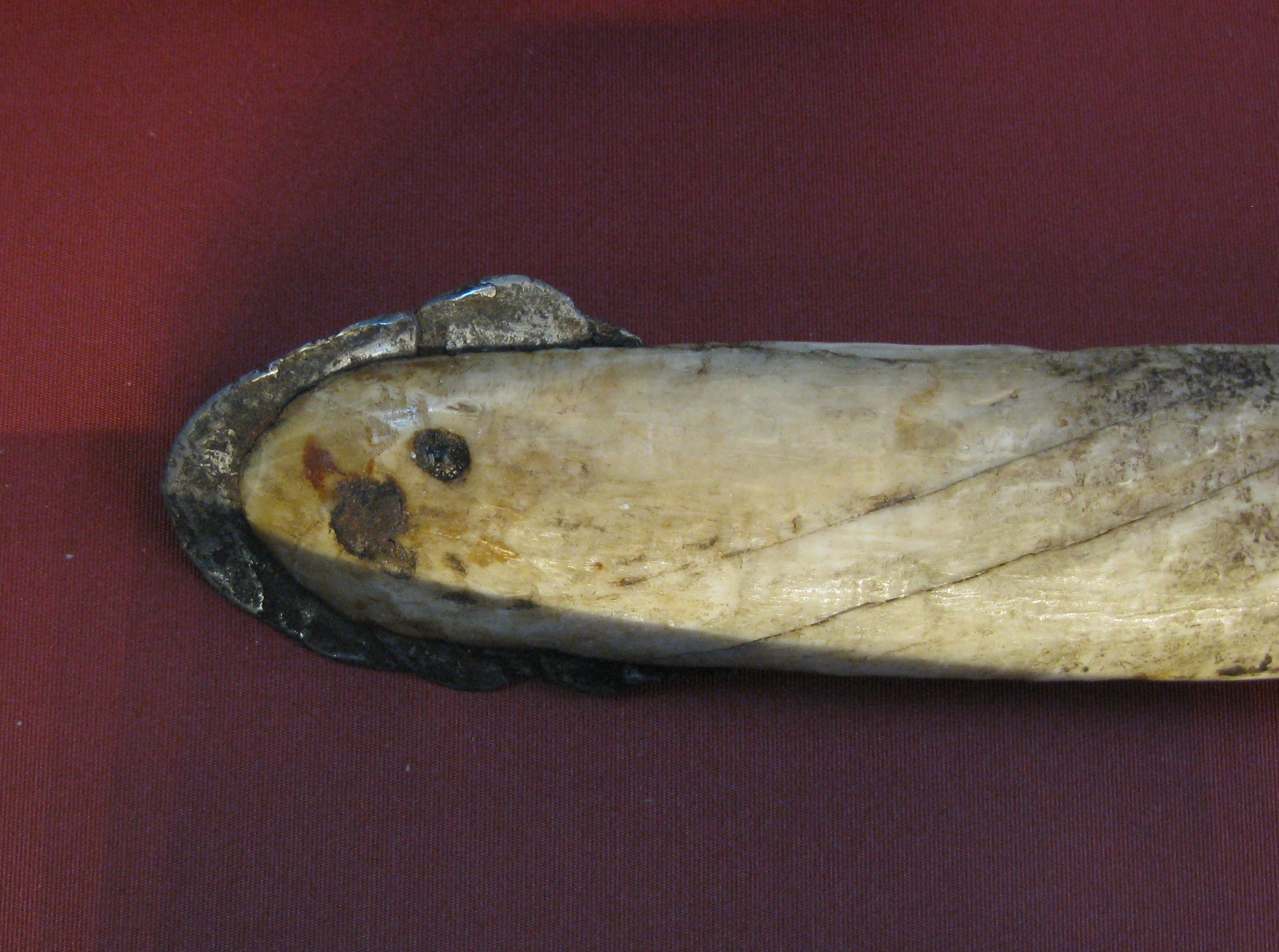
A narwhal tusk lance with an iron head made from the Cape York meteorite.

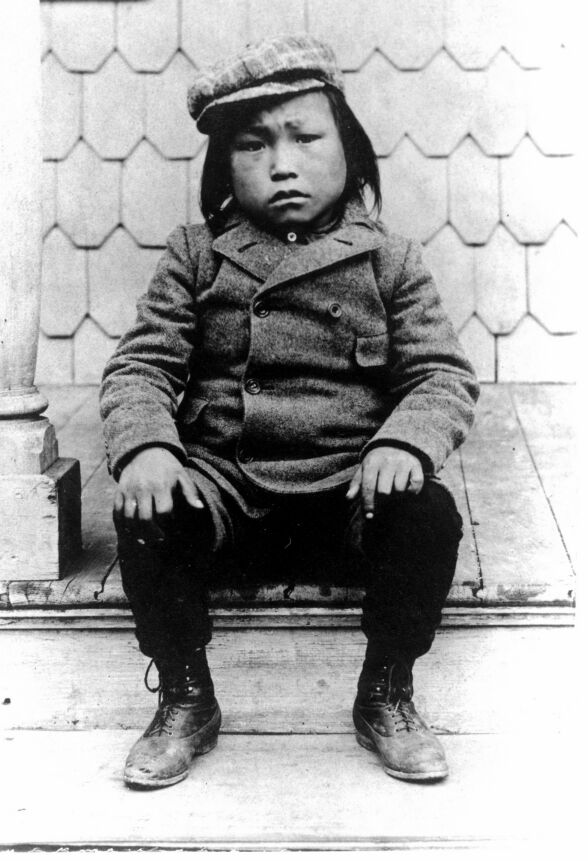
Minik, one of the Inuit whom Peary took back to America for study.

Peary has received criticism for his treatment of the Inuit, including fathering children with Aleqasina. Renée Hulan and Lyle Dick have both reported that Peary and his crew sexually exploited Inuit women on his 1908–1909 expedition. Peary has also been harshly criticized for bringing back a group of Inughuit Greenlandic Inuit to the United States along with the Cape York meteorite. The meteorite was of significant local economic importance: Although the Greenlanders had been obtaining the iron they needed from whalers, the Cape York meteorite was the only source of iron for tools. Peary sold it for $40,000 in 1897.

Working at the American Museum of Natural History, anthropologist Franz Boas had requested that Peary bring back an Inuk for study. During his expedition to retrieve the meteorite, Peary convinced six people, including a man named Qisuk and his child Minik, to travel to America with him by promising they would be able to return with tools, weapons and gifts within the year. Peary left the people at the museum when he returned with the meteorite in 1897, where they were kept in damp, humid conditions unlike their homeland. Within a few months, four died of tuberculosis; their remains were dissected and the bones of Qisuk were put on display after Minik was shown a fake burial.

Speaking as a teenager to the San Francisco Examiner about Peary, Minik said:

At the start, Peary was kind enough to my people. He made them presents of ornaments, a few knives and guns for hunting and wood to build sledges. But as soon as he was ready to start home his other work began. Before our eyes he packed up the bones of our dead friends and ancestors. To the women’s crying and the men’s questioning he answered that he was taking our dead friends to a warm and pleasant land to bury them. Our sole supply of flint for lighting and iron for hunting and cooking implements was furnished by a huge meteorite. This Peary put aboard his steamer and took from my poor people, who needed it so much. After this he coaxed my father and that brave man Natooka, who were the strongest hunters and the wisest heads for our tribe, to go with him to America. Our people were afraid to let them go, but Peary promised them that they should have Natooka and my father back within a year, and that with them would come a great stock of guns and ammunition, and wood and metal and presents for the women and children … We were crowded into the hold of the vessel and treated like dogs. Peary seldom came near us.

Peary eventually helped Minik travel home in 1909, though it is speculated that this was to avoid any bad press surrounding his anticipated celebratory return after reaching the North Pole. In 1986, Kenn Harper wrote a book about Minik, entitled Give Me My Father's Body. Convinced that the remains of Qisuk and the three adult Inuit should be returned to Greenland, he tried to persuade the Museum of Natural History to do this, as well as working through the "red tape" of the US and Canadian governments. In 1993, Harper succeeded in having the Inuit remains returned. In Qaanaaq, he witnessed the Inuit funeral ceremony for the remains of Qisuk and the three tribesmen [Shaman Atangana (ca. 1840–1898) with her husband, renowned hunter Nuktaq (ca. 1848–1898), and their adoptive daughter Aviaq (ca. 1885–1898)] that had been taken to New York.

Peary had employed the Inughuit in his expeditions for more than a decade, paying them in firearms, ammunition and other Western goods on which they had come to rely, and leaving them in a dire situation in 1909. The demands of the American expeditions had also resulted in the caribou of North Greenland being hunted to near extinction.

== Controversy surrounding North Pole claim ==
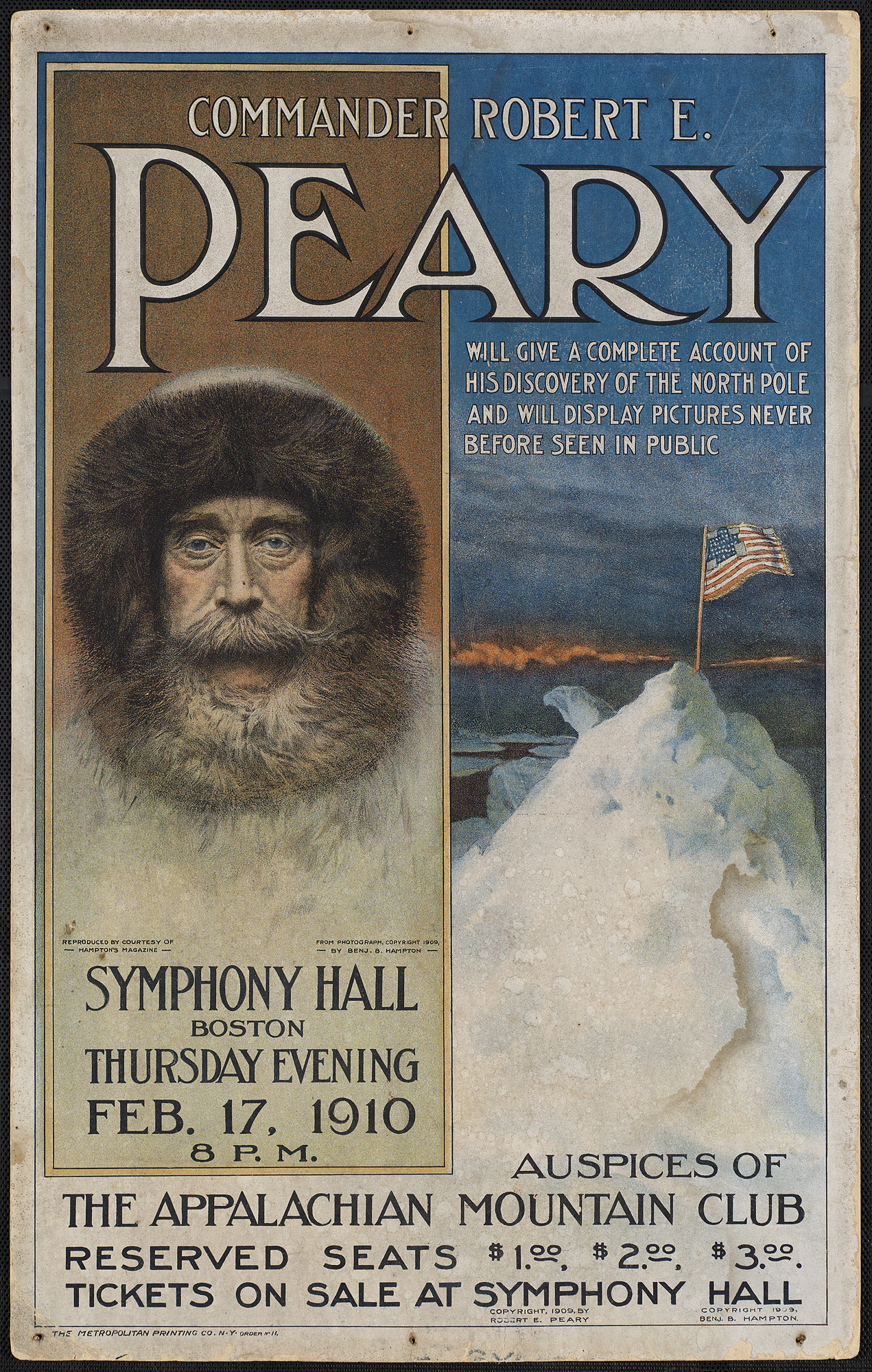
Commander Robert E. Peary speaks at the Appalachian Mountain Club in February 1910

Peary's claim to have reached the North Pole has long been subject to doubt. Some polar historians believe that Peary honestly thought he had reached the pole. Others have suggested that he was guilty of deliberately exaggerating his accomplishments. Peary's account has been newly criticized by Pierre Berton (2001) and Bruce Henderson (2005).

=== Lack of independent validation ===
Peary did not submit his evidence for review to neutral national or international parties or to other explorers. Peary's claim was certified by the National Geographic Society (NGS) in 1909 after a cursory examination of Peary's records, as NGS was a major sponsor of his expedition. This was a few weeks before Cook's Pole claim was rejected by a Danish panel of explorers and navigational experts.

The National Geographic Society limited access to Peary's records. At the time, his proofs were not made available for scrutiny by other professionals, as had been done by the Danish panel. Gilbert Hovey Grosvenor persuaded the United States National Academy of Sciences not to get involved. The Royal Geographical Society (RGS) of London gave Peary a one-off medal (created by sculptor Kathleen Scott, later widow of Robert Falcon Scott), in 1910, despite internal council splits that became known only in the 1970s. The RGS based their decision on the belief that the NGS had performed a serious scrutiny of the "proofs", which was not the case. Neither the American Geographical Society nor any of the geographical societies of semi-Arctic Scandinavia has recognized Peary's North Pole claim.

=== Criticisms ===
==== Omissions in navigational documentation ====
The party that accompanied Peary on the final stage of the journey did not include anyone trained in navigation who could either confirm or contradict Peary's own navigational work. This was further exacerbated by Peary's failure to produce records of observed data for steering, for the direction ("variation") of the compass, for his longitudinal position at any time, or for zeroing-in on the pole either latitudinally or transversely beyond Bartlett Camp.

==== Inconsistent speeds ====
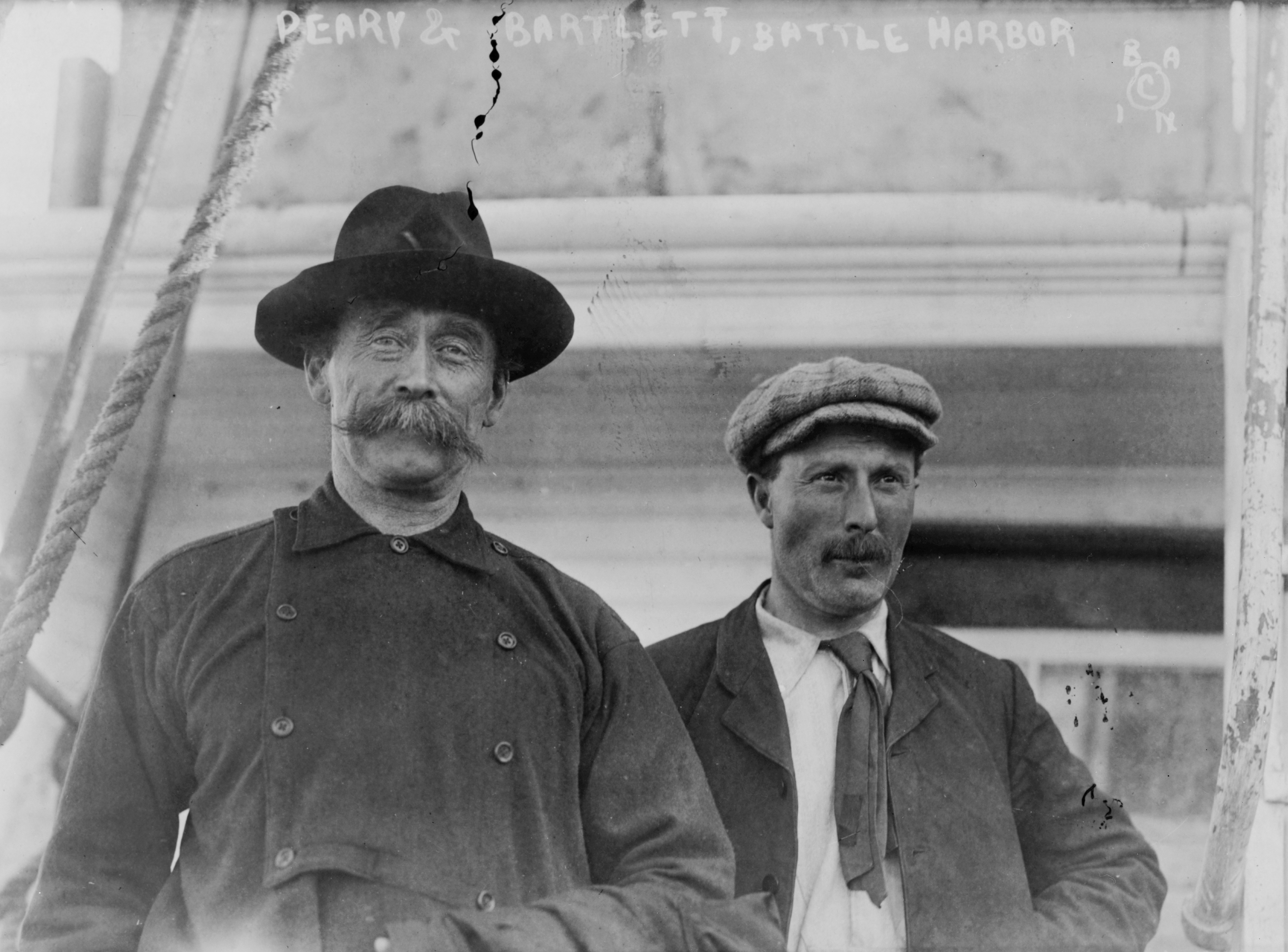
Peary and Robert Bartlett at Battle Harbour in 1909

The last five marches when Peary was accompanied by a navigator (Capt. Bob Bartlett) averaged no better than 13 mi (21 km) marching north. But once the last support party turned back at "Camp Bartlett", where Bartlett was ordered southward, at least 133 nmi (246 km; 153 mi) from the pole, Peary's claimed speeds immediately doubled for the five marches to Camp Jesup. The recorded speeds quadrupled during the two and a half-day return to Camp Bartlett – at which point his speed slowed drastically. Peary's account of a beeline journey to the pole and back—which would have assisted his claim of such speed—is contradicted by his companion Henson's account of tortured detours to avoid "pressure ridges" (ice floes' rough edges, often a few meters high) and "leads" (open water between those floes).

In his official report, Peary claimed to have traveled a total of 304 nautical miles between April 2, 1909, (when he left Bartlett's last camp) and April 9 (when he returned there), 133 nmi (246 km; 153 mi) to the pole, the same distance back, and 38 nmi (70 km; 44 mi) in the vicinity of the pole. These distances are counted without detours due to drift, leads and difficult ice, i.e. the distance traveled must have been significantly higher to make good the distance claimed. Peary and his party arrived back in Cape Columbia on the morning of April 23, 1909, only about two and a half days after Capt Bartlett, yet Peary claimed he had traveled a minimum of 304 nmi (563 km; 350 mi) more than Bartlett (to the Pole and vicinity).

The conflicting and unverified claims of Cook and Peary prompted Roald Amundsen to take extensive precautions in navigation during Amundsen's South Pole expedition so as to leave no room for doubt concerning his 1911 attainment of the South Pole, which—like Robert Falcon Scott's a month later in 1912—was supported by the sextant, theodolite, and compass observations of several other navigators.

==== Review of Peary's diary ====
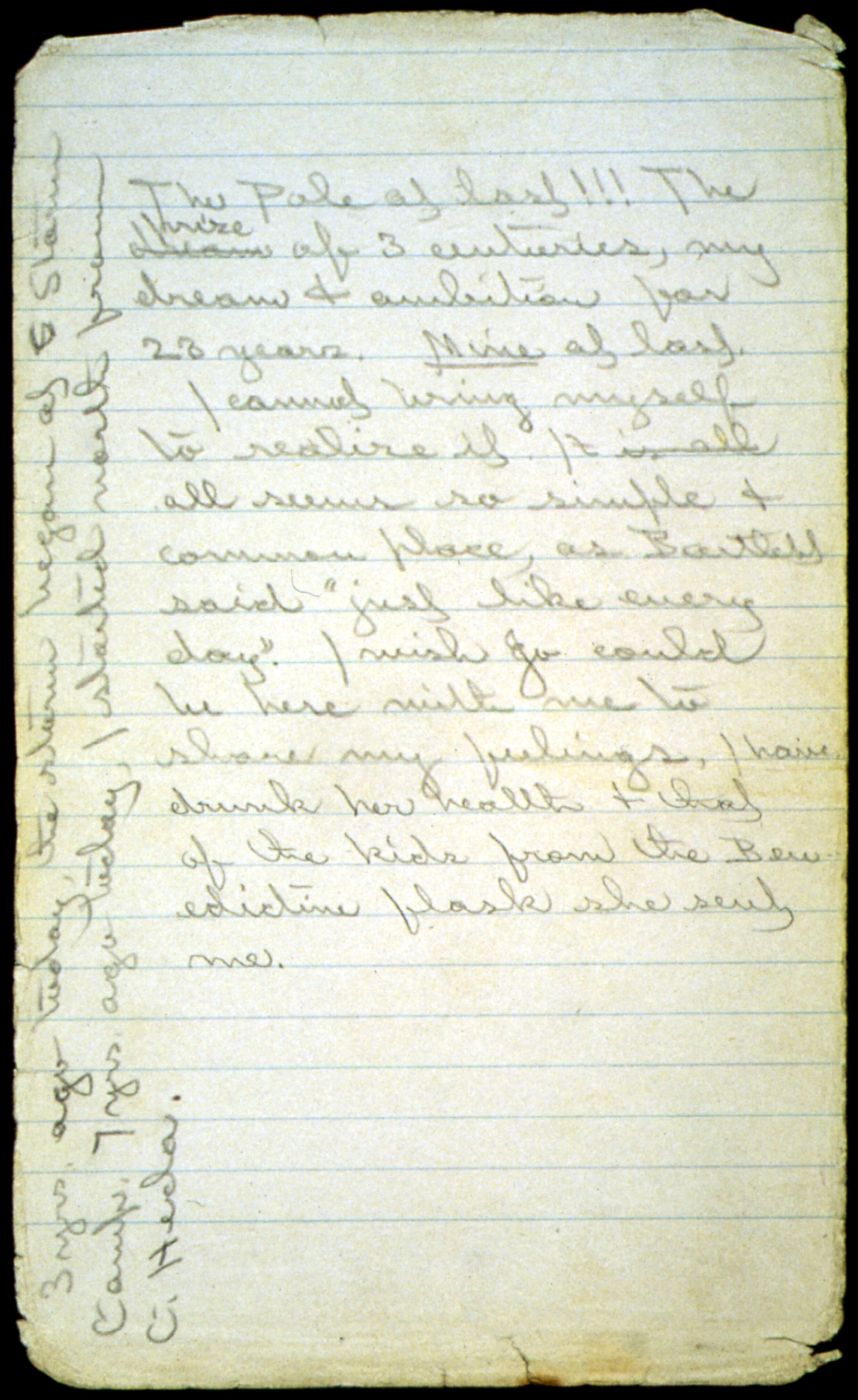
Peary's diary entry for arrival at the North Pole

The diary that Robert E. Peary kept on his 1909 polar expedition was finally made available for research in 1986. Historian Larry Schweikart examined it, finding that: the writing was consistent throughout (giving no evidence of post-expedition alteration), there were consistent pemmican and other stains on all pages, and all evidence was consistent with a conclusion that Peary's observations were made on the spot he claimed. Schweikart compared the reports and experiences of Japanese explorer Naomi Uemura, who reached the North Pole alone in 1978, to those of Peary and found they were consistent. However, Peary made no entries in the diary on the crucial days of April 6 and 7, 1909, and his famous words "The Pole at Last!", allegedly written in his diary at the pole, were written on loose slips of paper that were inserted into the diary.

==== 1984 and 1989 National Geographic Society studies ====
In 1984, the National Geographic Society (NGS), a major sponsor of Peary's expeditions, commissioned Wally Herbert, an Arctic explorer himself, to write an assessment of Peary's original 1909 diary and astronomical observations. As Herbert researched the material, he came to believe that Peary falsified his records and concluded that he did not reach the North Pole. His book, The Noose of Laurels, caused a furor when it was published in 1989. If Peary did not reach the pole in 1909, Herbert would claim the record of being the first to reach the pole on foot.

In 1989, the NGS also conducted a two-dimensional photogrammetric analysis of the shadows in photographs and a review of ocean depth measures taken by Peary; its staff concluded that he was no more than 5 mi (8 km) away from the pole. Peary's original camera, a 1908 #4 Folding Pocket Kodak, did not survive. As such cameras were made with at least six different lenses from various manufacturers, the focal length of the lens, and hence the shadow analysis based on it, must be considered uncertain at best. The NGS has never released Peary's photos for an independent analysis. Specialists questioned the conclusions of the NGS. The NGS commissioned the Foundation for the Promotion of the Art of Navigation to resolve the issue, which concluded that Peary had indeed reached the North Pole.

==== Review of depth soundings ====
Supporters of Peary and Henson assert that the depth soundings they made on the outward journey have been matched by recent surveys, and so their claim of having reached the Pole is confirmed. Since only the first few of the Peary party's soundings, taken nearest the shore, touched bottom; experts have said their usefulness is limited to showing that he was above deep water. Peary's expedition possessed 4,000 fathoms of sounding line, but he took only 2,000 with him over an ocean already established as being deeper in many regions. Peary stated in 1909 Congressional hearings about the expedition that he made no longitudinal observations during his trip, only latitude observations, yet he maintained he stayed on the "Columbia meridian" all along, and that his soundings were made on this meridian. The pack ice was moving all the time, so he had no way of knowing where he was without longitudinal observations.

=== Re-creation of expedition in 2005 ===
In 2005, British explorer Tom Avery and four companions re-created the outward portion of Peary's journey using replica wooden sleds and Canadian Eskimo Dog teams. They ensured their sled weights were the same as Peary's sleds throughout their journey. They reached the North Pole in 36 days, 22 hours—nearly five hours faster than Peary. However, Avery's fastest 5-day march was 90 nautical miles (170 km), significantly short of the 135 nautical miles (250 km) claimed by Peary.

After reaching the Pole, Avery and his team were airlifted off the ice rather than returning by dogsled.

== Legacy ==
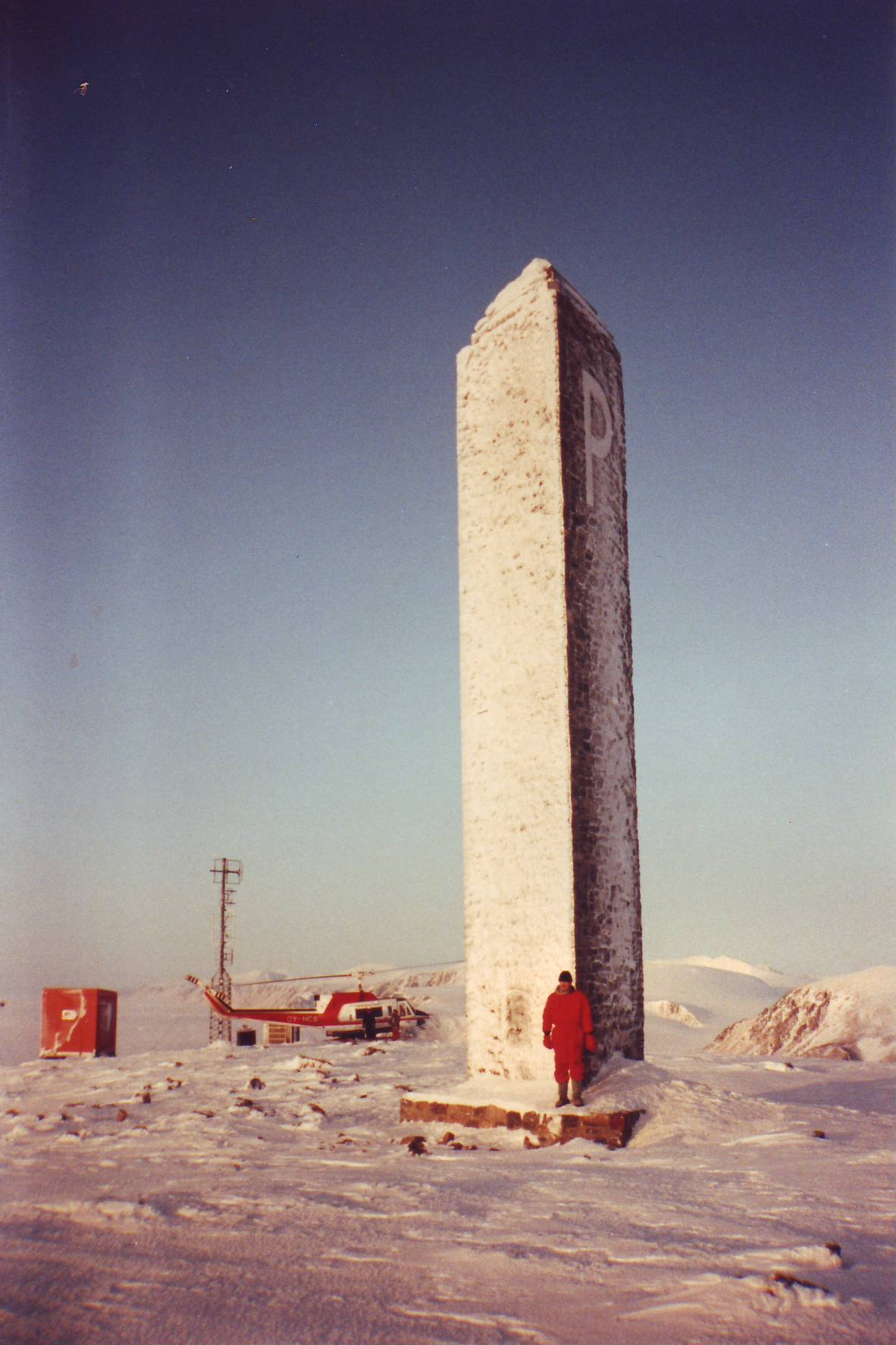
Peary monument at Cape York, northwest Greenland

Several United States Navy ships have been named USS Robert E. Peary. The Peary–MacMillan Arctic Museum at Bowdoin College is named for Peary and fellow Arctic explorer Donald Baxter MacMillan. Robert E. Peary Middle School in Gardena, CA, and Robert E. Peary High School in Rockvile, MD, were named after him. In 1986, the United States Postal Service issued a 22-cent postage stamp in honor of Peary and Henson;

Peary Land, Peary Glacier, Peary Nunatak and Cape Peary in Greenland, Peary Bay and Peary Channel in Canada, as well as Mount Peary in Antarctica, are named in his honor. The lunar crater Peary, located at the Moon's north pole, is also named after him.

Camp Peary in York County, Virginia is named for Admiral Peary. Originally established as a Navy Seabee training center during World War II, it was repurposed in the 1950s as a Central Intelligence Agency training facility. It is commonly called "The Farm".

Admiral Peary Vocational Technical School, located in a neighboring community very close to his birthplace of Cresson, PA, was named for him and was opened in 1972. Today the school educates over 600 students each year in numerous technical education disciplines.

A section of U.S. Route 22 in Cambria County, Pennsylvania, is named the Admiral Peary Highway

Major General Adolphus Greely, leader of the ill-fated Lady Franklin Bay Expedition from 1881 to 1884, noted that no Arctic expert questioned that Peary courageously risked his life traveling hundreds of miles from land, and that he reached regions adjacent to the pole. After initial acceptance of Peary's claim, he later came to doubt Peary's having reached 90°.

In his book Ninety Degrees North, polar historian Fergus Fleming describes Peary as "undoubtedly the most driven, possibly the most successful and probably the most unpleasant man in the annals of polar exploration".

In 1932, an expedition was made by Robert Bartlett and Marie Ahnighito Peary Stafford, Peary's daughter, on the Effie M. Morrissey to erect a monument to Peary at Cape York, Greenland.

== Recognition and honors ==
=== Medals ===
- American Geographical Society, Cullum Geographical Medal (1896)
- American Geographical Society, Charles P. Daly Medal (1902)
- National Geographic Society, Hubbard Medal (1906)
- Royal Geographical Society of London, special great gold medal
- National Geographic Society of Washington, the special great gold medal
- Geographical Society of Philadelphia, great gold medal
- Chicago Geographical Society, Helen Culver medal
- Imperial German Geographical Society, Nachtigal Medal
- Royal Italian Geographical Society, King Humbert gold medal
- Imperial Austrian Geographical Society
- Hungarian Geographical Society gold medal
- Royal Belgian Geographical Society gold medal
- Royal Geographical Society of Antwerp gold medal
- Spanish Campaign Medal

=== Honorary degrees ===
- Bowdoin College – Doctor of laws
- Edinburgh University – Doctor of laws

=== Honorary memberships ===
- New York Chamber of Commerce honorary member.
- Pennsylvania Society Honorary member
- Manchester Geographical Society Honorary membership
- Royal Netherlands Geographical Society of Amsterdam Honorary membership

=== Other recognition ===
- Royal Scottish Geographical Society, special trophy, a replica in silver of the ships used by Hudson, Baffin, and Davis.
- Grand Officer of the Legion of Honor, awarded 1913
- In Arlington National Cemetery on April 6, 1922, the Admiral Robert Edwin Peary monument was unveiled by his daughter, Mrs. Marie Peary Stafford. Numerous government officials, including President Harding and Former United States Secretary of the Navy Edwin Denby were in attendance.
- On May 28, 1986, the United States Postal Service issued a 22 cent postage stamp in his and Matthew Henson's honor.

== Popular culture ==
Neil Munro gives a satirical account of the rival claims of Peary and Cook in his Erchie Macpherson story "Erchie Explains the Polar Situation", first published in the Glasgow Evening News of 4 October 1909.

E. L. Doctorow recounts Peary’s expedition in his novel Ragtime (1975).
