= Miriam MacMillan =

American sailor and photographer (1905–1987)

Miriam Norton Look MacMillan
- Born: June 13, 1905
- Died: August 18, 1987 (aged 82)
- Partner: Donald Baxter MacMillan

Miriam Norton Look MacMillan (née Look; June 13, 1905 – August 18, 1987) was an American sailor, writer, lecturer, photographer, and explorer.

From 1937 onward she was a chief photographer in nine Arctic expeditions on the Bowdoin schooner to Labrador, Baffin Island, and West Greenland within 660 miles of the North Pole.

In 1948 she detailed her 1937–1939 expeditions in her adventure memoirs, Green Seas and White Ice.

Throughout her expeditions, MacMillan created thousands of photographs, audio recordings of Inuktitut songs, and films of Umiak sailors. She later organized these and Inuit art to curate the Peary-MacMillan Arctic Museum.

== Biography ==
=== Early life ===
On June 13, 1905, Miriam Norton Look was born in Clinton, Massachusetts. Her parents were Amy G. Wood Look and Moses Jerome Look, a civil engineer who built dams. Her grandfather was a sea captain.

As a child, her parents were often visited by their friend Donald MacMillan, whom she called "Uncle Dan." Donald MacMillan would visit her family between Arctic expeditions, bringing Miriam Norton Look a gift of "a beaded craft, an ivory figurine, or some other token of his adventures in the North." They corresponded via letters.

Look's father, a hobbyist sailor, owned a 25-foot motorboat, the Sea Dog. As a teenager, he gifted Look her own boat. Look writes, "A smaller and much slower [25-foot] motorboat which he bought for me I promptly christened the Sea Pup, and the rowboat which tagged on behind, the Poodle." As a teenager, she sailed her boat the Sea Pup throughout the islands of Maine.

While sailing the Sea Pup, she once recognized Donald MacMillan's 88-foot Bowdoin schooner, which had dropped anchor near Bustins Island. She piloted the boat and asked MacMillan if he needed a ride; he accepted her offer, as he stated he had a dinner date that evening. However, the boat ran out of gas minutes later, and Donald MacMillan was a half-hour late to his dinner date. Nevertheless, Donald MacMillan was purportedly impressed with Look's "expert control" of the motorboat.

On March 18, 1935, at the age of 29, Miriam Norton Look married Donald Baxter MacMillan; he was 61 years old.

=== Expeditions ===
In 1937, MacMillan decided she wanted to travel to the Inuit town of Nunainguk, Newfoundland and Labrador with her husband. He agreed on the stipulation that MacMillan should arrive in nearby Hopedale without his assistance. MacMillan agreed and decided to race him to the destination. While her husband sailed, MacMillan traveled by train and mail carrier, reaching Hopedale days before her husband. Before his arrival, she studied Inuktitut, crafted Inuit clothing, and asked local Inuit to tell her stories about Donald MacMillan. When MacMillan arrived, he mistook Miriam MacMillan and her friend for Inuit women.

She was a photographer and audio recorder on nine of Donald MacMillan's Arctic expeditions on the Bowdoin schooner to Labrador, Baffin Island, and West Greenland.

In 1939 she took a portrait photograph of her husband on the Bowdoin, in his Captain's hat, holding a puppy named Kahda.

A 1947 photograph displays MacMillan on the Bowdoin schooner using wire recording to document Inuktitut languages.

A 1948 photograph in Northwest Greenland shows MacMillan at the wheel of the Bowdoin schooner, beside her camera tripod.

On June 13, 1954, MacMillan and her husband were featured in a front-page rotogravure photograph on the Boston Sunday Herald.

=== Later life and death ===
In 1967, she became an honorary curator of the Peary-MacMillan Arctic Museum.

Circa 1970 to 1980, she collected and catalogued the thousands of photographs, slides, and Inuit art she had collected, which included wire recordings of Inuktitut language and songs. These are housed in the library of Bowdoin College. She also was central in the restoration of the Bowdoin schooner.

In 1980, MacMillan received the honorary Doctor of Science degree from Bowdoin College. The following year, she became a member of The Explorers Club.

On August 18, 1987, Miriam died and was buried in Provincetown, Massachusetts.

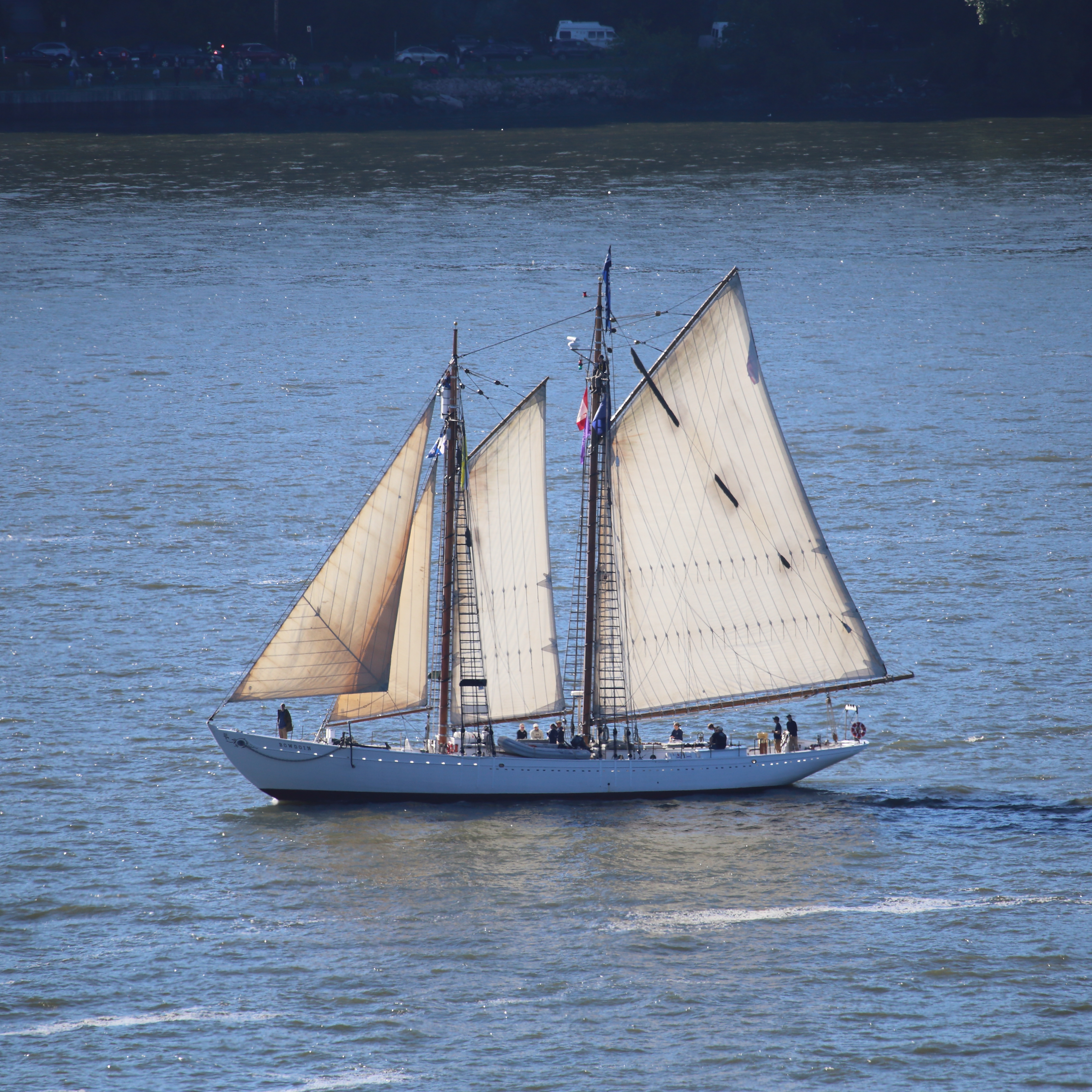
MacMillan travelled on nine Arctic voyages in the Bowdoin schooner, and later worked towards its restoration

== Legacy ==
Samuel Edmund Oppenheim (1901–1992) painted a portrait of MacMillan; sources do not indicate the year of the painting.

In 2010, MacMillan was added to the Brunswick Women's History Walking Trail alongside Congregationalist freewoman Phebe Ann Jacobs, milliner Dolly Giddings, botanist and artist Catherine Furbish, St. John's teacher Sister Pauline Langelier, restaurateur Pauline Siatras, and famed author Harriet Beecher Stowe.

== Novels ==
- Green Seas and White Ice (1948), historical account of her travels
- Etuk, the Eskimo Hunter (1950), children's fiction book inspired by Inuit culture
- Kudla and His Polar Bear (1953), children's fiction book inspired by Inuit culture
