= Ladona (schooner) =

American yacht

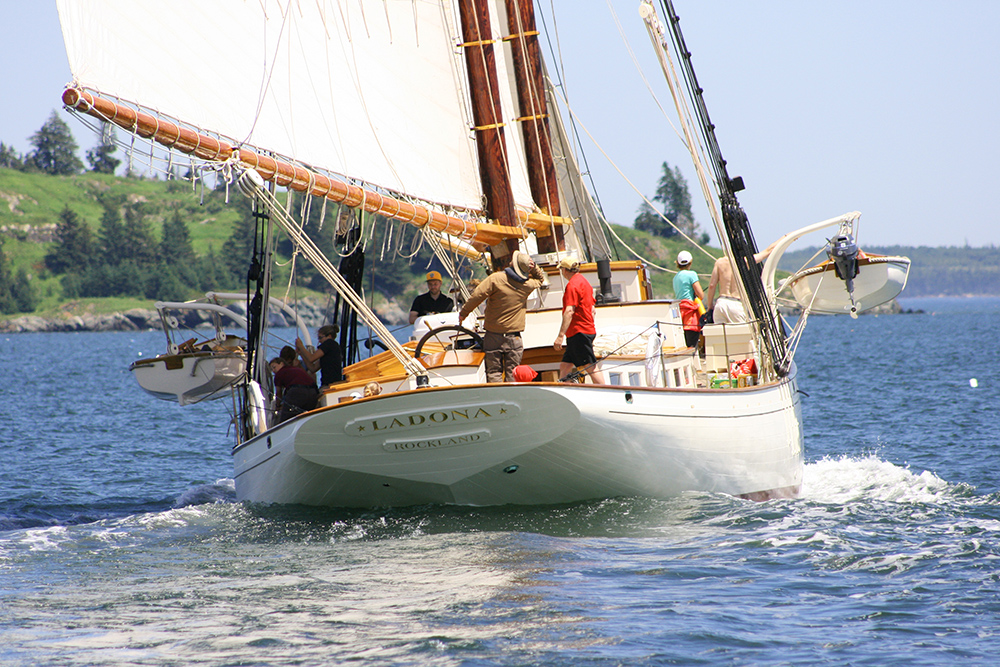

History

United States
- Builder: Hodgdon Brothers
- Completed: 1922
- In service: 20 September 1945
- Out of service: 5 January 1946
- Home port: Rockland, Maine

General characteristics
- Class & type: auxiliary schooner
- Length: 81 feet
- Beam: 21 feet
- Draught: 11 feet

The Ladona is a two-masted, wooden-hulled Schooner was designed by William H. Hand Jr. and built in 1922 as a private yacht and launched in Boothbay Harbor, Maine, USA. Its home port is Rockland, Maine and it is part of the Maine Windjammer Association fleet, which offers sailing cruises booked by cabin berths.

== History ==
Ladona was commissioned by Homer Loring in 1922 and launched out of Hodgdon Yachts in East Boothbay Harbor, Maine. It is a sister ship to the Bowdoin that sailed the Arctic region.

In 1923, Ladona won first place in the special Schooner class of the Bermuda Cup race, sailing under the flag of the Eastern Yacht Club.

Owned during the 1930s by noted sailor Hobart Ford, the schooner was named the Jane Doré and was seen in the New York waters. The Coast Guard acquired her from Hobart Ford in 1942, and the schooner served as a coast guard patrol boat with the designation CG-81006 and used her on offshore patrol duty in the 3rd Naval District from 2 November 1942 to 30 October 1945.

Later renamed USS Canandaigua (IX-233), an unclassified miscellaneous vessel, it was the third ship of the United States Navy to be named for Canandaigua, New York. A Chief of Naval Operations (CNO) dispatch of 20 September 1945 authorized the Commander of the 3rd Naval District to accept CG-81006 from the Coast Guard for permanent transfer to the Navy. A CNO letter of 9 October 45, approved by the Secretary of the Navy on 15 October 1945, changed the classification of CG-81006 to IX-233 and named her Canandaigua. She was transferred by the Coast Guard on 30 October 1945, was placed in service the next day, and assigned to the Underwater Sound Laboratory at New London, Connecticut. She foundered there on 22 November 1945 due to hull damage inflicted alongside her pier during a nor'easter gale and was considered a total loss. She was raised and placed out of service in January 1946 and sold on 31 October 1946.

In 1960 the boat was owned by Theophilus A. Silva and served as a fishing vessel out of Stonington, Connecticut bearing the name Joseph W. Hawkins.

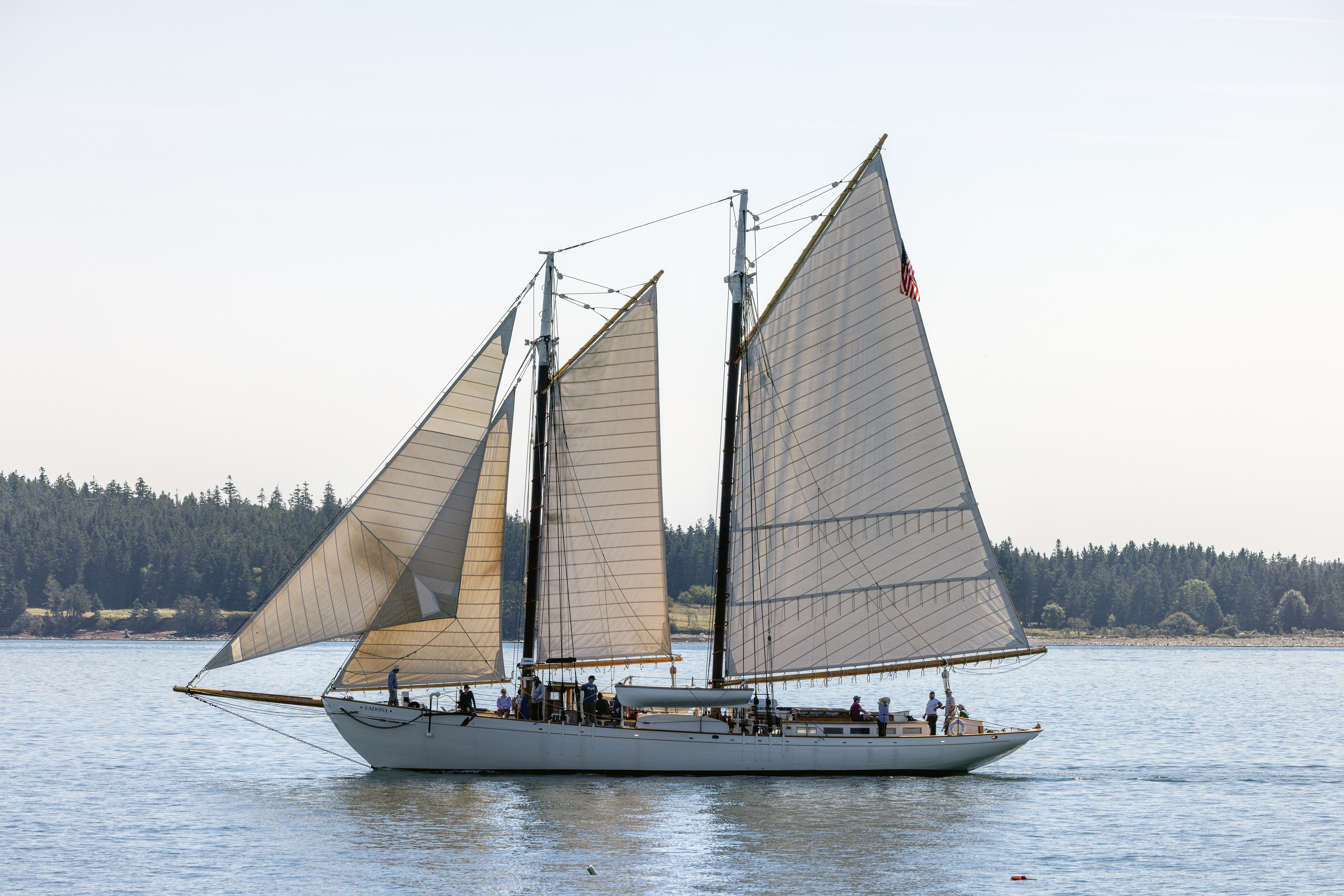
Schooner Ladona (Ship, 1922) in Maine

Ownership transferred to Skip Hawkins around 1972 and to Gib Philbrick in 1999. The schooner underwent a refit to become a training ship, renamed Nathaniel Bowditch . Nathaniel Bowditch sailed to Newport and then to Baiona, Spain. In 1973 the skippers Roger Brainerd and Carl Chase converted the Nathaniel Bowditch into a floating classroom for students. It joined the Maine Windjammer Association fleet. With nine cabins, it accommodates 17 passengers for 3- to 7-night cruises along the Maine coast from June to October.

The original name Ladona was restored in 2014 when the ship was extensively rebuilt by its co-owners Noah and Jane Barnes and current skipper J. R. Braugh. It joined the Maine windjammers fleet in 2016 and celebrated its centennial in its port of origin.

== Awards ==
- American Campaign Medal
- World War II Victory Medal

== Links ==
- Ladona website
