= Effie M. Morrissey =

Museum ship in Massachusetts

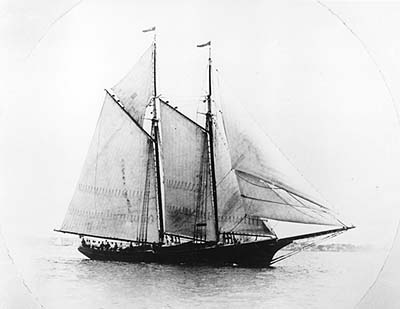
- Effie M. Morrissey in 1894

History

United States
- Name: Effie M. Morrissey
- Builder: John F. James & Washington Tarr, Essex, Massachusetts
- Launched: 1 February 1894
- Renamed: Ernestina
- Status: Training vessel

General characteristics
- Type: Two-masted Gaff rigged schooner
- Tonnage: 120 GRT
- Length: 152 ft (46.3 m) LOA; 112 ft (34.1 m) WLL
- Beam: 24 ft 5 in (7.4 m)
- Draft: 13 ft (4.0 m)
- Propulsion: Sails and diesel engine
- Sail plan: 8,000 sq ft (740 m^{2})
- Ernestina (schooner)
- U.S. National Register of Historic Places
- U.S. National Historic Landmark
- Location within Massachusetts Location within the United States
- Location: Steamship Wharf, New Bedford, Massachusetts
- Coordinates: 41°38′2.42″N 70°55′14.22″W
- Built: 1894
- Architect: George Melville McClain; James & Tarr Shipyards
- NRHP reference No.: 85000022

Significant dates
- Added to NRHP: January 3, 1985
- Designated NHL: December 14, 1990

Effie M. Morrissey (now Ernestina-Morrissey) is a historic schooner on permanent display in New Bedford, Massachusetts. Originally a "high liner" fishing the Grand Banks of Newfoundland out of Gloucester, Massachusetts, she made many scientific expeditions to the Arctic, sponsored by American museums, the Explorers Club and the National Geographic Society; she also helped survey the Arctic for the United States Government during World War II. She then went on to a final career as a packet ship, before undergoing a complete restoration in 1982.

She is currently designated by the United States Department of the Interior as a National Historic Landmark as part of the New Bedford Whaling National Historical Park. She is the state Ship of Massachusetts.

== History ==
Designed by George McClain of Gloucester, Massachusetts to withstand North Atlantic gales, Effie M. Morrissey was the last fishing schooner built for the Wonson Fish Company. Laid down with white oak and yellow pine at the John F. James & Washington Tarr shipyard in Essex, Massachusetts, she took four months to build and was launched 1 February 1894. Her hull was painted black and her first skipper was William Edward Morrissey, who named her after his daughter Effie.

=== Grand Banks Fishing Schooner ===
Effie M. Morrissey fished out of Gloucester for eleven years. Considered a high liner, she brought in enough fish - over 200,000 pounds (91,000 kg) - on her first voyage to pay for her construction. One of Effie M. Morrissey's more notable skippers was Clayton Morrissey, who went on to skipper the racing schooner Henry Ford. A statue to Morrissey by sculptor Leonard Craske named the Gloucester Fisherman's Memorial can be seen on Gloucester's Western Avenue.

In 1905 under a new owner, Captain Ansel Snow, Effie M. Morrissey began fishing out of Digby, Nova Scotia. In 1912, the Montreal journalist and photographer Frederick William Wallace sailed on the vessel as a member of Snow's crew. His epic poem about his time aboard Effie M. Morrissey, "The Log of the Record Run," was widely read and adopted by east coast fishermen with such authentic results that the folklorist Helen Creighton mistakenly believed it to be a very old traditional song.

In 1914 ownership moved to Brigus, Newfoundland, where Harold Bartlett used her as a fishing and coasting vessel along the Newfoundland and Labrador shoreline.

=== Early 20th century: exploration ===
In 1925 Harold Bartlett sold her to his cousin, noted Arctic explorer Capt. Bob Bartlett, who installed an auxiliary engine and reinforced the hull so the vessel could be used in Arctic ice. In 1926 with the financial support of the well known publisher George Palmer Putnam, Bartlett embarked on two decades of Arctic exploration using this vessel.

Notable voyages captained by Robert Bartlett aboard Effie M. Morrissey include:

1. 1926 Greenland Expedition to Northwest Greenland for the American Museum of National History with George Palmer Putnam and University of Michigan Professor William H. Hobbs.
2. 1927 Voyage to Western Baffin Land for the American Geographical Society, Museum of the American Indian and the Heye Foundation with George Palmer Putman and Robert E. Peary Jr. (son of Robert E. Peary).
3. 1928 Stoll McCracken Siberian Arctic Expedition to the Aleutian Islands, Bering Strait, and Arctic for the American Museum of Natural History with Charles H. Stoll and Harold McCracken.
4. 1929 Labrador Motion Picture Expedition along the Labrador Coast with Maurice Kellerman.
5. 1930 North East Greenland Expedition for the Museum of the American Indian.
6. 1931 Norcross-Bartlett Expedition to Northeast Greenland for the Smithsonian Institution, Heye Foundation, American Museum of Natural History, and the New York Botanical Garden to gather flowering plants for Botanical Gardens; specimens of wild fowl for the Museum of Natural History and narwhal and seals for the Ocean Hall of Life. In addition to this they carried out oceanographic, hydrographic and meteorological work for the US Navy, Smithsonian Institution, and others.
7. 1932 Peary Memorial Expedition as a monument to Robert E. Peary, co-chartered by Peary's daughter Marie Ahnighito Peary Stafford and Arthur D. Norcross. Peary's grandchildren, Edward and Peary Stafford, accompanied their mother.
8. 1933 Bartlett Northwest Greenland Expedition through the Hudson Strait, Fury Strait and the Hecla Strait for the American Museum of Natural History, Museum of American Indian, American Geographical Society and the navy Department.
9. 1934 Expedition to Greenland and Ellesmere Land making scientific collections for the Philadelphia Academy of Natural Sciences.
10. 1935 Northwest Greenland Expedition for Field Museum and the Smithsonian Institution. On this expedition was Dr. Lamar Soutter, founding dean of the University of Massachusetts Medical School.
11. 1936 Bartlett Northeast Greenland Expedition for the Smithsonian Institution, American Geographical Society, Chicago Zoological Society and the Field Museum.
12. 1937 Bartlett Northwest Greenland Expedition for the Smithsonian Institution and the Chicago Zoological Society.
13. 1938 Northwest Greenland Expedition for the Smithsonian Institution, Cleveland Museum of Natural History, and the United States National Museum.
14. 1939 Northeast Greenland Expedition for the New York Zoological Society and the Smithsonian Institution.
15. 1940 Greenland Expedition where Effie M. Morrissey set a record for furthest north at 80 degrees 22 minutes North Latitude, a mere 578 nautical miles (1,070 km) from the North Pole. Pathe Newsreels had filmed this incredible effort, among those in attendance was Fred Littleton, Austen Colgate, John Pitcairn, Jim Pond, David Nutt, Reggie Wilcox and George Hodge.
16. 1941 Greenland Expedition into the Arctic regions sponsored by Louise Arner Boyd of San Francisco into the Baffin Bay region. It was the first opportunity by National Bureau of Standards for an extensive study of the ionosphere at Arctic latitudes.
17. 1942 Voyage to Ungava Bay and Frobisher Bay to conduct survey work for air bases Crystal One and Crystal Two for both the US Army Air Forces and the US Navy.
18. 1943 Voyage to Frobisher Bay for supply and survey work for US military bases.
19. 1944 Voyage to southern and eastern Greenland to supply and service US weather bases.
20. 1945 Voyage to northwest Greenland to supply and service US military bases.

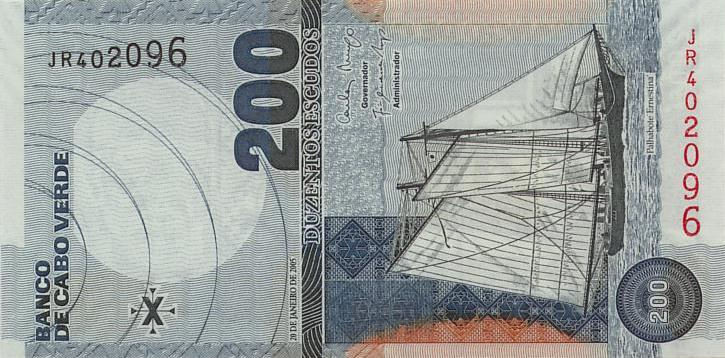
Ernestina was depicted on the 2005 200 Cape Verdean escudo banknote

=== Mid 20th century: packet ship Ernestina ===
When Captain Robert Bartlett died on April 28, 1946, Effie M. Morrissey was sold to the Jackson brothers to carry mail and passengers in an inter-island trade in the South Pacific. On their voyage to the Pacific she developed problems at sea, forcing the crew to return to New York City. On December 2, 1947, the boat caught fire of undetermined origin while docked at the Boat Basin in Flushing, New York.

The schooner was repaired and sold to Louisa Mendes of Egypt, Massachusetts. She entered the packet trade in a trans-Atlantic crossing to Cape Verde with a cargo of food and clothing. Upon reaching the islands, Captain Henrique Mendes reregistered the schooner under the name Ernestina, after his own daughter, and used her in inter-island trade. Ernestina made many transatlantic voyages and fell into disrepair at Cape Verde, where she remained until the late 1960s when interest arose in the United States to save the historic vessel. Harry Dugan and the Bartlett Exploration Association of Philadelphia made several offers to buy the ship for the South Street Seaport Museum in New York. In 1977 the people of Cape Verde agreed to give Ernestina to the people of the United States. The Foreign Minister, speaking on behalf of President Aristides Pereira said:

The Government of Cape Verde offers the Ernestina as a gift to the United States of America as an expression of the high regard of the people of Cape Verde for the people of the United States and we deliver the vessel to the State of Massachusetts as a representative of the people of the United States.

=== Late 20th century: National Historic Landmark ===
In August 1982 her hull was completely rebuilt in Cape Verde and she sailed to the United States with a Cape Verdean and American crew.

In August 1988 the schooner made a return trip to Brigus, Newfoundland, home of Capt. Bob Bartlett on the 113th anniversary of his birth. Ernestina was designated by the United States Department of the Interior as a National Historic Landmark in 1990, with restoration being completed in 1994, and in 1996 became a part of the New Bedford Whaling National Historical Park. She is owned by the Commonwealth of Massachusetts.

Built in 1894, the schooner ERNESTINA is the oldest surviving Grand Banks fishing schooner; the only surviving 19th century Gloucester-built fishing schooner; one of two remaining examples of the Fredonia-style schooners (the other being LETTIE G. HOWARD, also a National Historic Landmark), the most famous American fishing vessel type; the only offshore example of that type; and one of two sailing Arctic exploration vessels left afloat in the United States (the other being BOWDOIN, also a National Historic Landmark). Today, ERNESTINA regularly sails the New England coast on educational cruises.

— NHL designation

In 2014, the ship was given the green light by the Massachusetts Department of Recreation and Conservation to undergo a $6 million multi-year restoration project at the Boothbay Harbor Shipyard in Boothbay Harbor, Maine. After months of waiting for the weather to cooperate, the ship was finally able to reach Boothbay Harbor in April, 2015, and was hauled-out later that month.

== See also ==
- List of schooners
- List of National Historic Landmarks in Massachusetts
- National Register of Historic Places listings in New Bedford, Massachusetts
