= Alice Sakitnak Akammak =

Inuk artist

- Born: 1940 (age 85–86); Arviat, Nunavut
- Other names: Akammak Akammak, Sakitnak Akammak, Ahkammuk Akammak
- Known for: Stone carving, bead work
- Children: Mary Tutsiutok
- Notable work: "Woman with Beads" (1999); "Standing Mother and Child" (1960); "Woman in a Beaded Amautiq"
- Style: Inuk art

Alice Sakitnak Akammak (born 1940 in Nunavut) is an Inuk artist. She specializes in Arviat amautiq beaded figures, in the tradition of Eva Talooki.

Her daughter, Mary Tutsiutok (1972 - ) is also a stone carver and artist.

== Exhibitions ==
- 1992:Women of the North: An Exhibition of Art by Inuit Women of the Canadian Arctic, Marion Scott Gallery, Vancouver
- 1993: The Treasured Monument, Marion Scott Gallery, Vancouver
- 2015: Dressing It Up: Beadwork in Northern Communities, Peary-MacMillan Arctic Museum

== Collections ==
Her work is included in the collections of the Winnipeg Art Gallery, the Canadian Museum of History, Musée national des beaux-arts du Québec, the Art Gallery of Guelph and the McMichael Canadian Art Collection.

Akammak also has work in stone, fibers, skin and beads in the collection of the University of Saskatchewan, and a work in carved stone and glass beads in the collection of the Peary-MacMillan Arctic Museum at Bowdoin College.
