= Hobart Ford =

American yachtsman (1893–1965)

Hobart Ford, Sr. (1893 - 1965) was a prominent yachtsman and sailor and twice commodore of the Cruising Club of America.

Among his noted boats were the schooner Jane Doré, the Philip Rhodes designed Skål, and the Cynosure.

Hobart Ford is credited with keeping the sailing program in the New York area going during the difficult period of World War II , and with the founding of the frostbite sailing fleet in Essex..

Hobart was a flag officer of the American Yacht Club and a member of the New York Yacht Club. He was a member of the New York Stock Exchange until he retired in 1951.

== Family ==
Hobart Ford was the son of Simean Ford, owner of the former Grand Union Hotel.

Hobart Ford was married to Bertha Isabella Truman Ford (1893-1987) and had two sons and one daughter. His son Hobart Ford, Jr. (1924-1944) was killed by the sinking of the LST-531 by German E-boat torpedo.
