= Tasmanian One Design =

Class of Australian sail boat

The Tasmanian One Design is a class of Australian sail boat.

== Origin ==
In February 1900, The Rudder magazine published plans, by William Hand Jr, of a "knockabout". E H Webster, a prominent member of the Derwent Sailing Boat Club (later to become the Royal Yacht Club of Tasmania (RYCT)), was looking for a yacht to be used as a One-Design class for the club. The yacht Elf was built using (loosely) Hand's design. A few more yachts were built to variations of the design, including Caprice and Erica (built by Logan Bros in Auckland), but a one-design class was not formed.

Webster had Hand's design modified, by Hobart naval architect Alf Blore, to suit local sailing conditions and boat building practice and by 1911 had persuaded several yachtsman to build identical yachts. These yachts, built for the sum of about £200, became known simply as "One-Designers".

A total of 7 One-Designers were built in Tasmania. They are listed below, by sail number:

1. Weene - Built 1910 by Charles Lucas for E H Webster
2. Pandora - Built 1910 by Charles Lucas for D Barclay Jr
3. Curlew - Built 1911 by Charles Lucas for Douglas, Tarleton and Knight
4. Vanity - Built 1911 by Charles Lucas for W Darling, Dr Ireland and Stanley Crisp
5. Pilgrim - Built by E A Jack of Launceston for Richmond Tinning
6. Canobie - Built 1912 by Charles Lucas
7. "Gannet" - Built 1911 by Charles Lucas

Two One-Designers were built in New Zealand. These were known in New Zealand as Tasmanian One-Designers. The first, Pacific, was built by T Le Huquet in 1914 for Frank Rule, a Tasmanian. It was hoped that more would be built but the World War I put a stop to that. Pacific was wrecked in a gale in February 1918. In 1922, Vanitiewas built by Joe Slattery for the Morris brothers. She had a very successful racing career and won the Tauranga Gold Cup for the Auckland-Tauranga race in 1925. At some stage in the 1960s she was burnt out but was repaired with untreated timber. By 1983 the dry-rot was so extensive she was stripped of her fittings and cut up.

Varuna was built in Bombay, India some time prior to 1916.

In later years, Blore further modified Hand's design, lengthening it to 37 ft (11 m) over all, 22 ft (6.7 m) waterline, and several were built and sailed within the A Division of the RYCT.

The One-Designers went on to dominate racing on the River Derwent until the 1920s. Eventually outclassed by the later and larger "A-Class" yachts in the 1920s and 1930s, and too large for the "B-Class", Vanity and Weene were simply cut in half and lengthened to once again lead the fleet. Pandora had her foredeck raised and Curlew had her topsides raised by two planks. Canobie and Gannet have hulls in more or less original condition, with Canobie reverting to gaff rig in recent years.

== Original specifications ==
Category	Dimensions
Length Overall	32 feet 8 inches (9.96 m)
Length l.w.l	21 feet (6.4 m)
Overhang bow	5 feet 5 inches (1.65 m)
Overhang stern	6 feet 3 inches (1.91 m)
Beam extreme	9 feet 1 1/2 inches
Beam l.w.l	8 feet 9 inches (2.67 m)
Freeboard bow	2 feet 9 5/8 inches
Freeboard least	1-foot-10-inch (0.56 m)
Freeboard stern	2 feet 1/4 inches
Draught to rabbet	1 foot 7 1/4 inches
Draught Extreme	4 feet 8 inches (1.42 m)
Displacement pounds	7,800
Ballast iron keel, pounds	3,160
CB from stem at l.w.l	11 feet 2 1/2 inches
C.L.R	11 feet 11 inches (3.63 m)
CLR +R. from stem at l.w.l	12 feet 8 1/2 inches
C. E from stem at l.w.l	11 feet 3 1/2 inches
C. Grav. keel forward CB	1-foot (0.30 m)
Sail area square feet	667
Length cabin house	10 feet 6 inches (3.20 m)
Headroom	4 feet 9 inches (1.45 m)
Length cockpit	7 feet (2.1 m)
