= Charles N. Curtis - Sea Scout Ship 110 =

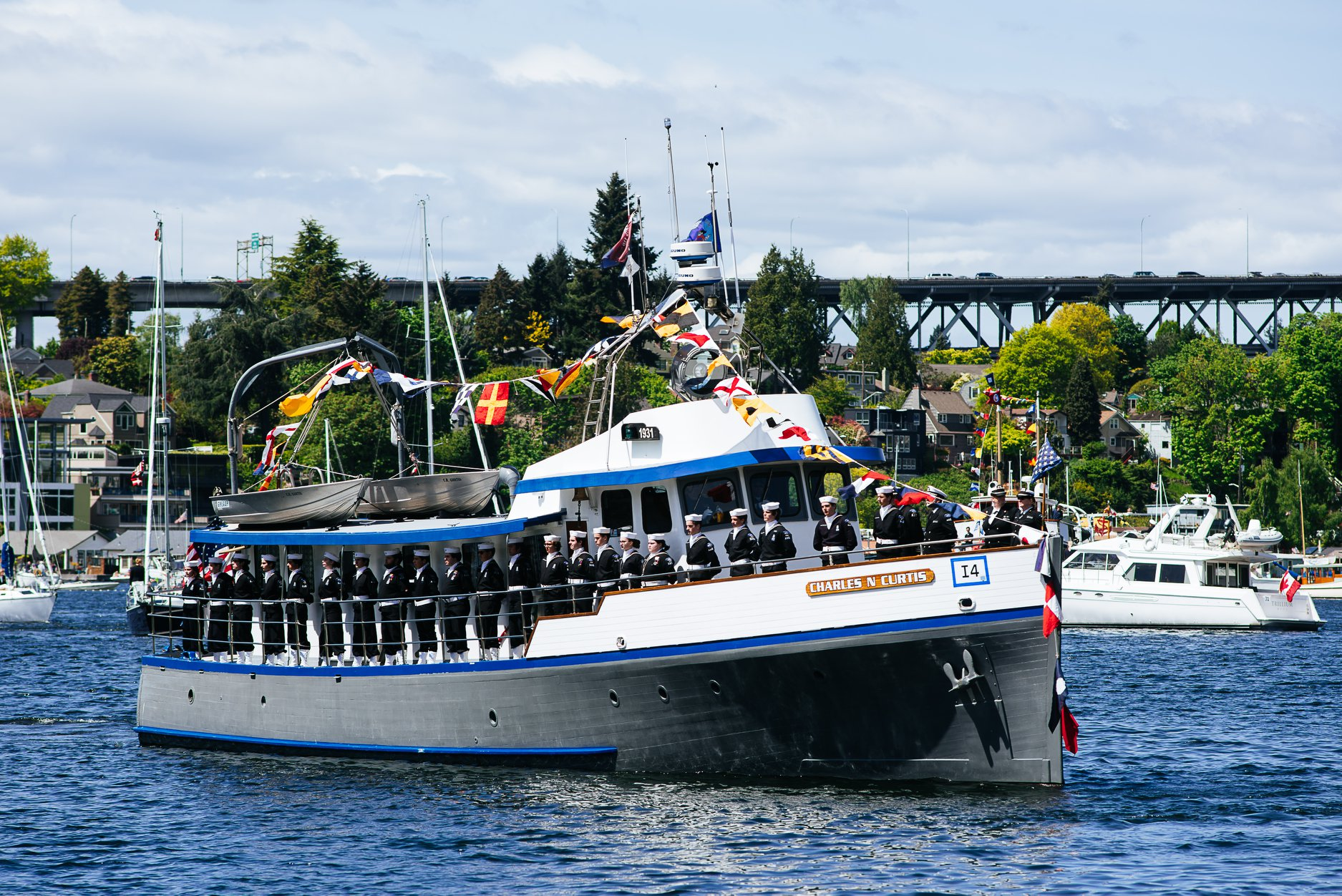
The Charles N. Curtis underway in the 2019 Seattle Yacht Club Opening Day Parade

Charles N. Curtis was a Sea Scout Ship which has been modified to fit the needs of the modern day scouting programs.

== Design/Construction ==
The Charles N. Curtis was built at Southern Ship Yards, Newport News, Virginia, as U.S. Coast Guard #402. The CG #402 has a length of 78’9”, a beam of 14’ 8” and weighs in at 43 tons. Initially the CG #402 had 2 sterling Viking II 8 cylinder gasoline engines. These were equipped with an M2 Browning .50 cal machine gun, a one-pound cannon and two depth charge racks. The CG #402 traveled at a maximum speed of 24 knots. Today the design of the Charles N. Curtis has been modified to fit the needs of the scouting program associated with the boat. The cabin galley was added in the late 1950s, and the wheelhouse was raised and moved forward for better visibility in 1972. The old Viking engines were replaced with 2 – Gray Marine 6-71 Diesel Engine in July 1946. However, the new engines only have a maximum speed of 12 knots. The machine gun, cannon and depth charge racks have all since been removed. The Curtis holds 500 gallons of fresh water in two-two hundred and fifty gallon water tanks and 1200 gallons of diesel fuel in four fuel tanks. The Curtis has four sleeping quarters that can sleep twenty-four crew, a galley, a wheelhouse, and two heads.

== History ==
The history of the Charles N. Curtis dates back to before World War II during a time of prohibition. Southern Ship Yards out of Virginia delivered six patrol crafts numbered 400 to 405 were commonly referred to as the “400” boats. The patrol craft CG #402 was delivered to the U.S. Coast Guard in 1931 at a cost of $49,000. The CG #402 was used for rum-chasing during Prohibition which ended in 1933. In June 1937, all the “400” boats were transferred to the Pacific coast. The CG #402 was renamed CG #78302 and was assigned to the Tacoma Coast Guard as their patrol boat. At the time of her arrival in Tacoma, she was regarded as the fastest boat in the area. From 1942 until 1946, the CG #78302 served as an off shore patrol boat from Port Angeles, Washington and the Columbia River. In July 1946, the CG #78302 was decommissioned and sold to the Mount Rainier Council, BSA. At the time of purchase the cutter was renamed Charles N. Curtis after the council's scout executive.

== Organization ==
Currently the Charles N. Curtis, Sea Scout Ship 110 operates out of the Pacific Harbors Council, Scouting America (formerly BSA), which was Mount Rainier Council, SA. The Curtis is believed to be the longest serving Sea Scouting (Scouting America) vessel in the United States. It is moored at the Tacoma Youth Marine Foundation located on the Thea Foss Waterway. The Curtis is a training vessel for youth ages fourteen to twenty-one. The purpose of the program is to teach leadership and responsibility through maritime skills and boating skills. The Curtis crew consists of roughly sixty to seventy adult and youth. The crew of the Curtis meets two or more days a week depending on their schedule of events. On an average the crew participates in over 100 activities, provides over 50 hours of community service, and spends over 85 days underway in a given year.

Some of their activities include the Daffodil Marine Parade, Seattle's Yacht Club Opening Day, the Wooden Boat Show in Olympia, the Special People Cruise, and the Tacoma lighted Boat Parade to name a few.

== Personnel ==
The Curtis has several licensed captains and mates which consist of adult volunteers to help train and guide the youth of tomorrow. The organization is youth led. The crew have several leadership positions within their ranks. They include the Boatswain, Deck Crew Leader, Engine Crew Leader, Navigation Crew Leader, and Yeoman. The youth assigned to these positions are responsible for developing training plans and goals for the program. They coordinate with adult leaders to ensure available training resources. The youth that participate in the program learn valuable skills while operating the boat. While on the boat they are assigned to different crews based on their knowledge and experience.

Senior Crew: Senior crew are the youth that have been in the program for several years and have developed the skills, knowledge, and are capable of teaching the younger scouts those skills. Most of the senior crew, have graduated from high school and are in college.

Boatswain: Lead all crew. The deck crew leader, engine crew leader, navigation crew leader, and yeoman report to the boatswain. The Boatswain in turn reports to the skipper. The Boatswain conducts the quarterdeck meetings, knows the needs of the ship and crew and appoints crew to head committees for activities. The boat can be maneuvered with as little as three people, a skipper, an engineer, and a deck crew. However, that is not an easy task with only 3 people. Ideally the Curtis can operate with seven people during a charter. There should always be one captain on board, but two is preferred especially for overnight cruises.

Deck Crew: This crew is the crew responsible for handling the lines when the boat is preparing for getting underway or while docking. They also perform various watches while the boat is underway. These watches are Stern, log and helm duties. When they are not performing these duties they are responsible for keeping the deck clean.

Engine Crew: The engine crew is responsible for the two 6-71 diesel engines and the two generators that are on board. They also assist with the maintenance of the water, fuel, electrical and sewer functions on the boat. This crew monitors the engines while underway and is responsible to answer the telegraph. The telegraph is how the captain relays information to the engine room telling the engine crew what speed to operate the boat at.

Navigation Crew: This crew is responsible for monitoring radio communications and plotting courses for the boat. They maintain logs of when and where the boat is going, check in with marine traffic by radio, and keep a record of who is on the boat.

== Rank Advancement ==
The youth on the Charles N. Curtis work on achieving rank advancement. The ranks are Apprentice, Ordinary, Able, and Quartermaster Award (Scouting America). The Quartermaster rank is the highest rank you can earn while in Sea Scouts, which became coed in 1971 and is for 14 to 21 year olds. The scouts are awarded their rank at a ceremony which is called a Bridge of Honor once a year. They are also awarded badges for long cruise, swimming, areas in which they specialize, scholarships, and Boatswain of the Year.

== See also ==
- S.S.S. Lotus: Another Sea Scouting ship
