= Rock Solid Builds =

Canadian reality TV series

Rock Solid Builds is a Canadian home renovation reality television series, which premiered February 18, 2021 on HGTV Canada. The series centres on home renovations in Newfoundland and Labrador, led by Brigus-based contractor Randy Spracklin and his Newfound Builds company. Unlike the format common to most contemporary home renovation series, which typically depict a single complete renovation per episode, Rock Solid Builds features a mix of major "story arc" projects whose ongoing process is depicted across multiple episodes, and smaller "B-story" projects which are given a portion of a single episode.

Production of the series began in November 2019, and proceeded through much of 2020. Production was only minimally impacted by the COVID-19 pandemic in Canada; according to Spracklin, it sometimes led to minor delays in the delivery of construction supplies, but due to the relatively low rates of COVID-19 transmission in Newfoundland at the time the series was being filmed, production was able to continue with some safety precautions. Production was much more significantly impacted by the province's "Snowmageddon" blizzard of January 2020.

The highest-rated new show on Canadian specialty cable services in 2021, the series was renewed for a second season, which premiered in January 2022; Spracklin noted that the second season projects were more affected by COVID-related supply chain issues than the first season had been. The show also reportedly led to a noticeable increase in tourism in the Brigus area in 2021.

A third season entered production in 2022, which premiered in 2024.

The series received a Canadian Screen Award nomination for Best Lifestyle Series at the 11th Canadian Screen Awards in 2023.
