= Robert Bartlett (explorer) =

Newfoundlander-American explorer (1875–1946)

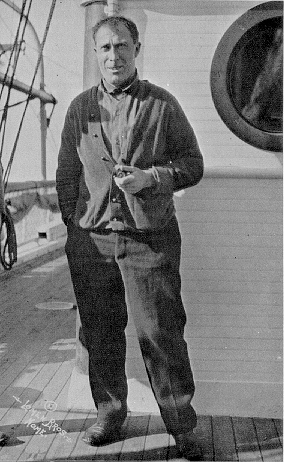
- Bartlett in 1914
- Born: August 15, 1875; Brigus, Newfoundland Colony
- Died: April 28, 1946 (aged 70); New York City, U.S.
- Occupations: Maritime explorer, navigator
- Title: Captain
- Relatives: John Bartlett (uncle); Rupert Bartlett (nephew)
- Awards: Hubbard Medal; Charles P. Daly Medal; Peary Polar Expedition Medal

Robert Abram Bartlett (August 15, 1875 – April 28, 1946) was a Newfoundland-born American Arctic explorer of the late 19th and early 20th centuries.

== Early life ==
Born in Brigus, Colony of Newfoundland, Bartlett was the oldest of ten children born to William James Bartlett and Mary J. Leamon, and heir to a family tradition of seafaring. He grew up in Hawthorne Cottage in Brigus. By the age of 17, he mastered his first ship and began a lifelong love affair with the Arctic Ocean.

== Career ==
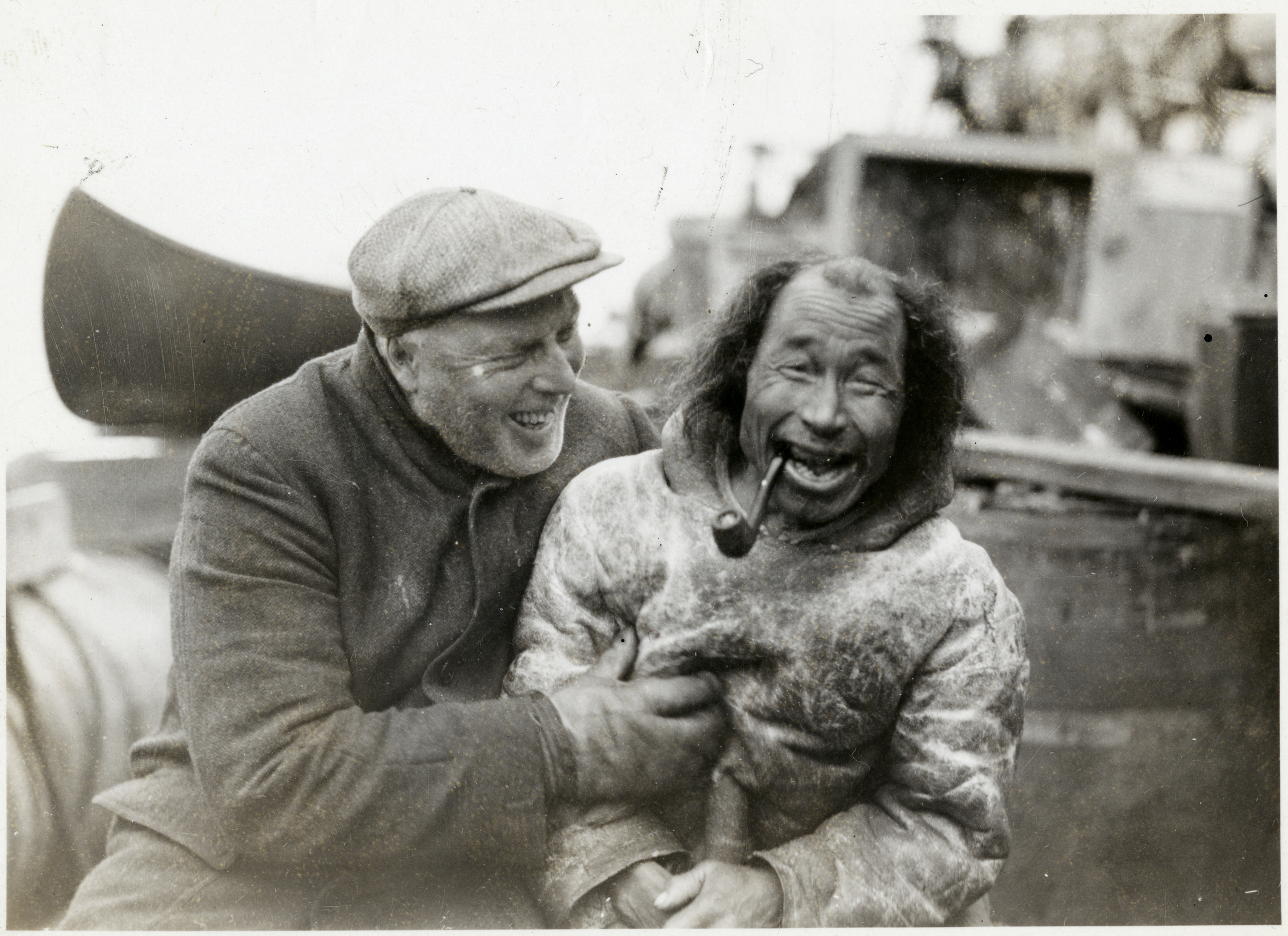
Bob Bartlett and local inhabitant aboard ship during Bartlett's Arctic Expedition, 1933

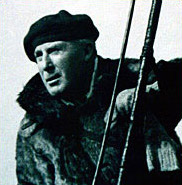
Captain Robert Bartlett

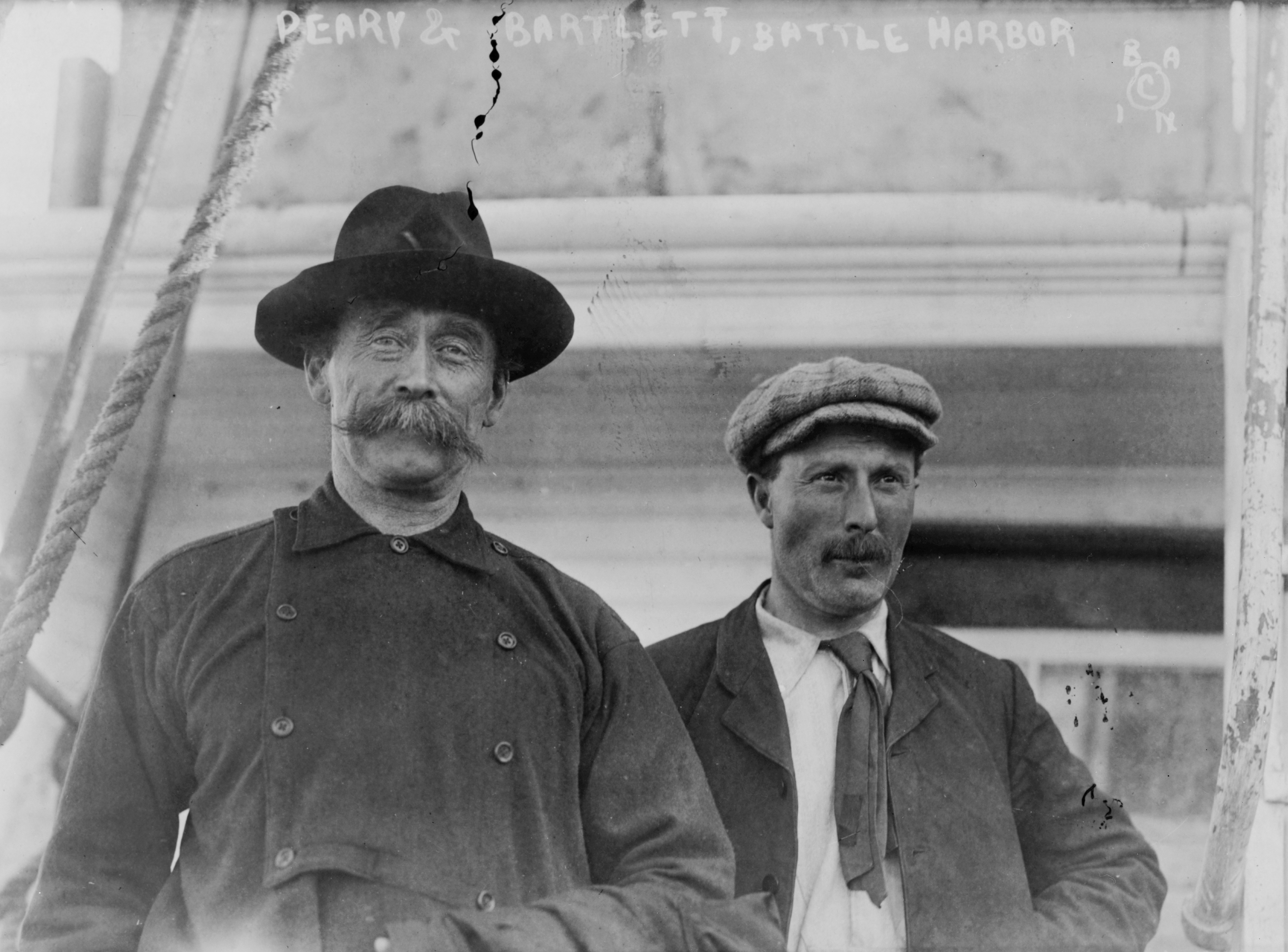
Robert Peary (left) and Captain Robert Bartlett, standing on ship, Battle Harbour, Labrador in 1909

Bartlett spent more than 50 years mapping and exploring the waters of the Far North and led over 40 expeditions to the Arctic, more than anyone before or since.

Bartlett was captain of the SS Roosevelt and accompanied United States Navy Commander Robert Peary on his attempts to reach the North Pole. He was awarded the Hubbard Medal of the National Geographic Society for breaking the trail through the frozen Arctic Sea to within 150 miles of the pole, yet was excluded from the final exploring party (possibly due to a rivalry between the two men). Bartlett took a ship and was the first person to sail north of 88° N.

In 1914, Bartlett's leadership in the doomed Karluk Expedition helped save the lives of most of its stranded participants after leader Vilhjalmur Stefansson abandoned the expedition. After being stranded for several months, Bartlett and Inuk hunter Kataktovik walked 700 miles from Wrangel Island over the ice of the Chukchi Sea and across Siberia and then mounted an expedition from Alaska to rescue his surviving companions on Wrangel Island. He received the highest award from the Royal Geographical Society for his outstanding heroism. However, despite his popularity among the press, the public, and those he had rescued, he was later censured by an admiralty commission for taking Karluk into the Arctic, and for allowing a party of four (the expedition's medical officer Alistair Forbes Mackay, biologist James Murray, anthropologist Henri Beuchat, and seaman Stanley Morris) to leave the main group—despite a letter that Mackay and the others had signed, absolving the captain from responsibility (all four subsequently died).

In 1917, Bartlett rescued the members of Donald Baxter MacMillan's ill-fated Crocker Land Expedition, who had been stuck on the ice for four years.

From 1925 to 1945, at the command of his own schooner, Effie M. Morrissey, Bartlett led many important scientific expeditions to the Arctic sponsored by American museums, the Explorers Club and the National Geographic Society. He also helped to survey the Arctic for the United States Government during World War II.

In 1931, Bartlett starred as Captain Barker in the film The Viking about a sealing ship in Newfoundland. The film was shot on location and during the filming of several action scenes, the ship on which filming was taking place exploded, killing 28 men. Despite this, the film was still released. In it, Bartlett plays the captain of the sealing vessel The Viking who is proud of his reputation for never having lost a man.

== Personal life and death ==
Bartlett was a teetotaler, saying that he didn't drink alcohol "because God gave me my body and I propose to take care of it."

Bartlett died when he was 70 in a New York City hospital from pneumonia and was buried in his hometown of Brigus, Newfoundland and Labrador. Hawthorne Cottage, Bartlett's place of residence in Brigus, is a National Historic Site of Canada.

== Awards and honors ==
In 1909, Bartlett was awarded the Hubbard Medal by the National Geographic Society which is awarded for distinction in exploration, discovery, and research. In 1927, the Boy Scouts of America made Bartlett an Honorary Scout, a new category of Scout created that same year. This distinction was given to "American citizens whose achievements in outdoor activity, exploration and worthwhile adventure are of such an exceptional character as to capture the imagination of boys...". Among others who were awarded this distinction were included Richard E. Byrd, Charles Lindbergh, and Orville Wright.

He was awarded an Honorary Fellowship from the American Geographical Society in 1918, and its Daly Medal in 1925. In 1944, he was awarded the Peary Polar Expedition Medal. The Canadian Coast Guard vessel CCGS Bartlett is named for Bartlett. Canada Post featured Bartlett on a Canadian postage stamp released on July 10, 2009.

== In fiction ==
Robert “Bob” Bartlett is a major character in the 2004 novel The Big Why by author Michael Winter. Author Eric Walters documented some of the aspects of his journey to find Arctic islands in the historical novels Trapped in Ice and The Pole. Bartlett and Kataktovik's journey through Chukotka, Siberia is recounted as an episode in Chukchi author Yuri Rytkheu's novel A Dream in Polar Fog.
