= Donald Baxter MacMillan =

American explorer and sailor

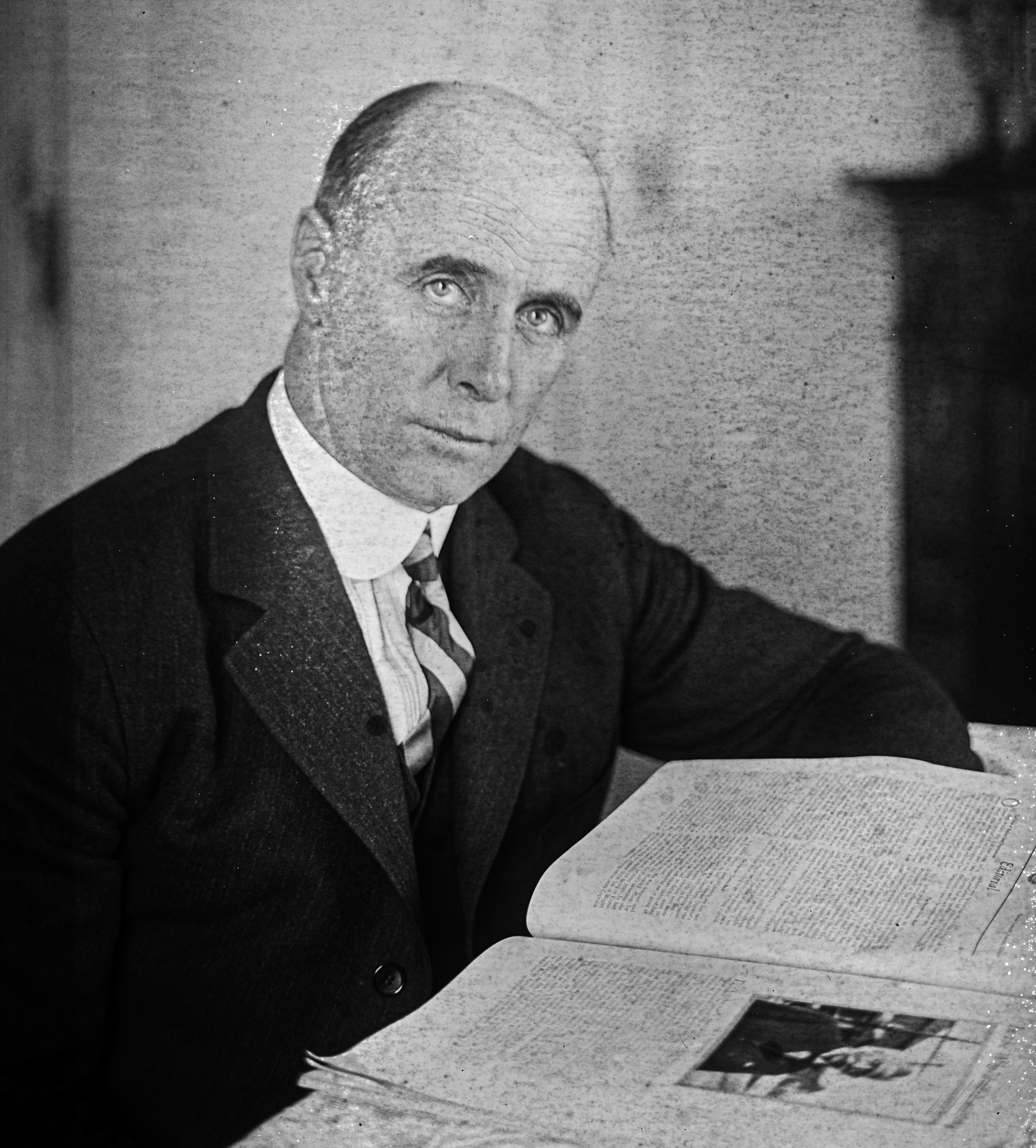
- Born: November 10, 1874; Provincetown, Massachusetts, U.S.
- Died: September 7, 1970 (aged 95); Provincetown, Massachusetts, U.S.
- Education: Bowdoin College
- Spouse: Miriam Norton Look
- Military career
- Allegiance: United States
- Branch/Service: United States Navy
- Service years: 1918–38; 1941–45
- Rank: Rear admiral
- Nicknames: Inuktitut: Nagelak, ('Leader')
- Awards: Peary Polar Expedition Medal; Naval Reserve Medal; American Defense Service Medal; American Campaign Medal; World War II Victory Medal
- Memorials: MacMillan Wharf, Provincetown, Massachusetts
- Other work: 30 Arctic expeditions between 1908 and 1954

Donald Baxter MacMillan (November 10, 1874 – September 7, 1970) was an American explorer, sailor, researcher and lecturer who made over 30 expeditions to the Arctic from 1908 until 1957 during his 46-year career.

He pioneered the use of radios, airplanes, and electricity in the Arctic and put together a dictionary of the Inuktitut language. His expeditions produced Inuit films, photographs of Arctic scenes, and audio recordings of Inuit languages, thousands of which were taken by American sailor Miriam MacMillan.

In 1921, he commissioned the schooner Bowdoin, which sailed to the Arctic two dozen times.

== Early life and education ==
Born in Provincetown, Massachusetts, in 1874, Donald MacMillan lived in Freeport, Maine, after the deaths of both his parents in 1883 (his father died while captaining a Grand Banks fishing schooner) and 1886 (his mother died suddenly), and was educated at Bowdoin College in Brunswick, graduating in 1898 with a degree in geology.

== Career ==
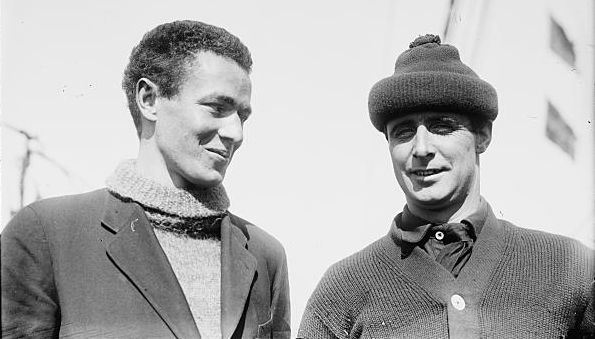
1909 photograph of MacMillan (right) with explorer George Borup.

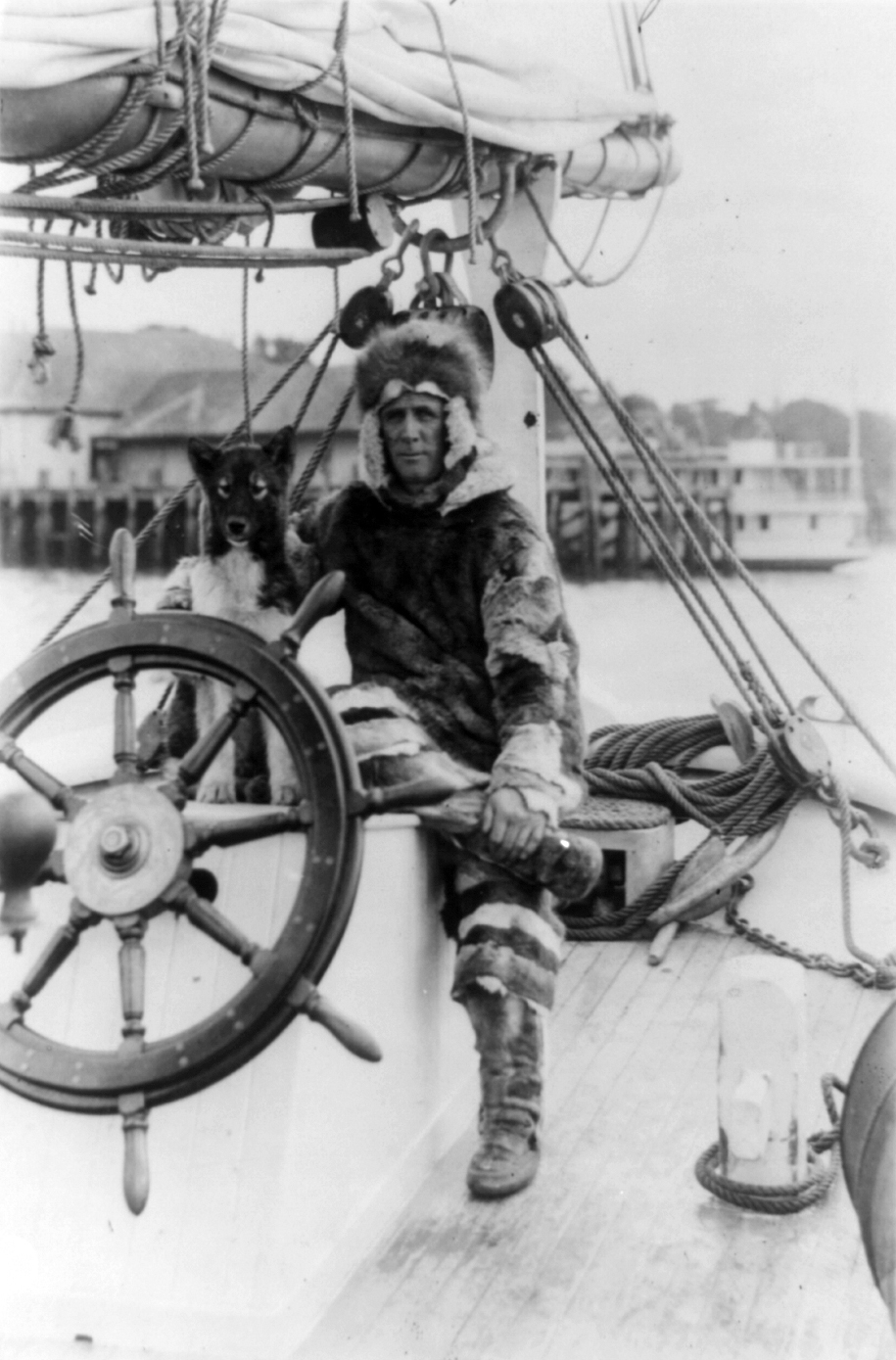
Circa 1922; Donald MacMillan in fur suit at wheel of the schooner he designed: the Bowdoin

Donald MacMillan taught first in Gorham, Maine, at the Levi Hall School, from 1898 to 1900.

MacMillan taught at Worcester Academy from 1903 to 1908. After five years as a high school teacher, MacMillan caught the attention of explorer and fellow Bowdoin graduate Robert E. Peary when he saved the lives of nine shipwrecked people in two nights. Peary subsequently invited MacMillan to join his 1908 journey to the North Pole. Although MacMillan himself had to turn back at 84°29' on March 14 because of frozen heels, Peary allegedly reached the Pole 26 days later.

MacMillan spent the next few years traveling in Labrador, carrying out ethnological studies among the Innu and Inuit. He organized and commanded the ill-fated Crocker Land Expedition to northern Greenland in 1913. Crocker Land turned out to be a mirage. The expedition members were stranded until 1917, when Captain Robert A. Bartlett of the ship Neptune finally rescued them.

On December 24, 1918, shortly after the armistice which ended the First World War, MacMillan was commissioned an ensign in the Naval Reserve Flying Corps. MacMillan was 44 years old at the time, making him one of the oldest ensigns in the history of the U.S. Navy. After the war, MacMillan began raising money for another Arctic expedition. In 1921, the schooner Bowdoin—the namesake of MacMillan's alma mater—was launched from East Boothbay, Maine and set sail for Baffin Island, where MacMillan and his crew spent the winter. The expedition was notable for taking along an amateur radio operator, Don Mix, who used station WNP ("Wireless North Pole") to keep them in contact with the outside world.

In 1923 there was concern about a new ice age and he again sailed toward the North Pole aboard the Bowdoin, sponsored by the National Geographical Society to look for evidence of advancing glaciers.

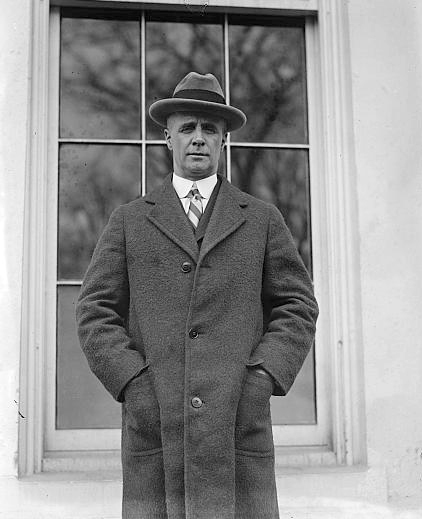
MacMillan at the White House on March 30, 1925.

In 1925 MacMillan led a scientific expedition again backed by the National Geographical Society and financed primarily by the Chicago entrepreneur Eugene McDonald, which was accompanied by U.S. Navy personnel and planes commanded by Lt. Cmdr. Richard E. Byrd. The planes were to be used for aerial surveys of Baffin Island and Ellesmere Island, investigation of the Greenland icecap, and reconnaissance of previously unexplored areas of the Arctic Sea. The aerial results proved to be disappointing due to severe weather conditions, unreliable engines and inadequate navigational tools although Byrd would use this experience in preparing for his attempt to reach the North Pole the following year. The expedition is noted for the successful demonstration of shortwave radio in communications from the Arctic Region; the U.S. Navy used longer wavelengths and could not maintain reliable communication, unlike amateur radio operators John Reinartz and 16 year old Arthur A. Collins who thus gained national recognition.

In the summer of 1926 MacMillan led a group of explorers which included three women and five scientists collecting flora and fauna in Labrador and Greenland. He believed it was possible that the ancient ruins off Sculpin Island, twenty miles from Nain, Labrador, were the remains of a Norse settlement 1,000 years old. On the side bordering the mainland MacMillan found what he considered the vestiges of ten or twelve houses. He estimated the age of the dwellings to be hundreds of years old according to the lichens which partially covered their foundations. However MacMillan could not say for certain if these had been built by Vikings. According to Inuit tradition the "stone igloos" were constructed by men who came from the sea in ships. Inuit called the site Tunitvik, meaning the place of the Norseman. MacMillan said the strongest argument that the Sculpin dwellings were of Viking origin was their resemblance to those he found in Greenland the previous year. However the argument that Sculpin Island was a Norse settlement was refuted by geographer Väinö Tanner in 1941.

In 1939, MacMillan was pictured in a portrait photograph taken by his wife Miriam MacMillan on the Bowdoin, in his Captain's hat, holding a puppy named Kahda. The Maine Historical Society explains: "Some of Donald MacMillan's work in the Arctic relied on sleds pulled by dogs especially bred for working. Occasionally a particular dog, like Kahda, became a pet as well. MacMillan was known to be fond of dogs and very good at working with them -- skills he learned from Inuit companions on his first Arctic expedition with Robert Peary in 1908-1909."

=== World War II ===
MacMillan was placed on the Naval Reserve Honorary Retired List with the rank of lieutenant commander on his 64th birthday in 1938. Despite being past retirement age, he volunteered for active duty with the Navy during World War II.

On May 22, 1941, he transferred the Bowdoin to the Navy for the duration of the war and served as her initial commanding officer before being transferred to the Hydrographic Office in Washington, D.C. He was promoted to the rank of commander on June 13, 1942.

=== 1945-1970 ===
After 1945, MacMillan continued his trips to the Arctic, taking researchers north and carrying supplies for the MacMillan-Moravian School he established in 1929.

On June 25, 1954, MacMillan was promoted, by a special act of Congress, to rank of rear admiral on the Naval Reserve retired list in honor of his lifetime of service and achievement.

Admiral MacMillan made his final trip to the Arctic in 1957 at age 82, and died in 1970 at the age of 95. He is buried in Provincetown, Massachusetts, where a main wharf is named after him.

== Personal life ==
MacMillan often visited his close friends Jerome and Amy Look between Arctic expeditions. Each time, he would bring gifts for their daughter, sailor Miriam Norton Look; "a beaded craft, an ivory figurine, or some other token of his adventures in the North." Look referred to MacMillan as "Uncle Dan," and they would correspond via letters.

While piloting her Sea Pup motorboat, Look recognized Donald MacMillan's 88-foot Bowdoin schooner, which had dropped anchor near Bustins Island. Look piloted her boat to MacMillan, who ran summer camps for boys on the island, and asked if he needed a ride. MacMillan accepted her offer, as he stated he had a dinner date that evening; however, the boat ran out of gas minutes later, and MacMillan was a half-hour late to his dinner date. Nevertheless, he stated he was impressed with Look's "expert control" of the motorboat.

On March 18, 1935, when he was 61 years old, MacMillan married sailor, author, and photographer Miriam Norton Look, then 29 years old.

In 1937, Miriam MacMillan said she would like to accompany MacMillan to the Inuit town of Nunainguk, Newfoundland and Labrador. He agreed on the stipulation that she would arrive in nearby Hopedale without his assistance. Deciding it would be a race, MacMillan reached Hopedale days before her husband did, traveling by train and mail carrier. Before his arrival, she studied Inuktitut, custom-made Inuit clothing, and asked locals to tell her stories about Donald. When MacMillan arrived, he mistook her for an Inuk woman. Following this, MacMillan was a member of the crew on her husband's Arctic explorations; she joined 9 Arctic voyages, collecting photographs, artifacts, films, and audio recordings. From 1937 onward, Miriam MacMillan joined her husband on 9 Arctic expeditions as part of his crew. She took thousands of photographs, films, Inuit art artifacts, and audio recordings of Inuit, which she later organized and curated for the Peary-MacMillan Arctic Museum.

== Honors ==
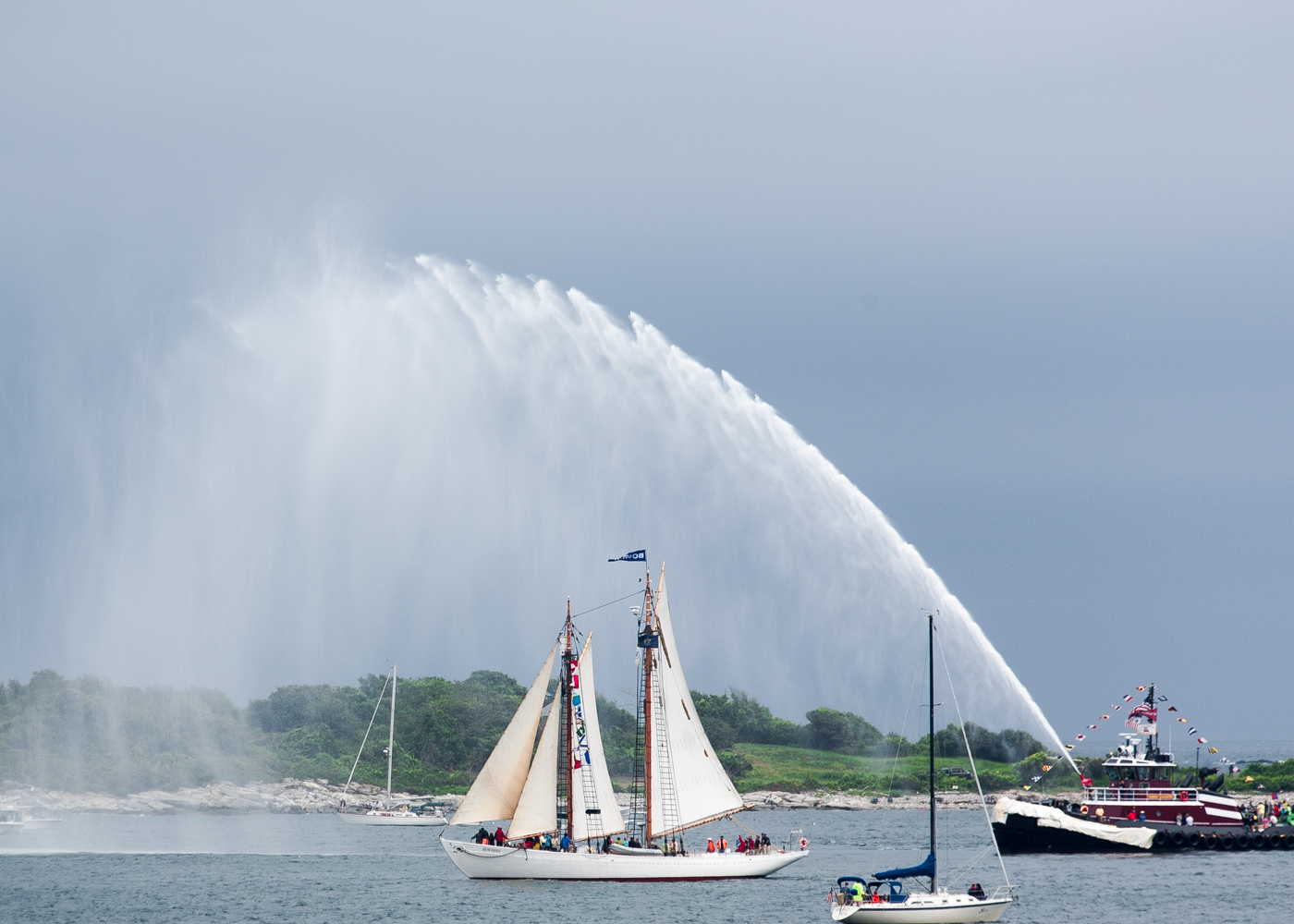
MacMillan's Bowdoin schooner in 2015 (center)

In 1927, the Boy Scouts of America made MacMillan an Honorary Scout, a new category of Scout created that same year. This distinction was given to "American citizens whose achievements in outdoor activity, exploration and worthwhile adventure are of such an exceptional character as to capture the imagination of boys...". The other eighteen who were awarded this distinction were: Roy Chapman Andrews; Robert Bartlett; Frederick Russell Burnham; Richard E. Byrd; George Kruck Cherrie; James L. Clark; Merian C. Cooper; Lincoln Ellsworth; Louis Agassiz Fuertes; George Bird Grinnell; Charles A. Lindbergh; Clifford H. Pope; George Palmer Putnam; Kermit Roosevelt; Carl Rungius; Stewart Edward White; and Orville Wright.

MacMillan Pier in Provincetown is named in his honor.

The bagpipe band at Robert E. Peary High School in Rockville, Maryland, was formed and named after him with his permission in 1961. The adult MacMillan Pipe Band continues to this day, formed by the graduates of the high school pipe band.

=== Medals awarded by the United States Government ===
- Peary Polar Expedition Medal
- Naval Reserve Medal
- American Defense Service Medal
- American Campaign Medal
- World War II Victory Medal
