= SSS Lotus =

- U.S. National Register of Historic Places
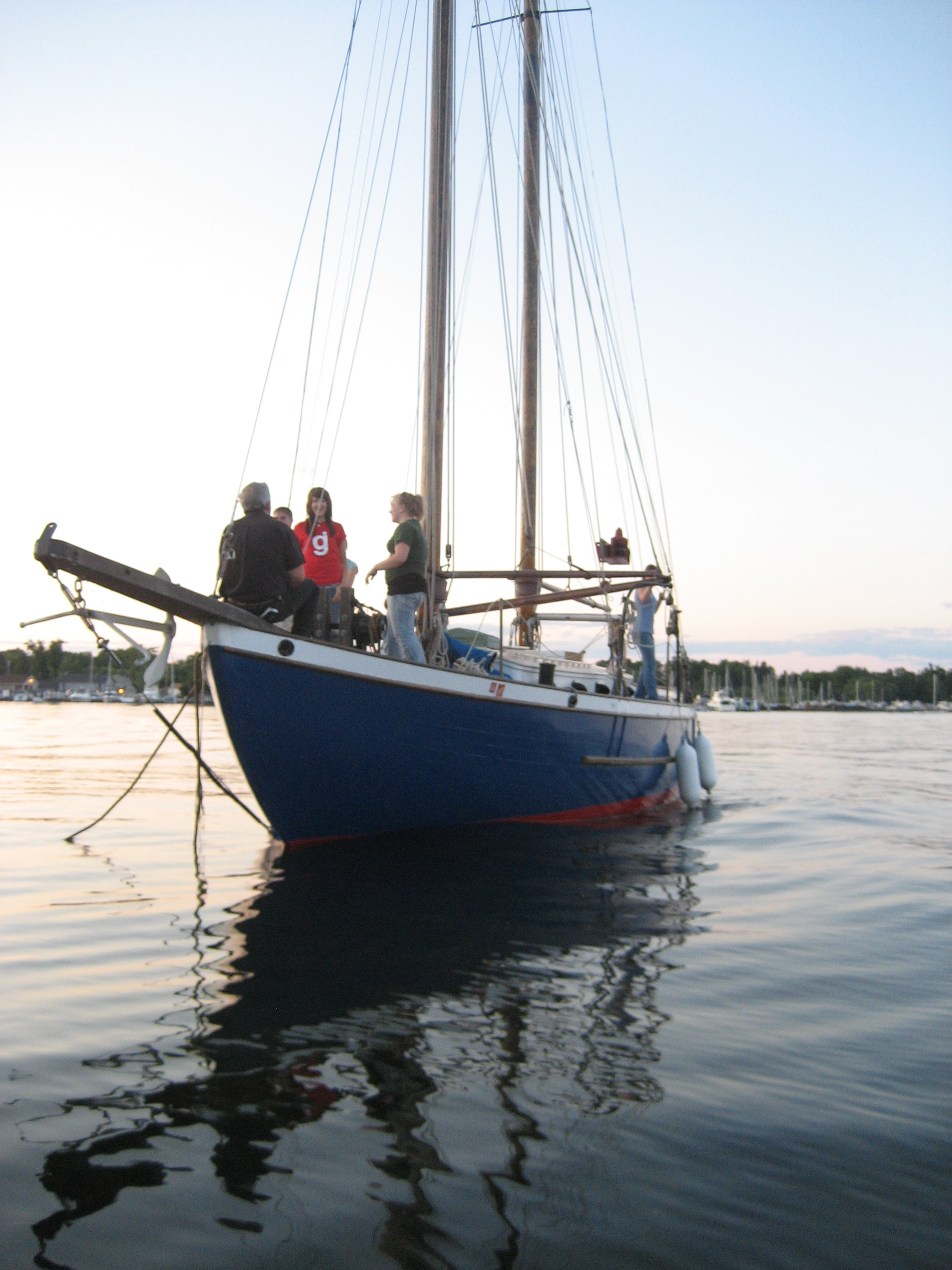
- Lotus at mooring in Sodus Bay, July 2007

- Location within New York Location within the United States
- Location: Katlynn Marine, Inc., 7448 State Route 14,Sodus Point, New York
- Coordinates: 43°15′59″N 76°59′29″W
- Area: less than one acre
- Built: 1916
- Architect: Hand, William H., Jr.; Zickes, Ted
- Architectural style: Auxiliary Schooner
- NRHP reference No.: 90000694
- Added to NRHP: May 10, 1990

The SSS (Sea Scout Ship) Lotus is a historic gaff rigged schooner. Her home port is Sodus Bay in Wayne County, New York, United States. She is owned and operated by the "Friends of the Schooner Lotus."

== History of Lotus ==
The keel on Lotus was laid down in 1917 and the boat was completed in 1918, in Rocky River, Ohio. Designed by the naval architect William Hand Jr. in 1916, and christened with the name of Miss Gloucester, she was designed as a pleasure yacht for sailing on the Great Lakes.

As Miss Gloucester, she was commissioned by Thomas B. Van Dorn, to be the Van Dorn family yacht. The Van Dorn family sailed her on Lake Erie and perhaps Lake Huron.

In 1922, the ship was sold to Stephen Estes Comstock of Newark, New York. He moved the ship to Sodus Bay, on Lake Ontario, and renamed her Lotus, after the wild water lilies that grew in the bay.

Lotus was sold again in 1938, to Dick Todd and Ken Cooley. They renamed her again, this time to Dickens, a combination of their first names.

In 1943, Ezra Hale and his partners bought the ship and changed her name back to Lotus. Ezra Hale and John Trahey donated Lotus to the Otetiana Council of the Boy Scouts of America in 1971, specifying that Sea Explorer Ship (now Sea Scout Ship) 303, chartered by the Kiwanis Club of Webster, New York, be the ones to use it. The Sea Explorer Ship 303 had begun in 1965, and used a variety of power cruisers before the Lotus was donated. The skipper of SES 303, at the time of the donation was Captain Tom Horn Retired USN.

Unfortunately, it was difficult to keep up with the required maintenance and by 1991 Lotus needed serious restoration. With the support of the Kiwanis Club, the money was raised for a restoration, soliciting donations from individuals and corporations. A matching funds grant was also received from New York State, which brought the total amount of money raised to $150,000.

Lotus was trucked to Rivendell Marine, in Rhode Island, in 1991. The refit was completed in 1993. For the following 14 years, Lotus was sailed by members of Sea Scout Ship 303 around all of Lake Ontario. Lotus visited many harbor festivals and reenactments each year including Alexandria Bay Pirate Week, Oswego Harborfest, and reenactments in Sackets Harbor. Lotus has also participated several times in Operation Sail. In 2009 Otetiana Council, BSA and Finger Lakes Council, BSA merged to form Seneca Waterways Council, BSA with operations centered in Rochester, New York.

== Present ==
By the end of the 2017 season, Lotus was in serious need of repair. Declining membership in Sea Scout Ship 303 resulted in the unit becoming dormant and the end of its 50-year charter relationship with the Kiwanis Club of Webster. Later that year, the unit was re-invigorated by a group of sailors and re-chartered under the Newport Yacht Club in Irondequoit, New York, with the understanding that the Seneca Waterways Council would make arrangements for the care of Lotus. Sea Scout Ship 303 and several caring volunteers made attempts to protect her from the elements over the next few years, but with little success. She was in a state of abandonment and deteriorated rapidly.

In 2019 the Seneca Waterways Council Scouting Historical Society began assembling a Lotus and Sea Scout Ship 303 archive. The efforts culminated in a large exhibit at the council office that opened in February 2020. By that time "The Friends of the Schooner Lotus," organized in Sodus Point, New York at the end of 2019, had begun meeting monthly. A Facebook group was created and efforts were begun to obtain ownership of Lotus. A marine survey determined that the value of the schooner was far less than the financial obligation required to store her. By that summer, several setbacks brought on by the COVID-19 pandemic, legal and financial concerns, differences of opinions on restoration methods and other issues involving the owners made it seem like there was no hope of saving Lotus and that she would likely be scrapped by the end of the year.

On December 14, 2020, an agreement was reached and ownership was transferred to "The Friends of the Schooner Lotus". With determined efforts of the new owners over the following several days including help from Katlynn Marine, Lotus was prepared for transport. On December 21, 2020, she was trucked to Beacon Bay Marina and Cayuga Wooden Boat Works. Efforts are now underway to raise the funds necessary to begin the lengthy restoration of Lotus.

== Specifications ==
=== Dimensions ===
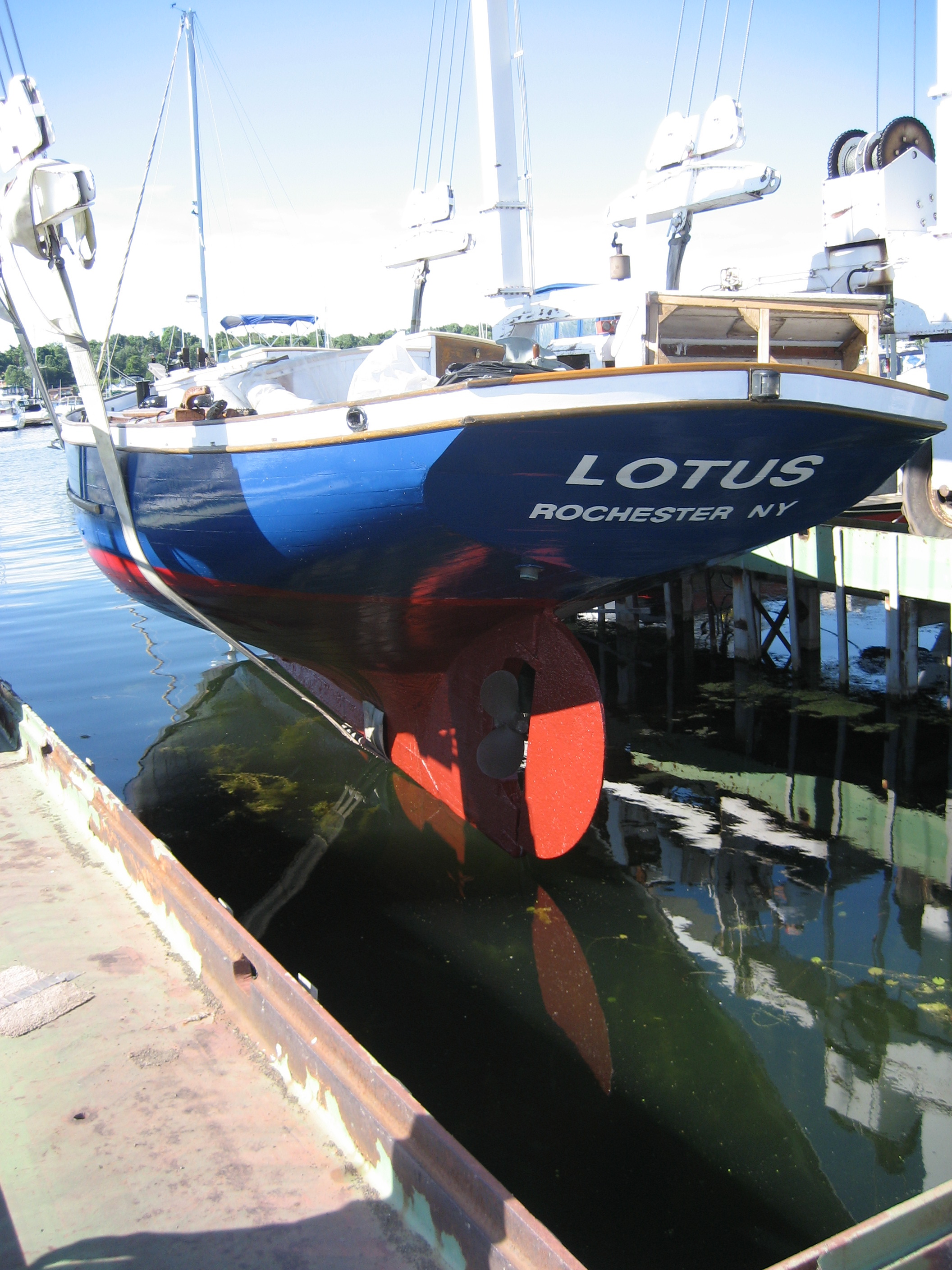
Lotus lowered into Sodus Bay, July 2007

- Length: 48 feet (15 m) on deck, 60 feet (18 m) from the tip of the bowsprit to the end of the main boom.
- Beam: 12 feet (3.7 m), 3 inches
- Draft: 4 feet (1.2 m), 9 inches
- Weight: 16 tons (approximate)
- Total Sail Area: 950 square feet (88 m^{2})

=== Engine ===
- Yanmar 88 hp (66 kW) four cylinder, turbo-charged diesel with sealed heat exchange

=== Materials ===
- Masts: Sitka Spruce
- Frames: Oak
- Original Hull Planking: Long-leaf Yellow Pine
- Replacement Hull Planking: Mahogany
- Main Deck: Vertical-grain Douglas Fir
- Cockpit Deck: Long-leaf Yellow Pine
- Original Cabin Tops: Canvas

== See also ==
- Sea Scouting (Boy Scouts of America)
- List of schooners
- Charles N. Curtis - Sea Scout Ship 110
