= Hawthorne Cottage =

National Historic Site in Brigus, Newfoundland and Labrador

Coordinates: 47°32′6.54″N 53°12′35.53″W

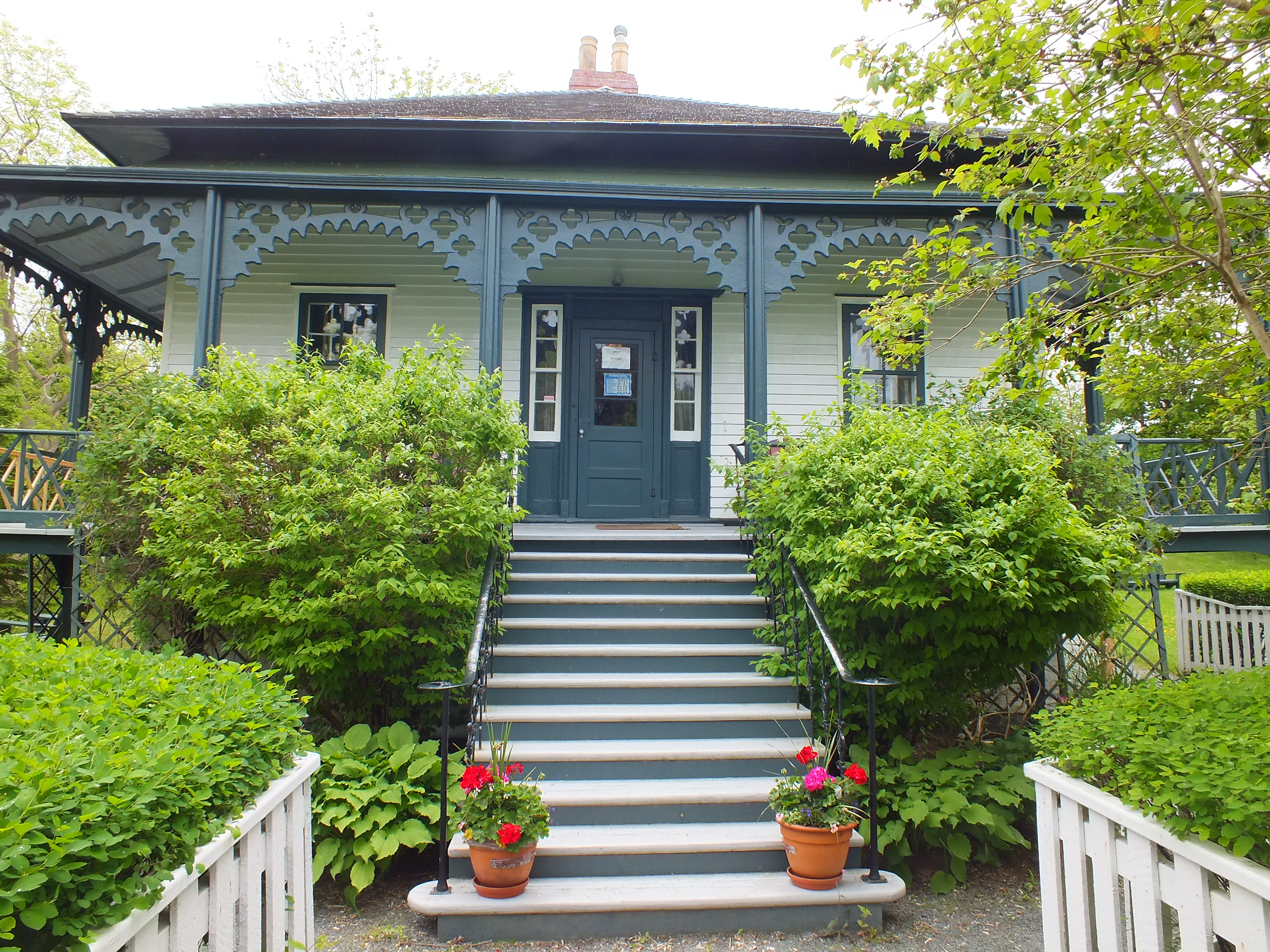
- Established: 1830
- Location: Brigus, Newfoundland
- Website: Hawthorne Cottage National Historic Site and www.historicsites.ca

National Historic Site of Canada
- Official name: Hawthorne Cottage National Historic Site
- Designated: 1978

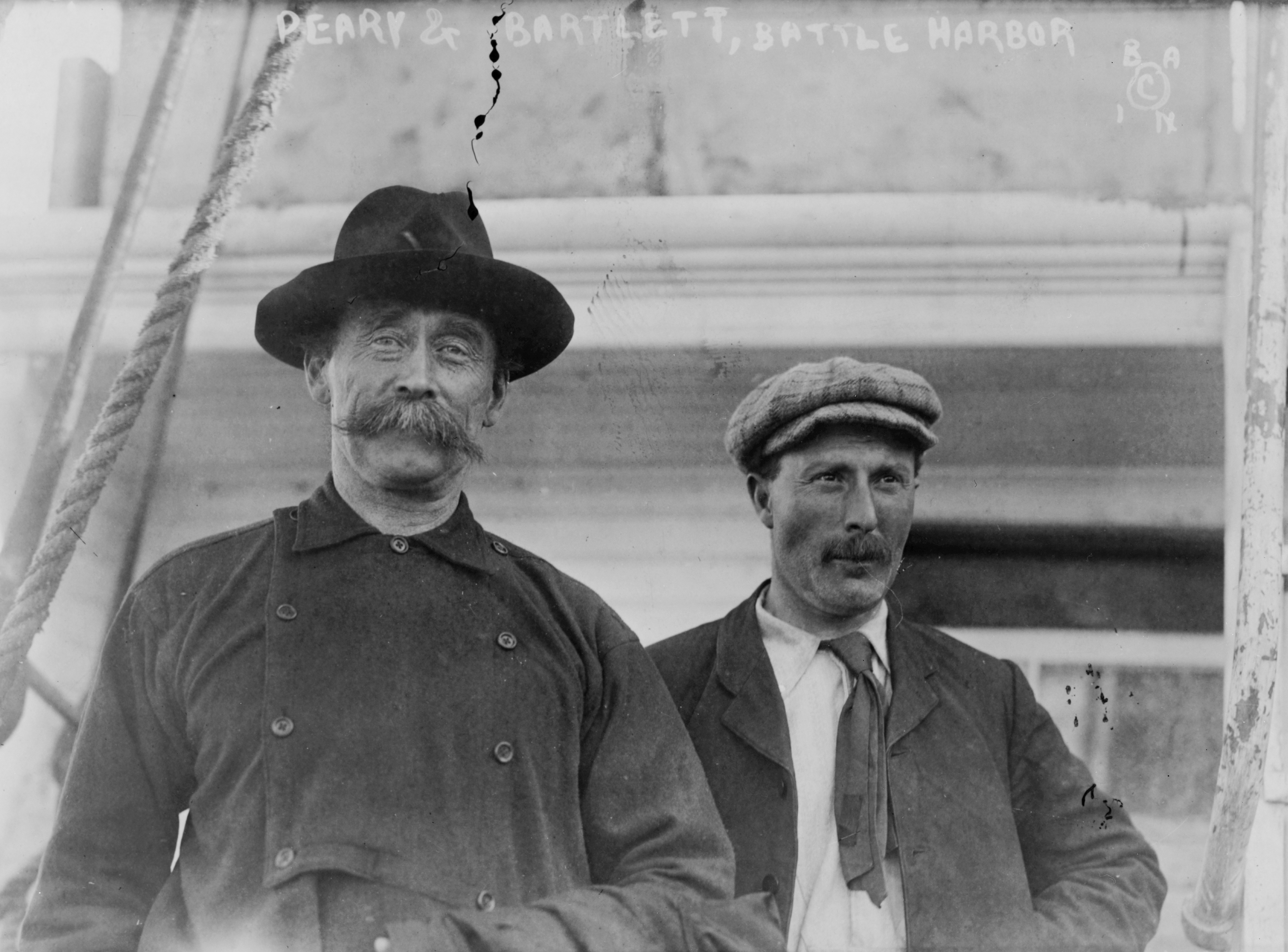
Captain Robert Bartlett (right) and Robert Edwin Peary

Hawthorne Cottage is a National Historic Site located in Brigus, Newfoundland and Labrador. It is a unit of the national park system, operated by Parks Canada, the national park service. It was the residence of Captain Bob Bartlett, a famed Arctic explorer. Bartlett is credited by marine historian Thomas Appleton with "the finest feat of leadership in Canadian Marine history" in his efforts to save the crew of the ill–fated Karluk under Arctic explorer Vilhjalmur Stefansson.

Built in 1830 by Brigus merchant John Leamon, Hawthorne Cottage came into the Bartlett family through Bartlett's mother, Mary Leamon Bartlett, granddaughter of John Leamon. In 1834 the house was moved 10 kilometers from its original site in Cochranedale to its current location in the centre of Brigus. In the neighborhood is a house that was known as the Benville Tearooms, once operated by Bartlett's mother and sisters.

The cottage combines features of Newfoundland vernacular architecture enhanced by intricate architectural details. The architecture of Hawthorne has been recognized by the national Historic Sites and Monuments Board as typifying the refined lifestyle of Newfoundland outport merchant families of the 19th and early 20th centuries. It was designated a National Historic Site in 1978, and has been a Federal Heritage Building since 1993. The Historic Sites Association of Newfoundland and Labrador ran a small gift shop inside, which has closed.

== See also ==
- List of communities in Newfoundland and Labrador
- List of people of Newfoundland and Labrador
