= Brigus =

- Town
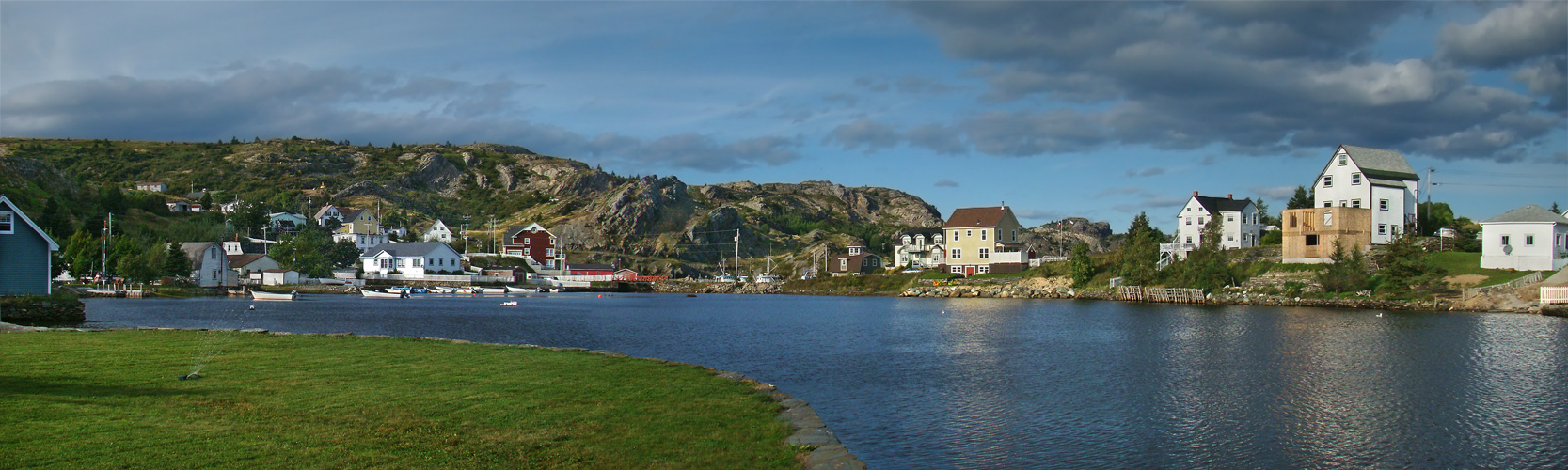

- Coat of arms

- Location of Brigus in Newfoundland
- Coordinates: 47°32′06″N 53°12′29″W
- Country: Canada
- Province: Newfoundland and Labrador
- Census division: 1
- Settled: 1612
- Incorporated (town): July 21, 1964

Government
  - Mayor: Shears Mercer Jr.
  - MHA: Helen Conway-Ottenheimer (Harbour Main)
  - MP: Paul Connors (Avalon)

Area
  - Total: 11.57 km^{2} (4.47 sq mi)
- Elevation: 30 m (98 ft)

Population (2021)
  - Total: 699
  - Density: 62.5/km^{2} (162/sq mi)
- Time zone: UTC-3:30 (Newfoundland Standard)
  - Summer (DST): UTC-2:30 (Newfoundland Daylight)
- Postal code span: A0A-1K0
- Area code: 709
- Highways: Route 60
- Website: brigus.net
- Brigus Lighthouse
- Constructed: 1885
- Foundation: concrete base
- Construction: cast iron tower
- Height: 9 m (30 ft)
- Shape: cylindrical tower with balcony and lantern
- Markings: tower painted with red and white vertical stripes
- Operator: Canadian Coast Guard
- Focal height: 34 m (112 ft)
- Range: 8 nmi (15 km; 9.2 mi)
- Characteristic: Fl W 3s

Brigus is a small fishing community located in Conception Bay, Newfoundland and Labrador, Canada. Brigus was home to Captain Bob Bartlett and the location of his residence Hawthorne Cottage.

Brigus was incorporated in July 1964. Its first mayor was Fred Bartlett. The current mayor is Shears Mercer Jr. Rev. R. Wells was the first clergy mayor elected in the province.

== Geography ==
Located in a sheltered bay, it has been home to many fishermen and a strategic location in early times. Brigus is located adjacent to Cuper's Cove (modern day Cupids), an English settlement established in 1610 by John Guy on behalf of Bristol's Society of Merchant Venturers.

Brigus is located approximately 80 km west of St. John's, and is accessible via Route 70-A just 18 km from the Trans Canada Highway (TCH).

== Demographics ==
In the 2021 Census of Population conducted by Statistics Canada, Brigus had a population of 699 living in 327 of its 506 total private dwellings, a change of −3.3% from its 2016 population of 723. With a land area of 11.48 km^{2} (4.43 sq mi), it had a population density of 60.9/km^{2} (157.7/sq mi) in 2021.

2016 Census
Total Population	723
Population change from 2011	-3.6%
Median age	51.3
Number of families	240
Number of married couples	175
Total number of dwellings	446
Land Area (km^{2}.)	11.57

== History ==
The name Brigus comes from the Brickhouse which was the name of an old town in England. Brigus's history dates back to around 1612, when John Guy sold half of the harbour to the Spracklin family. At this time Brigus was mostly settled by people from England, Ireland, and Wales. During King William's War, this village was raided in the Avalon Peninsula Campaign.

Brigus is famous for its sea captains. It was in 1819 when Captain William Munden built the schooner Four Brothers, the first one hundred ton schooner in Newfoundland (built 1819).

There were many "Arctic Heroes" that came from this historic town:

- Captain John Bartlett sailed with the American explorer Isaac Israel Hayes and also with Admiral Robert Peary
- Captain Sam Bartlett who sailed with Peary
- Captain Robert Bartlett who was in charge of the S.S. Roosevelt when Peary reached the North Pole, who later survived the wreck of the Karluk, and who later helmed the schooner Effie M. Morrissey
- Captain Arthur Bartlett
- Captain William Norman who rescued Admiral Adolphus Greely
- Captain Isaac Bartlett who rescued Captain Tyson and crew after drifting on an iceberg for 1500 miles
- Captain William Bartlett, known as "the Commodore of the sealing fleet in Newfoundland".

The HGTV Canada series Rock Solid Builds, centring on home renovations in the Brigus area by contractor Randy Spracklin, premiered in 2021.

=== Attractions ===
Brigus is a popular tourist stop, renowned for its scenic qualities and places of interest. Among these are the site of The Vindicator, where the Brigus newspaper was printed at the turn of the 20th century; the Convent of Mercy, built in 1860 for the Mercy Sisters who came from Ireland in 1861; the local Orange Lodge; Hawthorne Cottage National Historic Site; "The Tunnel" bored through solid rock on the waterfront in 1860 to provide access to a deep water berth for the Bartlett sailing ships; the Stone Barn Museum; Jubilee Club, the meeting place of the "Merchant Princes of Brigus" from the late 19th century to the mid-20th century; St. George' s Anglican Church, consecrated in 1845; Brigus United Church, dedicated in 1875 on the site of an earlier church; and the Roman Catholic Church, built in 1832.

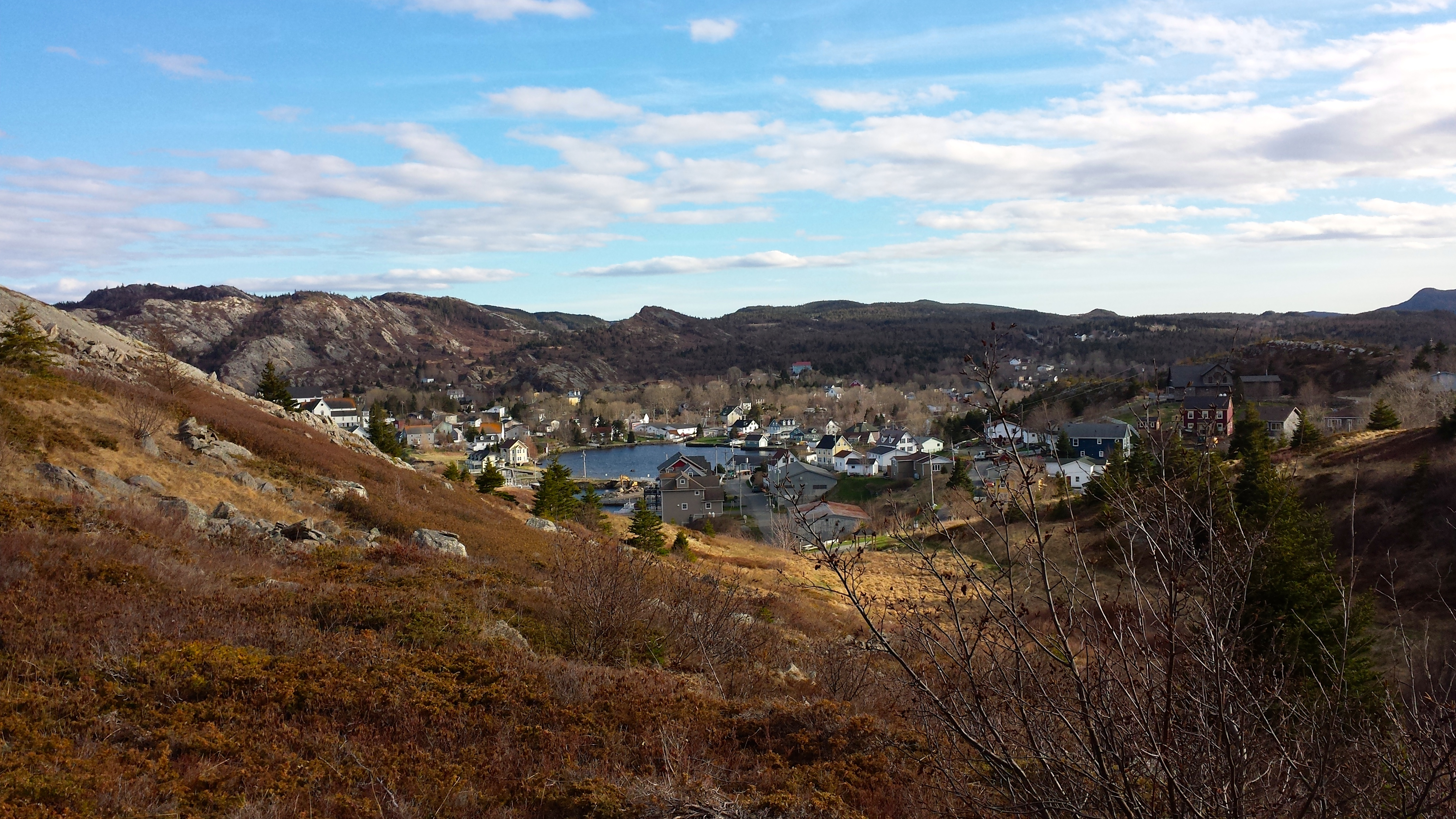
Lookout over the town of Brigus, located on the Avalon Peninsula in Newfoundland and Labrador

== See also ==
- List of lighthouses in Canada
- List of communities in Newfoundland and Labrador
