= Peary–MacMillan Arctic Museum =

Arctic studies museum in Brunswick, Maine

Coordinates: 43°54′27″N 69°57′48″W

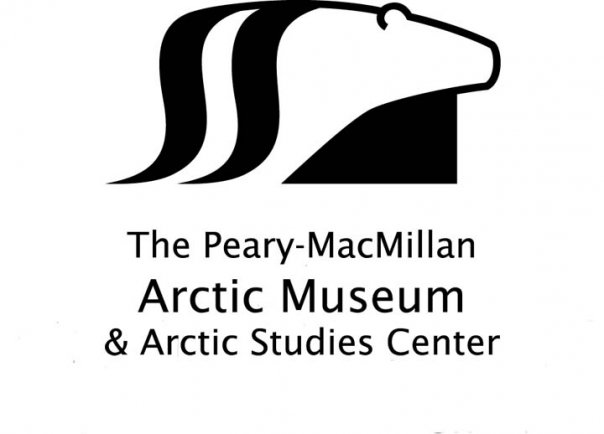
- Established: 1967
- Location: 10 Polar Loop, Brunswick, Maine 04011
- Type: Arctic Studies
- Director: Susan A. Kaplan
- Curator: Genny LeMoine
- Owner: Bowdoin College
- Website: bowdoin.edu/arctic-museum

The Peary–MacMillan Arctic Museum is a museum located in the John and Lile Gibbons Center for Arctic Studies at Bowdoin College in Brunswick, Maine. Named after Arctic explorers and Bowdoin College graduates Robert E. Peary (Class of 1877) and Donald B. MacMillan (Class of 1898), it is the only museum in the lower 48 states of the United States dedicated entirely to Arctic Studies. It opened its doors in 1967.

== History ==
Bowdoin College’s historic relationship with the Arctic dates back to 1860, when a group of Bowdoin students accompanied professor Paul Chadbourne on a research expedition to Labrador and West Greenland. Peary and MacMillan made many trips to the Arctic, together and separately. Bowdoin students also accompanied MacMillan on expeditions in the early-to-mid-20th century. Bowdoin faculty and students continue to take research trips to the Arctic, including a summer 2023 voyage to Labrador aboard the Bowdoin.

The Peary–MacMillan Arctic Museum was made possible because of donations from the Class of 1925, George B. Knox (Class of 1929), and other alumni and supporters. The museum was dedicated in June 1967, with both MacMillan and Peary's daughter, Marie Ahnighito Peary, in attendance. It was located on the first floor of Hubbard Hall, which was named in honor of Arctic exploration enthusiast Thomas Hamlin Hubbard.

Established in 1985, the Arctic Studies Center links the resources of the museum and the college library with teaching and research efforts, hosting lectures, workshops, and educational outreach projects. The museum and the Arctic Studies program are "aimed at increasing our understanding and appreciation of the workings of Arctic and North Atlantic climatic, environmental, and social systems and their interrelationships."

The Arctic Museum is located in the John and Lile Gibbons Center for Arctic Studies, which opened in 2023. The Center was Maine's first commercial building to use state-of-the-art and environmentally sustainable mass timber frame construction. The 16,000-square-foot building houses two floors of exhibition space along with storage, labs, a classroom, staff offices, and the Arctic Studies Program. The museum is free and open to the public. Between May and December 2023, the museum set a new record by welcoming 15,910 visitors through its doors.

== Collections ==
Donald and Miriam MacMillan donated the core of the collection when the Arctic Museum was founded in 1967. The collection contains more than 41,000 objects, photographs, and films. Artifacts include Peary and MacMillan's expedition equipment, over 9,000 films, anthropological objects, archival papers, publications, natural history specimens, and Alaskan and Canadian Inuit art. In the 1990s and 2000s the museum expanded its holdings of contemporary Inuit art. The museum's rotating exhibitions address diverse aspects of the Arctic, ranging from natural life, such as plants and animals, to cultural life of people native to the Arctic region.

== Academic program ==
Bowdoin offers an interdisciplinary undergraduate program in Arctic Studies. The program provides students with opportunities to explore cultural, social, and environmental issues involving Arctic and northern lands and peoples. Susan A. Kaplan, a Bowdoin professor of anthropology, serves as director of the Peary–MacMillan Arctic Museum and Arctic Studies Center.

== Collection highlights ==
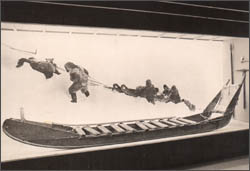
Admiral Robert Peary's North Pole Expedition sledge

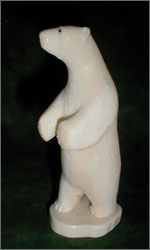
Hand-carved, ivory polar bear statue

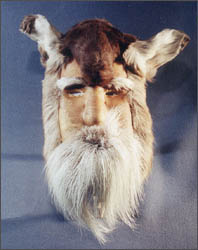
Mask with tea-stained caribou skin and animal fur

== See also ==
- Jensen Arctic Museum
- List of museums in Alaska
- List of museums (section Norway)
