= William Hand (yacht designer) =

American yacht designer

William H. Hand Jr. (1875–1946) was an American yacht designer. Hand has been described as one of the most prolific yacht designers of the 20th century with an exceptionally good eye for handsome boats. Hand's career began around 1900 with the design of small sailboats, but he soon shifted to V-bottomed powerboats. These latter were his specialty until after World War I, when he directed his talent to seakindly schooners including the famous examples Bowdoin and S.S.S. Lotus. Later during the 1930s, motorsailers became his passion; examples still sailing include 56' STEADFAST (a ketch) built at Wheeler Shipyard in Brooklyn, NY. Hand's office was in Fairhaven, Massachusetts. Advertisements in The Rudder and Motorboat magazines, as well as MIT archives indicate he did business in New Bedford, Massachusetts prior to Fairhaven but moved offices due to the hurricanes of 1938.

The New England Hurricane of 1938 and accompanying tidal surge damaged or destroyed a good deal of Hand's design work and records. Hand's surviving drawings are at the Hart Nautical Collections, MIT Museum in Cambridge, Massachusetts.

== Existing examples ==
- Nathaniel Bowditch, schooner
- Bowdoin, Arctic schooner
- June Adair schooner
- Lotus
- STEADFAST Motorsailer Ketch
- Zodiac, schooner
- Hindu schooner. Currently in Key West, Florida
- Elsita
- William Hand
- Noreaster, motorsailer
- Maramel, schooner

== Tasmanian One-Design ==
- See Tasmanian One Design class of Australia.
