= Bowdoin (Arctic schooner) =

US historic schooner built in 1921

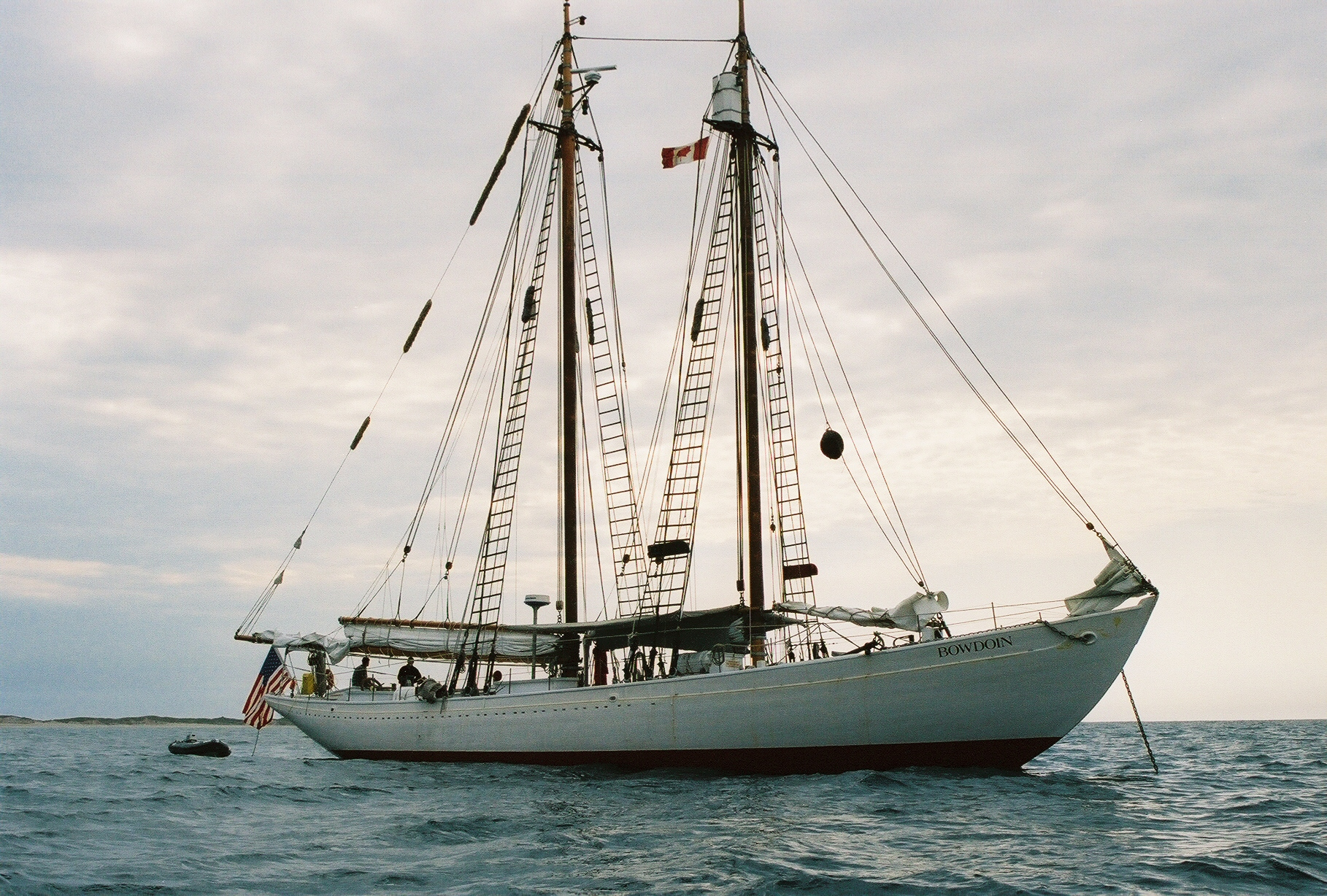
- Bowdoin at anchor off Sable Island, Nova Scotia

History
- Owner: Donald B. MacMillan; U.S. Navy 22 May 1941 – 24 January 1945; MacMillan 1945–1959; Mystic Seaport 1959–1967; Schooner Bowdoin Association, Inc. 1967 – 1988; Maine Maritime Academy c. 1988–
- Builder: William H. Hand, Jr. (designer); Hodgdon Brothers Shipyard
- Launched: 1921
- Commissioned: 16 June 1941 as IX-50
- Decommissioned: 16 December 1943
- Stricken: 14 May 1944
- Identification: MMSI number: 303498000; Callsign: WAM8653

General characteristics
- Tonnage: 66 GRT
- Length: 72 ft (22 m) LWL; 88 ft (27 m) LOA
- Beam: 21 ft (6.4 m)
- Draft: 10 ft (3.0 m)
- Sail plan: Gaff-rigged Schooner
- Bowdoin (Arctic Exploration Schooner)
- U.S. National Register of Historic Places
- U.S. National Historic Landmark
- Location within Maine Location within the United States
- Location: Castine, Maine
- Coordinates: 44°23′12″N 68°47′48″W
- Built: 1921
- Architect: Hodgdon Brothers; William H. Hand, Jr.
- NRHP reference No.: 80000411

Significant dates
- Added to NRHP: 12 February 1980
- Designated NHL: 20 December 1989

Bowdoin /ˈboʊdɪn/ is a historic schooner built in 1921 in East Boothbay, Maine, at the Hodgdon Brothers Shipyard. Designed by William H. Hand Jr. under the direction of explorer Donald B. MacMillan, the gaff-rigged vessel is the only American schooner built specifically for Arctic exploration. She has made 30 trips above the Arctic Circle in her life, three since she was acquired by the Maine Maritime Academy as a sail training ship in 1988. She is currently owned by the academy, located in Castine, Maine, and is named for Bowdoin College.

== History ==
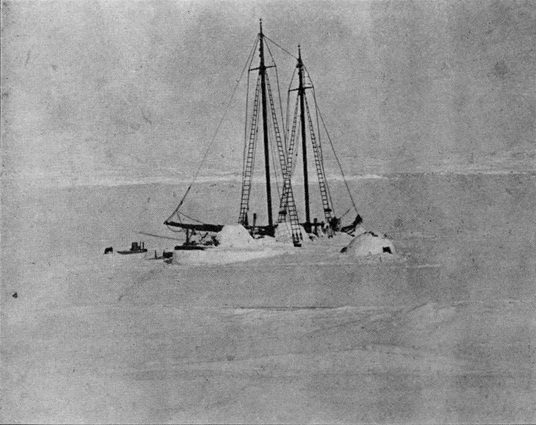
Bowdoin (with igloo habitats) frozen in Arctic ice (1923)

The schooner's design and construction were carefully considered and well-executed, although neither was radical for their day.

Bowdoin first crossed the Arctic Circle on 23 August 1921. A place unknown to most of the world, the Arctic had had few visitors. Only sixteen years before, the goal of many generations of Arctic explorers had been reached when a northwest passage was traversed – a route which was, practically speaking, unusable, and after the construction of the Panama Canal, no longer necessary. Peary's North Pole expedition was merely a dozen years past. The last few Hudson's Bay and Davis Strait whalers had made their final trip home two years before.

Bowdoin sailed north with Macmillan two dozen times, carrying scientists, adventurers, and students.

== World War II ==
On 22 May 1941 the United States Navy purchased Bowdoin from MacMillan for use during the war. She was placed in commission as USS Bowdoin (IX-50) on 16 June 1941. She was one of the very few sail powered vessels commissioned in the U.S. Navy during World War II. Her first commanding officer was her previous owner, Lieutenant Commander Donald B. MacMillan. (MacMillan had received a commission in the Naval Reserve in 1925 and was retired for age in 1938 but volunteered for active duty in 1941 at the age of 66.) MacMillan was soon reassigned to the Navy's hydrographic office. As of 1 March 1942, her commanding officer was Lieutenant (junior grade) Stuart T. Hotchkiss.

Bowdoin was assigned to the South Greenland Patrol but did not report for duty at Ivigtut. The patrol existed for two major purposes: to assist in the defense of Greenland and to support the Army in its task of setting up air bases on Greenland as stopover and fueling points for aircraft being ferried to Great Britain. Bowdoin provided services in conjunction with air base site surveys and construction. That assignment lasted about 27 months.

During that time, in October 1941, the two portions of the Greenland Patrol – the northeast and Bowdoin's south – were combined into a single command, the Greenland Patrol, Task Group 24.8 which took its orders directly from Commander in Chief, Atlantic Fleet. About two years after that event, on 23 October 1943, the auxiliary schooner was placed in reduced commission.

On 16 December 1943, Bowdoin was placed out of commission at Quincy, Massachusetts. Her name was struck from the Navy list on 16 May 1944. She was sold as a hulk on 24 January 1945 through the Maritime Commission's War Shipping Administration. Purchased by friends of MacMillan, the battered schooner was refitted once again for Arctic exploration.

== Post-war ==
In 1959, Admiral MacMillan (who was promoted to rear admiral by a special act of Congress in 1954) sailed the vessel to Mystic Seaport, in Mystic, Connecticut, and turned it over to them for display. Little was done with the ship, and the seaport removed (and broke) its masts and left it in a state of neglect.

In 1967, at MacMillan's urging, the Schooner Bowdoin Association, Inc spearheaded by Dr. Edward Morse (the last surviving member of Admiral MacMillan's arctic voyages) was formed including friends of the admiral's, former crew members and others interested in saving the ship. Mystic Seaport relinquished the schooner to the Association, which leased her to Captain Jim Sharp of Camden, Maine. Sharp restored the schooner to operating condition and sailed her to Provincetown, Massachusetts, in 1969 on a sentimental journey to MacMillan's home, where the admiral, in his 90s, saw Bowdoin sail again one last time.

Jim Sharp had restored what he could on Bowdoin for $25,000, using her as a wharfside museum in Camden, Maine and sailing her on charters. In the mid-1970s, though, U.S. Coast Guard requirements for passenger carrying, which would have called for rebuilding the schooner and destroying her historic character, forced Sharp to return Bowdoin to the Schooner Bowdoin Association. Used for sail training and leased by the Association to various groups, Bowdoin has persevered since then. A major restoration effort at the Maine Maritime Museum between 1980 and 1984 brought the schooner back to excellent condition. The work was supervised by Jim Stevens, owner of the Goudy-Stevens Yard in East Boothbay, formerly Hodgdon Brothers, who first built Bowdoin in 1921.

Bowdoin was declared the official sailing vessel of the state of Maine in 1986. In 1989 Bowdoin was designated a National Historic Landmark in recognition for her significant role in Arctic exploration.

The restored schooner sailed in OpSail '86 in New York harbor in the parade of ships that celebrated the Statue of Liberty's restoration. In 1987–1988 she was leased to Outward Bound, Inc., an educational organization, and in 1988 was turned over to the Maine Maritime Academy in Castine, Maine on a two-year lease with an option to buy.

In 1990 Bowdoin sailed to Labrador, which was her first voyage to the North since the 1950s. In 1991 she carried students for the first time since her arrival at Maine Maritime Academy, traveling 150 miles North of the Arctic Circle to Disko Island, Greenland under the command of Captain Andy Chase. She has generally remained in the area of the maritime provinces of Canada with visits to St. Pierre and Miquelon as well as Newfoundland and Labrador. She did return to the Arctic in 1994, when she sailed 250 miles North of the Arctic Circle to Umanaq, Greenland, under the command of Captain Elliot Rappaport. Bowdoin's most recent voyage north of the Arctic Circle got underway in the early summer of 2008 with Captain Richard Miller in command.

Between June and August 2014, Bowdoin was fitted with a new laminated mast after the previous mast was found to be "compromised". On 15 August 2014, Bowdoin set sail for Nova Scotia, with Captain Eric Jergenson in command.

Bowdoin returned to the Arctic Circle in June 2024, with Captain Alexander Peacock at the helm. During the eight-week voyage the vessel travelled more than 4,500 miles, crossing the 70th parallel north on 29 June 2024, before ending its voyage at Castine, Maine on 08 August 2024.

== Awards ==
For her service in the Second World War, Bowdoin is entitled to the following awards:

- American Defense Service Medal with "A" device
- American Campaign Medal
- European–African–Middle Eastern Campaign Medal
- World War II Victory Medal

== See also ==
- List of schooners
- List of National Historic Landmarks in Maine
- National Register of Historic Places listings in Hancock County, Maine
