= Ellesmere Ice Shelf =

Ice shelf in the Arctic, now broken into fragments

The Ellesmere Ice Shelf was the largest ice shelf in the Arctic, encompassing about 9,100 square kilometres (3,500 square miles) of the north coast of Ellesmere Island, Nunavut, Canada. The ice shelf was first documented by the British Arctic Expedition of 1875–76, in which Lieutenant Pelham Aldrich's party went from Cape Sheridan to Cape Alert. The continuous mass of the Ellesmere Ice Shelf had been in place for at least 3,000 years.

== History ==
During the twentieth century, the Ellesmere Ice Shelf broke up into six separate shelves. From west to east, these were the Serson Ice Shelf, Petersen Ice Shelf, Milne Ice Shelf, Ayles Ice Shelf, Ward Hunt Ice Shelf, and Markham Ice Shelf. The smaller pieces continued to disintegrate.

In April 2000, satellite images revealed that a large crack in the Ward Hunt shelf had begun to form, and in 2003 it was announced that the ice sheet had split completely in two in 2002, releasing a huge pool of freshwater from the largest epishelf lake in the Northern Hemisphere, located in Disraeli Fjord. In April 2008, scientists discovered that the shelf fractured into dozens of deep, multi-faceted cracks.

On August 13, 2005, the Ayles Ice Shelf, which was located approximately 800 km (500 mi) south of the North Pole, broke away from the coast forming the giant Ayles Ice Island 37 metres (121 ft) thick and measuring around 14 by 5 km (8.7 by 3.1 mi) in size with an area of approximately 66 km^{2} (25 sq mi) or 2.6 km^{3} (0.62 cu mi) in volume.

The Milne Ice Shelf was the second largest segment of the former Ellesmere Ice Shelf. It suffered a 40% disintegration in July 2020 with the loss of a research camp, including instruments for measuring water flow.
