= Ward Hunt Island =

Island in Nunavut, Canada

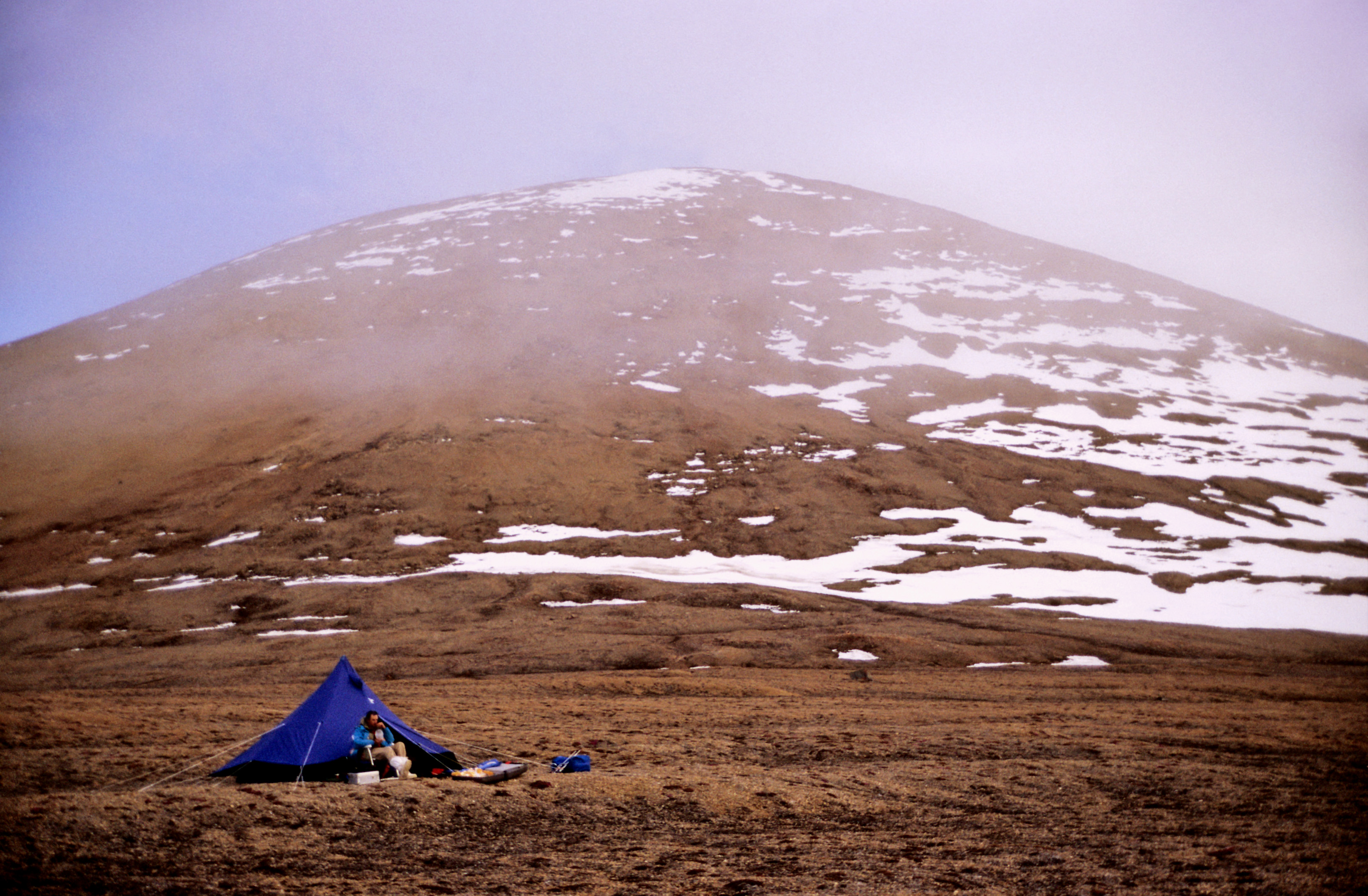
- Walker Hill (439 m (1,440 ft)) on Ward Hunt Island

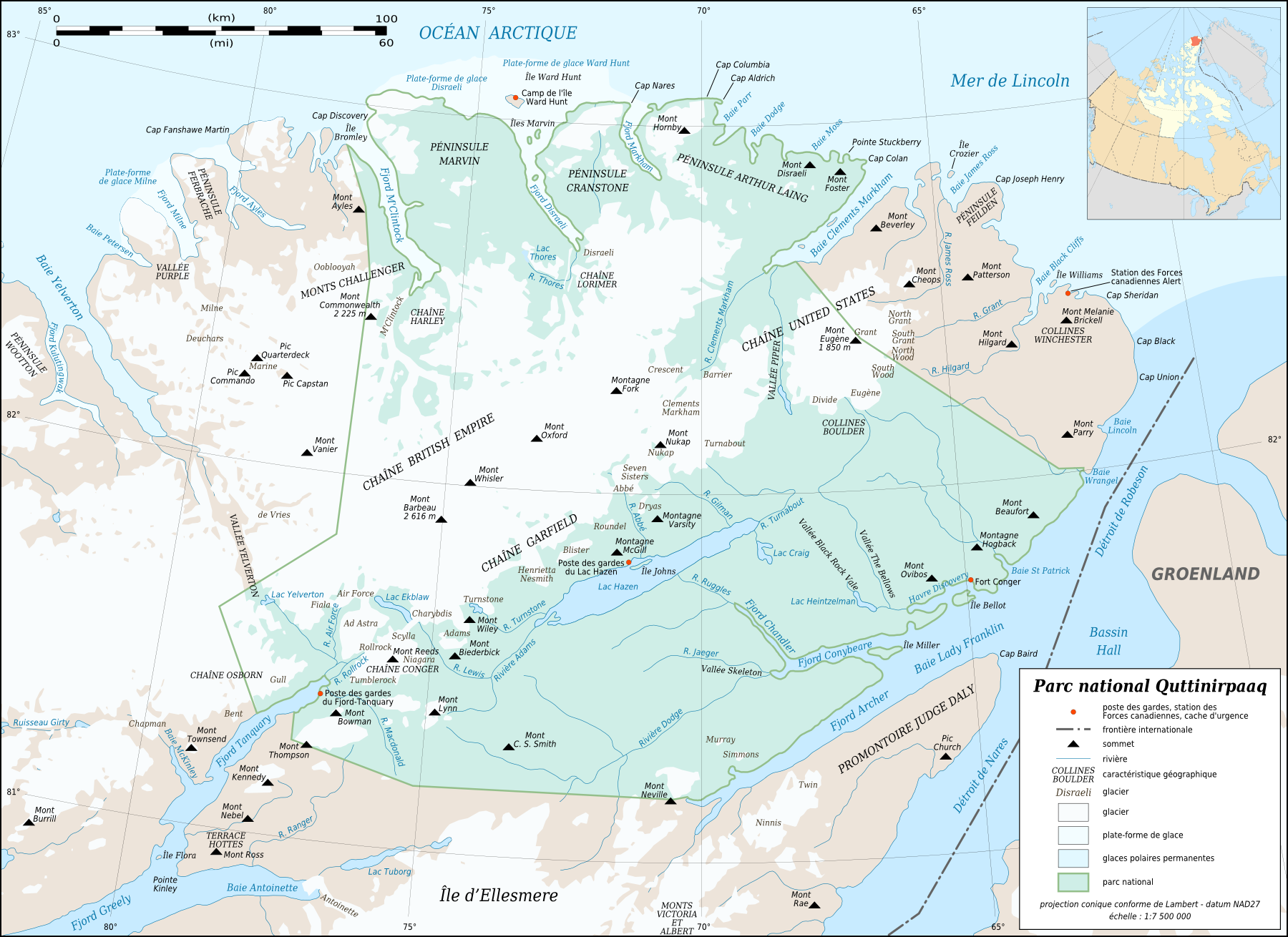

- Location within Nunavut Location within Canada

Geography
- Location: Northern Canada
- Coordinates: 83°06′N 074°10′W
- Archipelago: Queen Elizabeth Islands
- Area: 13.9 km^{2} (5.4 sq mi)
- Highest elevation: 415 m (1362 ft)
- Highest point: Walker Hill

Administration
- Canada
- Territory: Nunavut
- Region: Qikiqtaaluk

Demographics
- Population: Uninhabited

Ward Hunt Island is a small, uninhabited island in the Arctic Ocean, located off the north coast of Ellesmere Island near the Ward Hunt Ice Shelf. The island is located just 750 km (470 mi) from the geographical North Pole. The northern cape of Ward Hunt Island is one of the northernmost elements of land in Canada. Only a 17 km (11 mi) stretch of northern coast of Ellesmere Island around Cape Columbia is more northerly. The island is 5.0 km (3.1 mi) long, east to west, and 3.0 km (1.9 mi) wide. The first known sighting was in 1876 by Pelham Aldrich, a lieutenant with the George Nares expedition, and named for George Ward Hunt, who was First Lord of the Admiralty at the time (1874–1877). Today, the Island is part of the Quttinirpaaq National Park.

== History and research ==
Due to its location, the island has been used as the starting point for a number of attempts to reach the North Pole, e.g. Ralph Plaisted and others. During the International Geophysical Year of 1957–58, it was briefly used as a meteorological station. In 1959 the Canadian Defence Research Board established a research station on the island which remained in operation until the late 1960s. There is an airstrip for STOL aircraft, primarily Twin Otter, on the north coast of the island. Nearby are a few old shelters from the former Ward Hunt Island Camp station, now operated by Parks Canada.

In July 1988, a team of geodesists from the Karlsruhe Institute of Technology (KIT Karlsruhe) and geographers from the University of Giessen carried out an accurate geodetical and geomorphological survey of the island and the Ice Shelf. This enabled the compilation of the first topographic map at the scale 1: 25,000 and an additional geomorphological map (scale 1:12,500).

Since 1998, a modern research station owned and operated by the Centre d'Études Nordiques (CEN: Centre for northern studies) of Laval University, Quebec and Parks Canada also exists on the north coast with an automatic climatic station open all year round. In addition to accommodation, the CEN base camp also has a small laboratory for the multidisciplinary fieldwork carried out during the three summer months. The data obtained on the climate, flora and fauna cover a period of more than 20 years and have been accessible since the beginning of the measurements.

This region at the northern land limit of the Canadian Arctic is currently undergoing major environmental changes. On 29 July 2008, a giant chunk of ice broke away from the Ward Hunt Ice Shelf. The new ice island had an area of 35.9 km^{2} (13.9 sq mi). It was the largest fracture of its kind since the nearby Ayles Ice Shelf—which measured 66 km^{2} (25 sq mi)—broke away in 2005.

In July 2016, a team of scientists with the Canadian Armed Forces while conducting a site visit of Eureka, Tanquary Fiord, and Ward Hunt Island found a cairn erected in 1975 by then Prime Minister, Pierre Trudeau, who had been accompanied by two of his sons, Justin and Alexandre Trudeau. A picture of the plaque was presented in 2017 to then Prime Minister Justin Trudeau by Defence Minister Harjit Sajjan on behalf of the Canadian Armed Forces.

== Gallery ==
Ward Hunt Island
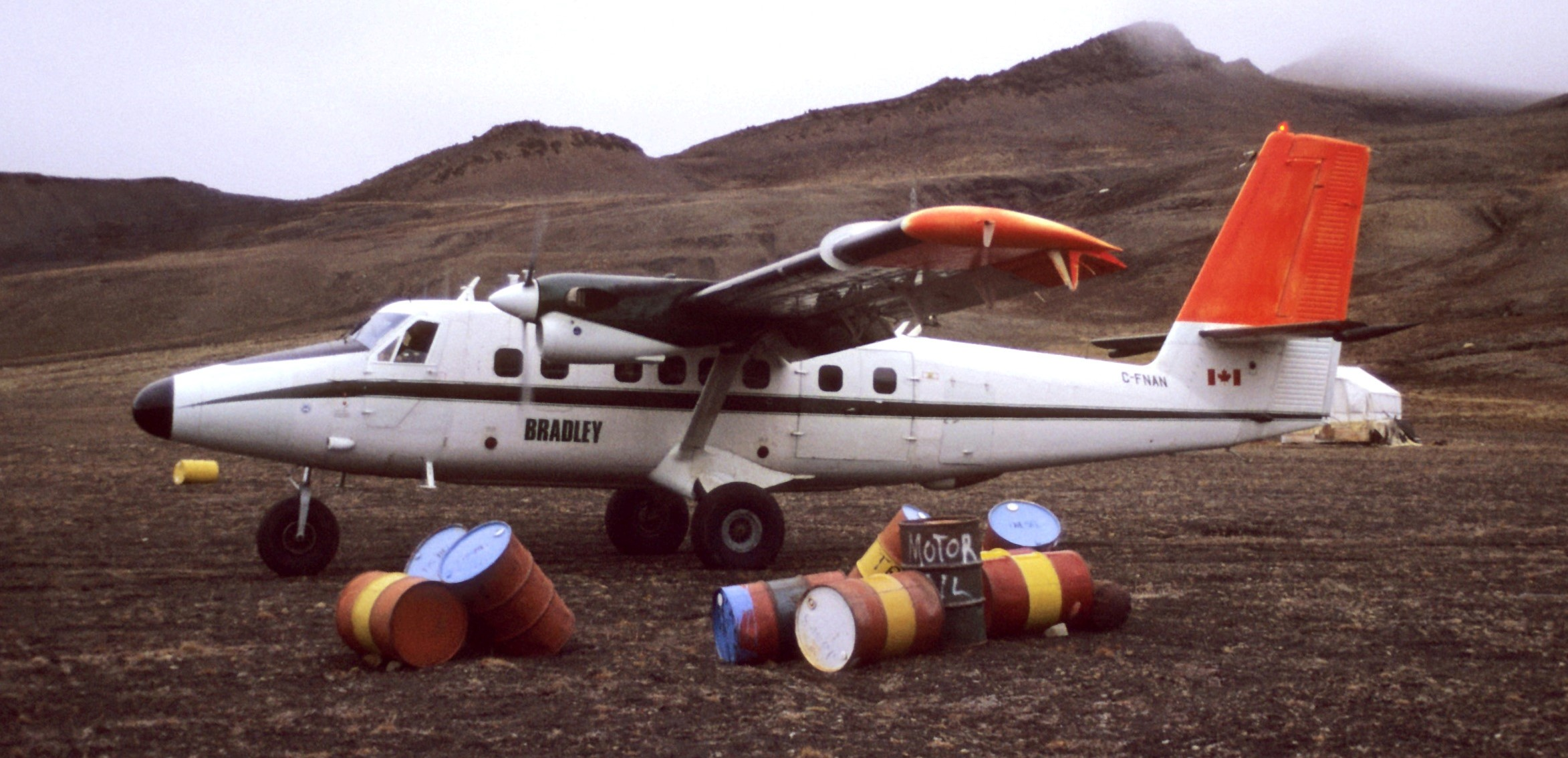
Twin Otter STOL plane by Bradley Air Services on Ward Hunt Island in 1988

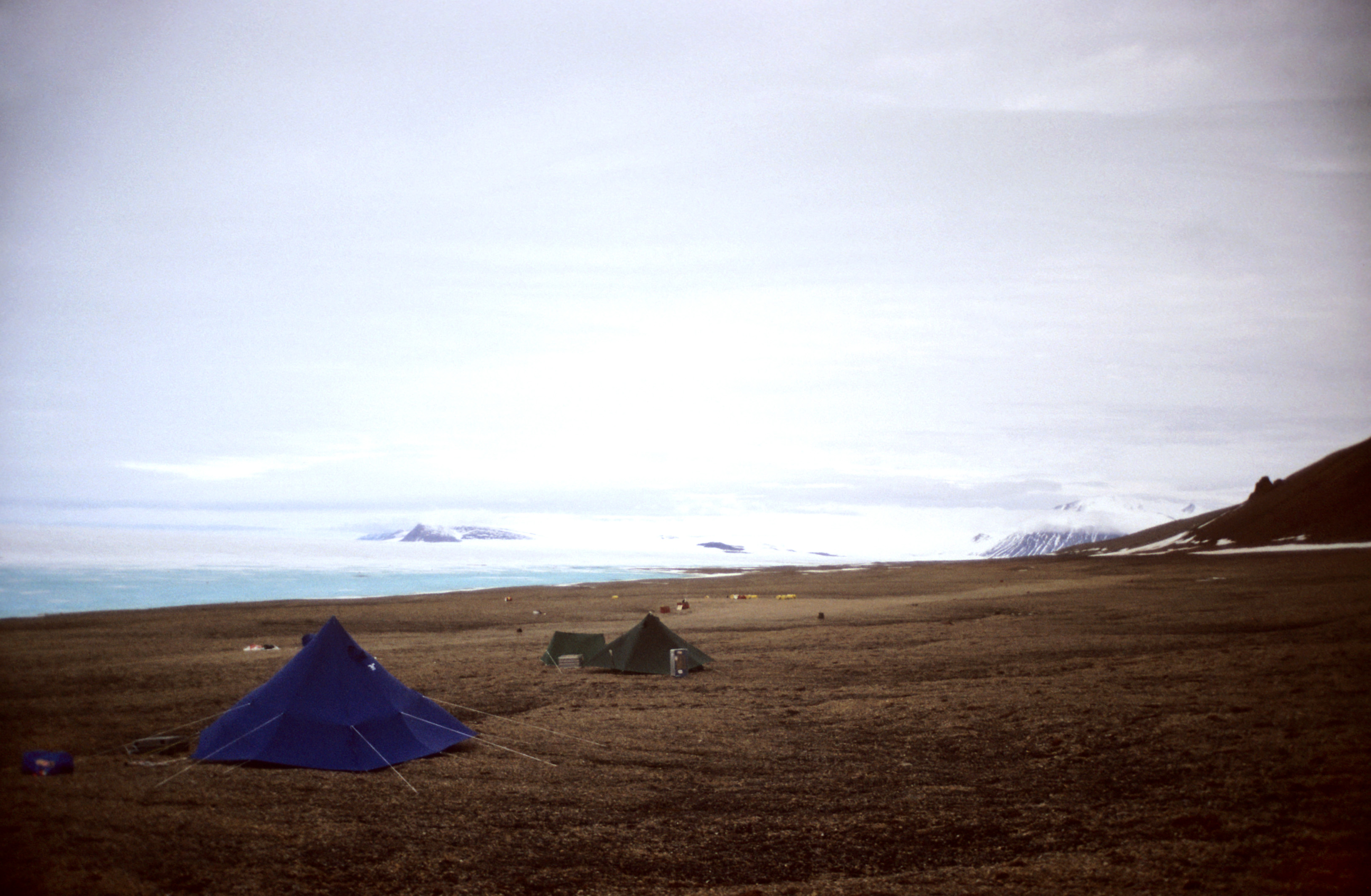
Ward Hunt Island, field camp and airstrip, view towards Cape Columbia, Ellesmere Island, Canada

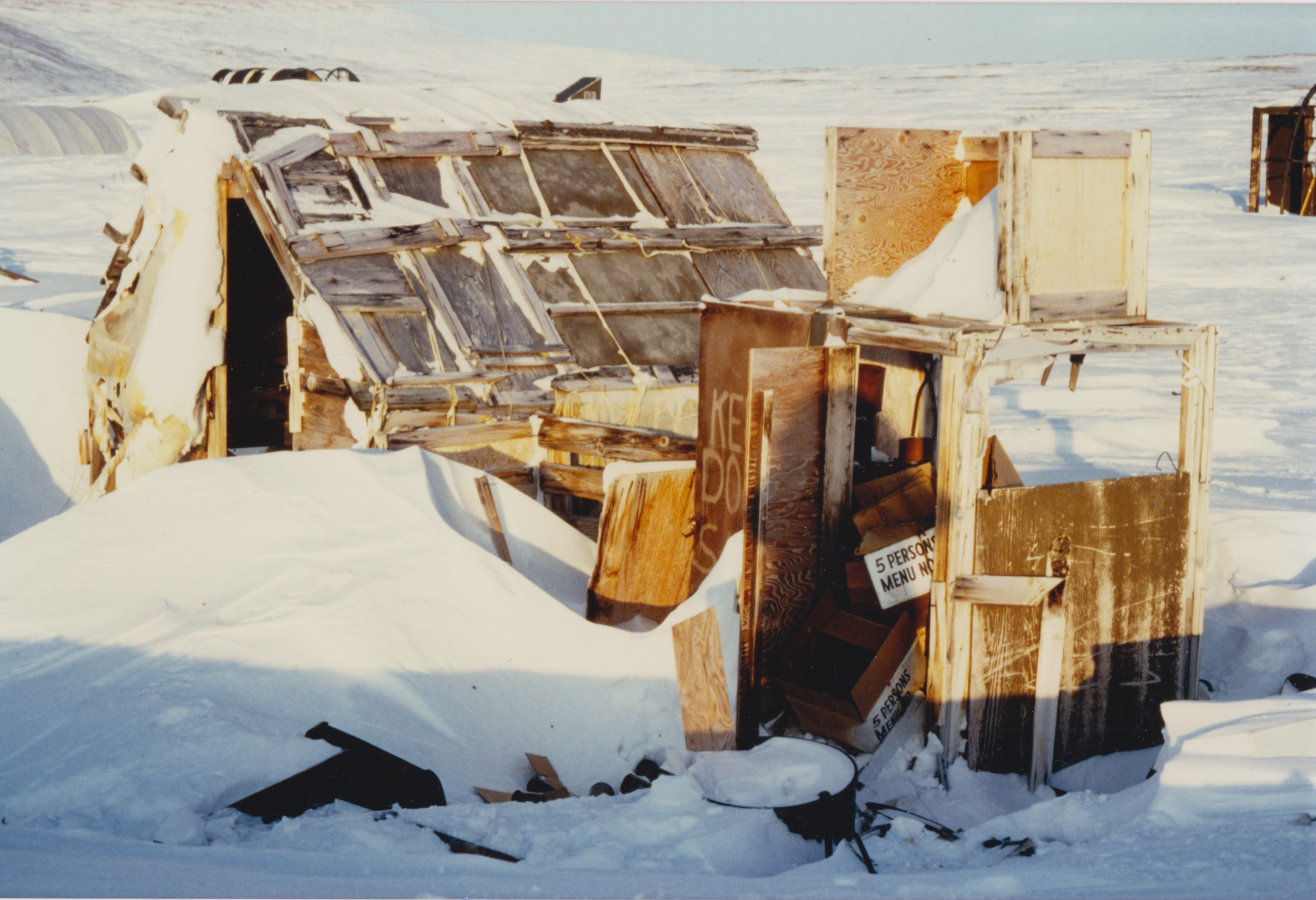
The old Ward Hunt Island Camp of the CDRB used in the 1960s

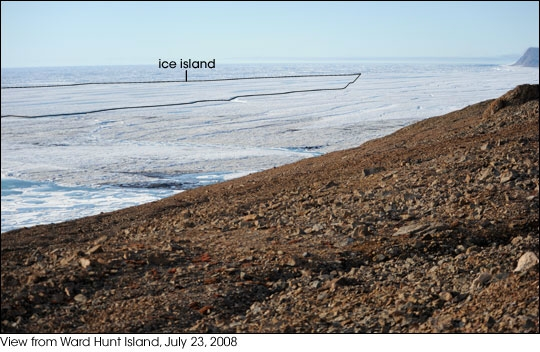
North coast of Ward Hunt Island, looking to grounded iceberg ("ice island"), 23 July 2008, shows a crack (outline added) in the Ward Hunt Ice Shelf

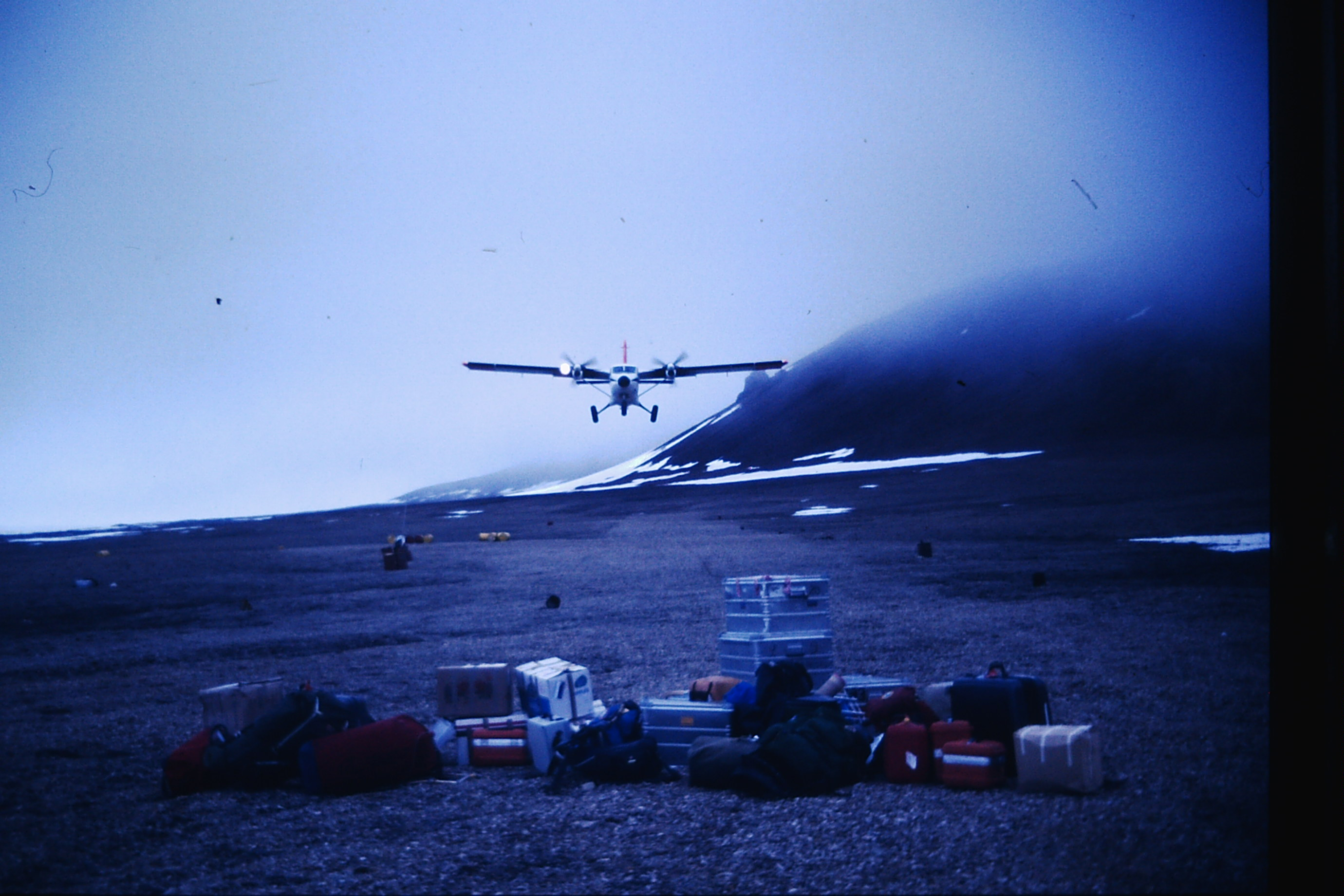
Start of Twin Otter on Ward Hunt Island airstrip

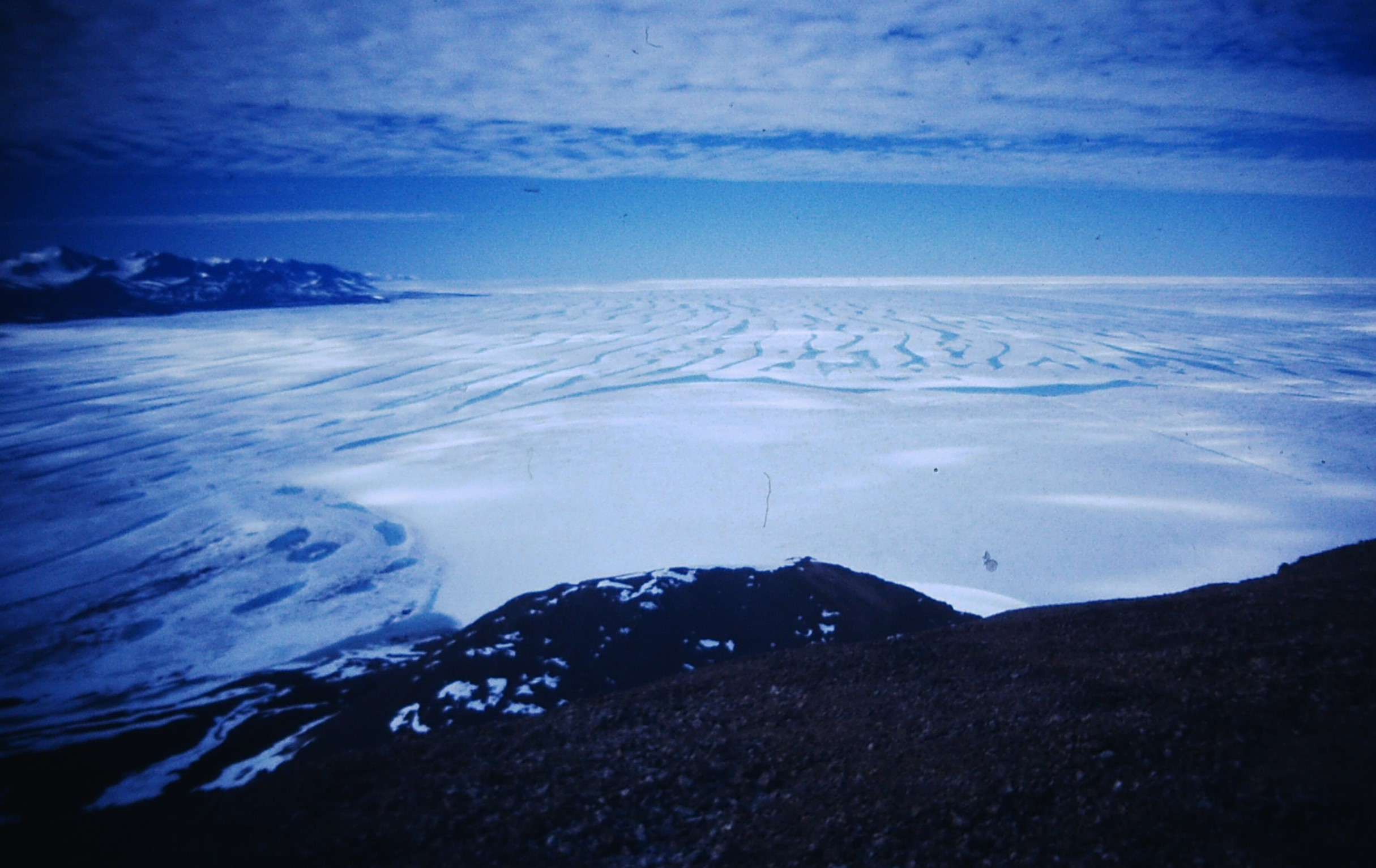
Ward Hunt Ice-Shelf in 1988, view towards west with coast of Northern Ellesmere Island
