= Ward Hunt Ice Shelf =

Ice shelf in the Arctic Ocean

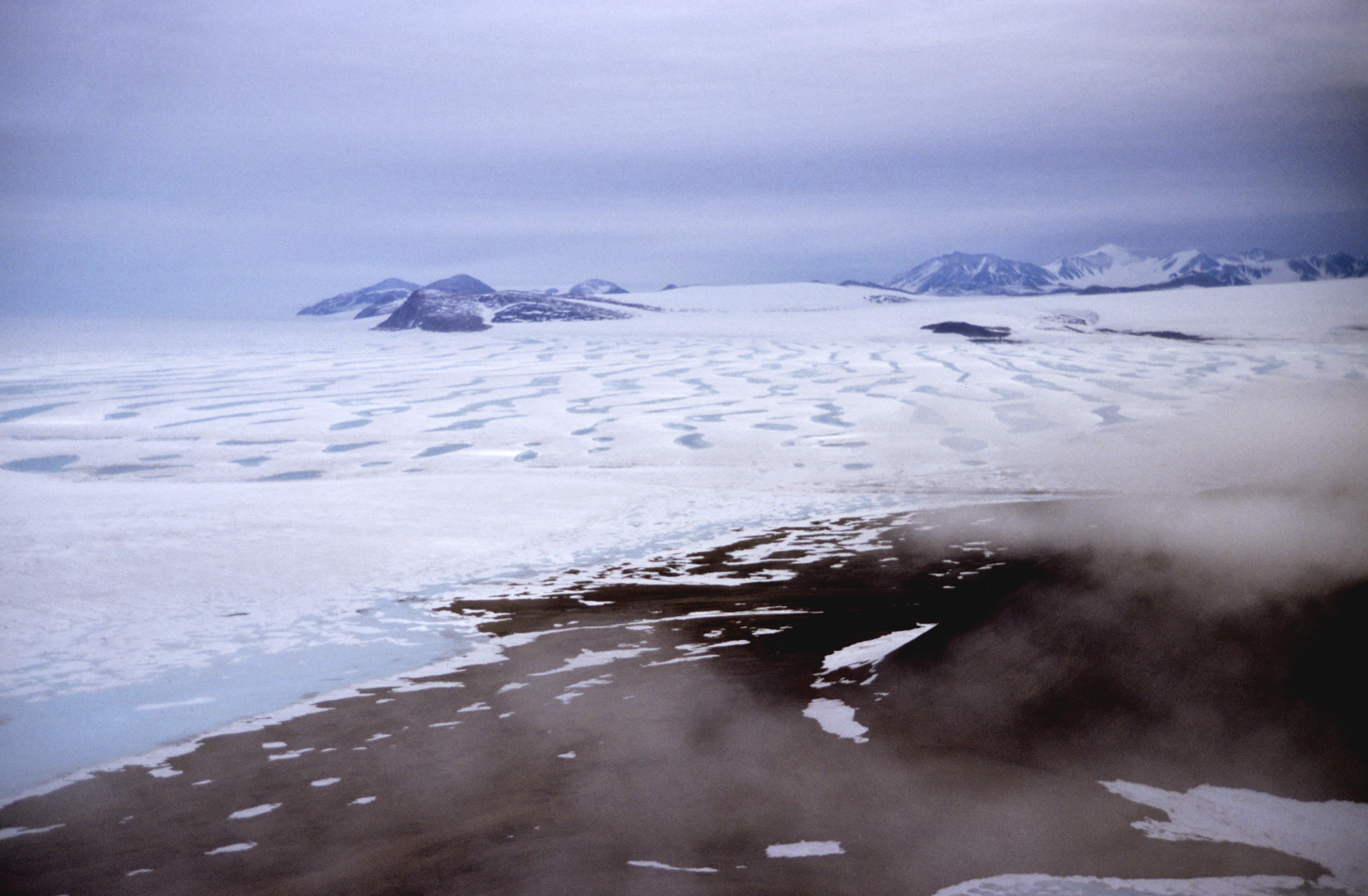
Ward Hunt Island, Ward Hunt Ice Shelf and Cape Columbia, Ellesmere Island, Canada. View towards east.

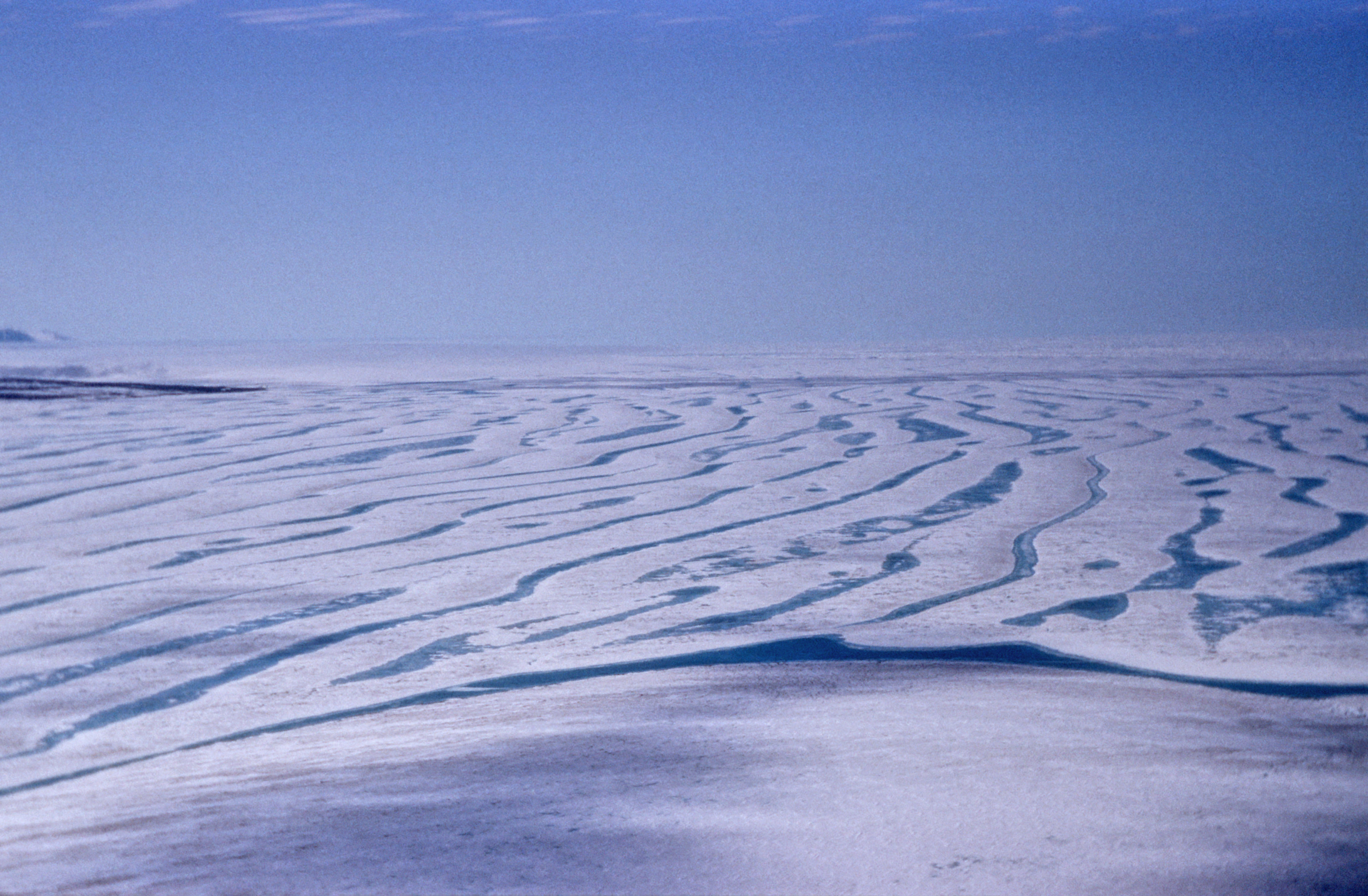
Ward Hunt Ice Shelf, north of Ellesmere Island, Canada. View from Ward Hunt Ice Rise towards west, July 1988.

The Ward Hunt Ice Shelf is the largest ice shelf in the Arctic, located near Ward Hunt Island, on the north coast of Ellesmere Island, Nunavut, Canada. During the 20th century the Ellesmere Ice Shelf broke up into six separate shelves, the largest being Ward Hunt. Ward Hunt Ice Shelf is currently about 400 km^{2} (150 sq mi) in size, and has been in place for approximately 4,000 years as part of a continuous ice shelf that encompassed the northern coast of Ellesmere Island until the beginning of the twentieth century. In 2005 one of the other shelves, the 65 km^{2} (25 sq mi) Ayles Ice Shelf, calved completely.

The Ellesmere ice shelf was documented by the British Arctic Expedition of 1875–76, in which Lieutenant Pelham Aldrich's party went from Cape Sheridan (82.47°N, 61.50°W) west to Cape Alert (82.27°N, 85.55°W), including the Ward Hunt Ice Shelf. Reports from Robert Peary's expedition in 1906 described a “broad glacial fringe” covering much of the coast of northwestern Ellesmere Island.

The Ward Hunt ice sheet began breaking up approximately 100 years ago, but was believed to have stabilized by the early 1980s. However, in April 2000, satellite images revealed that a large crack in the ice had begun to form, and in 2003, it was announced that the ice sheet had split completely in two in 2002, releasing a huge pool of fresh water from the largest epishelf lake in the Northern Hemisphere, located in Disraeli Fjord. In April 2008, it was discovered that the shelf was fractured into dozens of deep, multi-faceted cracks. In late July 2008, it was announced that nearly 21 km^{2} (8 sq mi) broke away from the shelf. In August 2010, another 50 km^{2} (19 sq mi) calved off from the northeast quarter of the ice shelf.

The icebergs released by the breakup now pose a potential danger to shipping and offshore development in the region. Loss of microbial ecosystems caused by the release of the freshwater may also have far-ranging ecological impacts.

The breakup of the Ward Hunt Ice Shelf is tied to steady and dramatic increases in the average temperature of the region over the past centuries, correlated with long term global warming resulting from the ongoing warming since the last ice age ended at the start of the Holocene period.

Al Gore mentions the Ward Hunt Ice Shelf in his 2007 documentary An Inconvenient Truth.
