= Teiș =

Teiș may refer to several villages in Romania:

- Teiș, a village in Șotânga Commune, Dâmbovița County
- Teiș, a village in Balș town, Olt County

TEIS can also refer to the Thwaites Eastern Ice Shelf, a major ice shelf in Antarctica.
