= Adam Ayles =

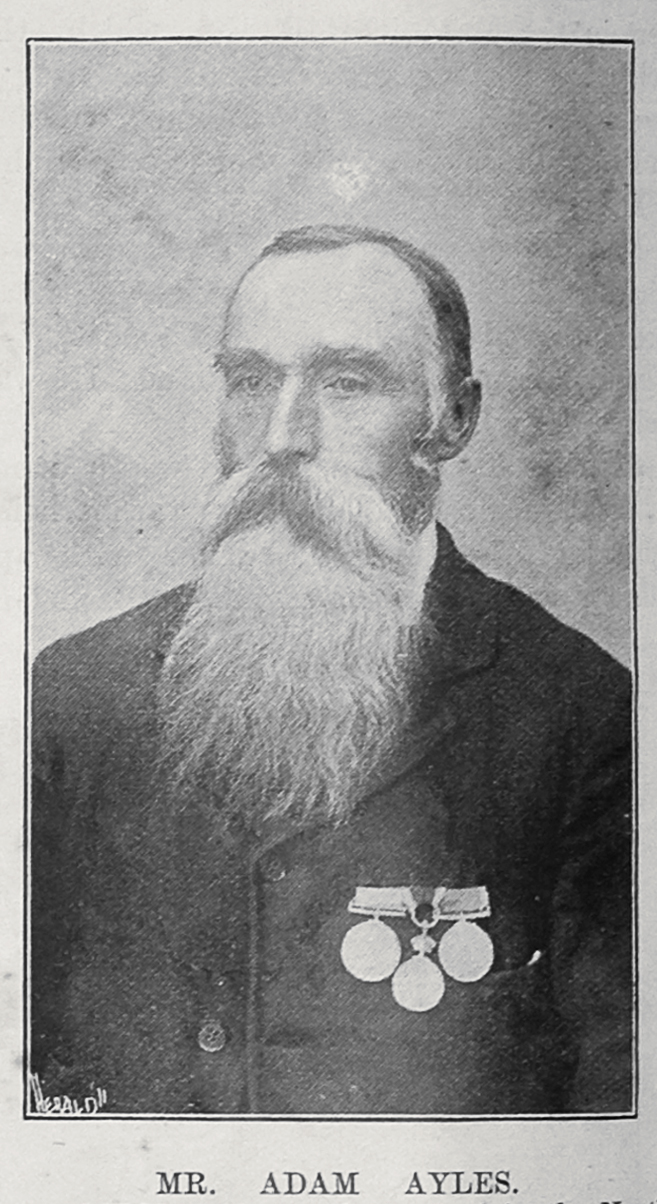
- Born: 1850; Marnhull, Dorset, England
- Died: 4 April 1912 (aged 61–62); Auckland, New Zealand
- Military career
- Allegiance: British
- Branch: Navy
- Rank: Petty Officer
- Other work: Arctic explorer

Adam Ayles (1850 – 4 April 1912) was an Arctic explorer who served under George Nares as the Petty Officer of HMS Alert in the British Arctic Expedition.

Ayles was born of an unmarried mother at Marnhull, Dorset. He left school aged twelve and worked on a farm for a few years. He joined the Royal Navy in 1867 and served in the British expedition to Abyssinia in 1868.

Ayles served on the British Arctic Expedition from 1875 to 1876. He was the one member of the expedition that did not succumb to scurvy, and walked more than 100 miles across the ice to get relief to the others. The Ayles Ice Shelf and Mount Ayles were both named after him. It was noted at the time that he was the only teetotaller on the expedition, and Punch celebrated his achievement in verse:

A health to gallant Adam Ayles,
Who o'er the topers still prevails,
From scurvy safe and Arctic gales,
Through drinking only Adam's Ales.

Ayles left the navy in 1885 and lived in Sydney for a few years, then moved to New Zealand. He lived in Carterton from 1893 to 1899, working as the town's librarian, before moving to Auckland. He died suddenly in April 1912 while at his work tending the bowling green at the Rocky Nook Bowling Club in Auckland.
