= M'Clintock Ice Shelf =

Ice shelf in the Arctic Ocean

Coordinates: 82°55′N 77°30′W

The M'Clintock Ice Shelf was a Canadian ice shelf attached to northern Ellesmere Island. By 1961/62, its connection was tenuous. Most of the shelf broke away during the period of 1963 through 1965 with the remainder (10 km^{2} lodged at Borup Point) breaking off in 1966. Subsequently, multi year landfast sea ice, containing ice shelf fragments, has covered the M’Clintock Inlet mouth.
