= Richard William Coppinger =

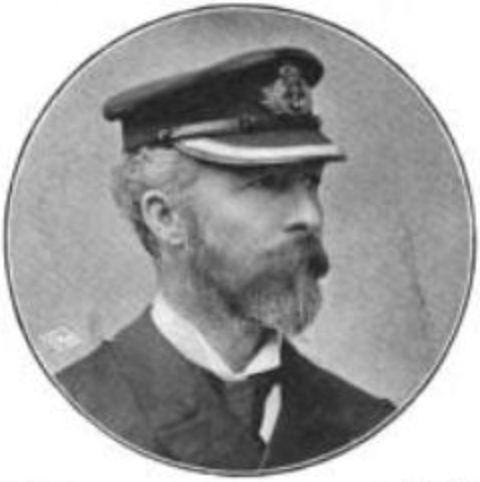
- Born: 11 October 1847; Dublin, Ireland
- Died: 2 April 1910 (aged 62); Wallington, England
- Education: Queen's University of Ireland
- Occupations: Surgeon, naturalist

Richard William Coppinger (11 October 1847 – 2 April 1910) was a British Navy surgeon and naturalist.

== Biography ==
Richard William Coppinger was born in Dublin on 11 October 1847. He graduated M.D. from the Queen's University of Ireland in 1870. He was a surgeon on HMS Alert, for the ship's Arctic expedition from 1875 to 1876 and the ship's expedition and Pacific cruise, including the Patagonian coast, Polynesia, and the Mascarene Islands, from 1878 to 1882. Whilst on HMS Alert, he collected botanical specimens from Magellan Straits landfalls, Tahiti, Fiji, Australia, the Torres Strait Islands, Singapore, and the Seychelles, in addition to extensive zoological collections. In 1889 he was appointed instructor in hygiene at the Admiralty's Royal Hospital Haslar at Gosport. In 1901 he was appointed Inspector-General of Hospitals and Ships.

He married in 1884 and had three sons and one daughter.

He died in Wallington on 2 April 1910.

== Selected publications ==
- "Some Experiments on the Conductive Properties of Ice, made in Discovery Bay, 1875–76". Proceedings of the Royal Society of London. 27: 183–189. 1878. doi:10.1098/rspl.1878.0036.
- Cruise of the "Alert.". 1883.
- Davidson, Andrew, ed. (1893). "Chapter 3. "Tropical Naval Hygiene" by R. W. Coppinger". Hygiene and Diseases of Warm Climates. pp. 81–112.
