= HMS Discovery (1874) =

19th-century British Royal Navy barque

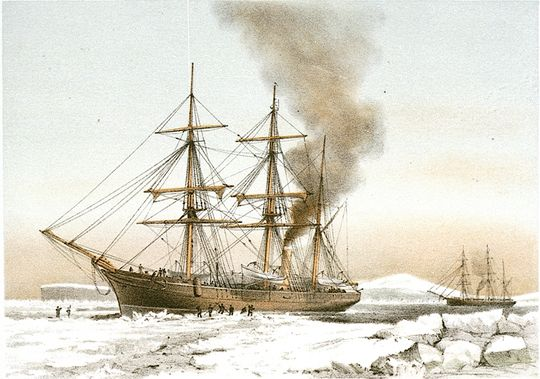
- HMS Discovery (foreground) and HMS Alert (background, right)

History

United Kingdom
- Name: Bloodhound
- Owner: 1873-1874 Walter B Grieve, Newfoundland; 1902-1907 D Murray & Son, Glasgow; 1907-1917 Murray & Crawford Ltd, Glasgow
- Builder: Alexander Stephen & Sons, Dundee
- Yard number: 53
- Launched: 2 August 1872
- Completed: April 1873

United Kingdom
- Name: HMS Discovery
- Acquired: Purchased 5 December 1874
- Commissioned: 13 April 1875
- Fate: Sold February 1902

General characteristics
- Tonnage: 1247 tons
- Length: 166 ft (51 m)
- Beam: 29 ft (8.8 m)
- Draught: 16.5 ft (5.0 m)
- Installed power: Indicated 312 hp (233 kW)
- Propulsion: Greenock Foundry Company steam engine
- Sail plan: Barque-rigged
- Complement: 60

HMS Discovery was a wood-hulled screw expedition ship, and later storeship, formerly the sealing ship Bloodhound built in 1873 in Dundee. She was purchased in 1874 for the British Arctic Expedition of 1875–1876 and later served as a store ship. Discovery was sold in 1902, reverting to the name Bloodhound and her previous sealing trade. The ship was wrecked in Newfoundland in 1917.

== Design and construction ==
The steam barque Bloodhound was built as Yard No.53 in their Panmure shipyard at Dundee by Alexander Stephen & Sons for Newfoundland sealing operations. She was launched on 2 August 1872 and completed in March 1873. She measured 556 gross register tons (GRT) and 378 net register tons (NRT), and was 166.0 feet (50.6 m) in length, 29.1 feet (8.9 m) beam and 18.3 feet (5.6 m) depth. The ship was rigged as a 3-masted barque and her Greenock Foundry Company auxiliary compound steam engine generated 312 indicated horsepower and drove a single screw propeller.

== Newfoundland sealing ==
Bloodhound was launched for Bain & Johnston of Greenock, whose previous Bloodhound had recently been lost near Labrador in the ice in April 1872. She was registered on 12 March 1873 at St John's, Newfoundland in the ownership of Walter B. Grieve of that port.

== Royal Navy ==
=== British Arctic Expedition ===
In 1874, the Admiralty were seeking a suitable exploration vessel for the 1875 British Arctic Expedition, and considered Bloodhound ideally suited. She was purchased on 5 December 1874 and converted for exploration, commissioning as HMS Discovery on 13 April 1875. Captain George Strong Nares was placed in command of the 1875 British Arctic Expedition, which aimed to reach the North Pole via Smith Sound, the sea passage between Greenland and Canada's northernmost island, Ellesmere Island. Contemporary geographers proposed that there could be an Open Polar Sea, and that if the thick layer of ice surrounding it were overcome, access to the North Pole by sea might be possible. Ever since Edward Augustus Inglefield had penetrated Smith Sound in 1852, it had been a likely route to the North. Nares commanded the converted sloop HMS Alert, and with him went Discovery, commanded by Captain Henry Frederick Stephenson. HMS Valorous carried extra stores and accompanied the expedition as far as Godhavn.

Despite finding heavier-than-expected ice, the expedition pressed on. Leaving Discovery to winter at Lady Franklin Bay, Alert carried on a further 50 nautical miles (93 km; 58 mi) through the Robeson Channel, establishing her winter quarters at Floeberg Beach. Spring 1876 saw considerable activity by sledge charting the coasts of Ellesmere Island and Greenland, but scurvy had begun to take hold, with Alert suffering the greatest burden. On 3 April, the second-in-command of Alert, Albert Hastings Markham, took a party north to attempt the Pole. By 11 May, having made slow progress, they reached their greatest latitude at 83° 20' 26"N. Suffering from snow blindness, scurvy and exhaustion, they turned back.

The expedition returned to the UK in Autumn 1876 and was well rewarded; Nares was knighted, Markham was promoted to captain. The geography of northern Canada and Greenland is littered with the names of those connected with the expedition; Cape Discovery (83°01′N 77°29′W) on the northern edge of Ellesmere Island is named for the ship.

=== Storeship at Portsmouth ===
The Discovery saw no further seagoing service after her return from the Arctic. She was employed as a storeship in Portsmouth Harbour from 1880, probably up until the time of her final disposal.

== Disposal ==
Discovery was sold to D Murray in February 1902.

== Legacy ==
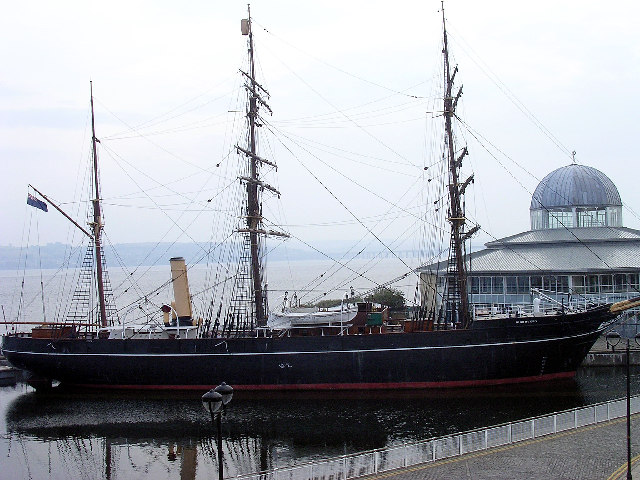
Discovery's namesake, RRS Discovery open to the public in Dundee.

The 1901 research vessel, built for the British National Antarctic Expedition (1901–1904), incorporated many of the features of Discovery, as well as taking her name. RRS Discovery was commanded by Robert Falcon Scott and took part in the Discovery Investigations from 1924 to 1931. She is now on permanent display at Dundee.

Subsequent Royal Research Ships, launched in 1929 and 1962, have also borne the name, as has Space Shuttle Discovery.

== Bibliography ==
- Narrative of a voyage to the Polar Sea during 1875–76 in H.M. ships ‘Alert’ and ‘Discovery’, by Captain George Strong Nares, in two volumes, London 1878; online book Volume 1 & Volume 2
