= Mount Ayles =

Mountain in Nunavut, Canada

- Location within Nunavut

Highest point
- Elevation: 1,060 m (3,480 ft)
- Listing: Mountains of Canada
- Coordinates: 82°43′N 77°18′W

Geography
- Location: Nunavut, Canada
- Parent range: British Empire Range
- Topo map: NTS 340E11 Mount Ayles

Mount Ayles is a mountain located on Ellesmere Island, Nunavut, Canada. It forms part of the border of the Quttinirpaaq National Park. Like the nearby Ayles Ice Shelf, the mountain was named by the Geological Survey of Canada in 1965 for Adam Ayles, a petty officer on-board HMS Alert, who was serving in the British Arctic Expedition under George Nares.
