= Alfred Ernest Ice Shelf =

Ice shelf in the Arctic Ocean

Coordinates: 82°18′N 085°56′W

Location in Nunavut

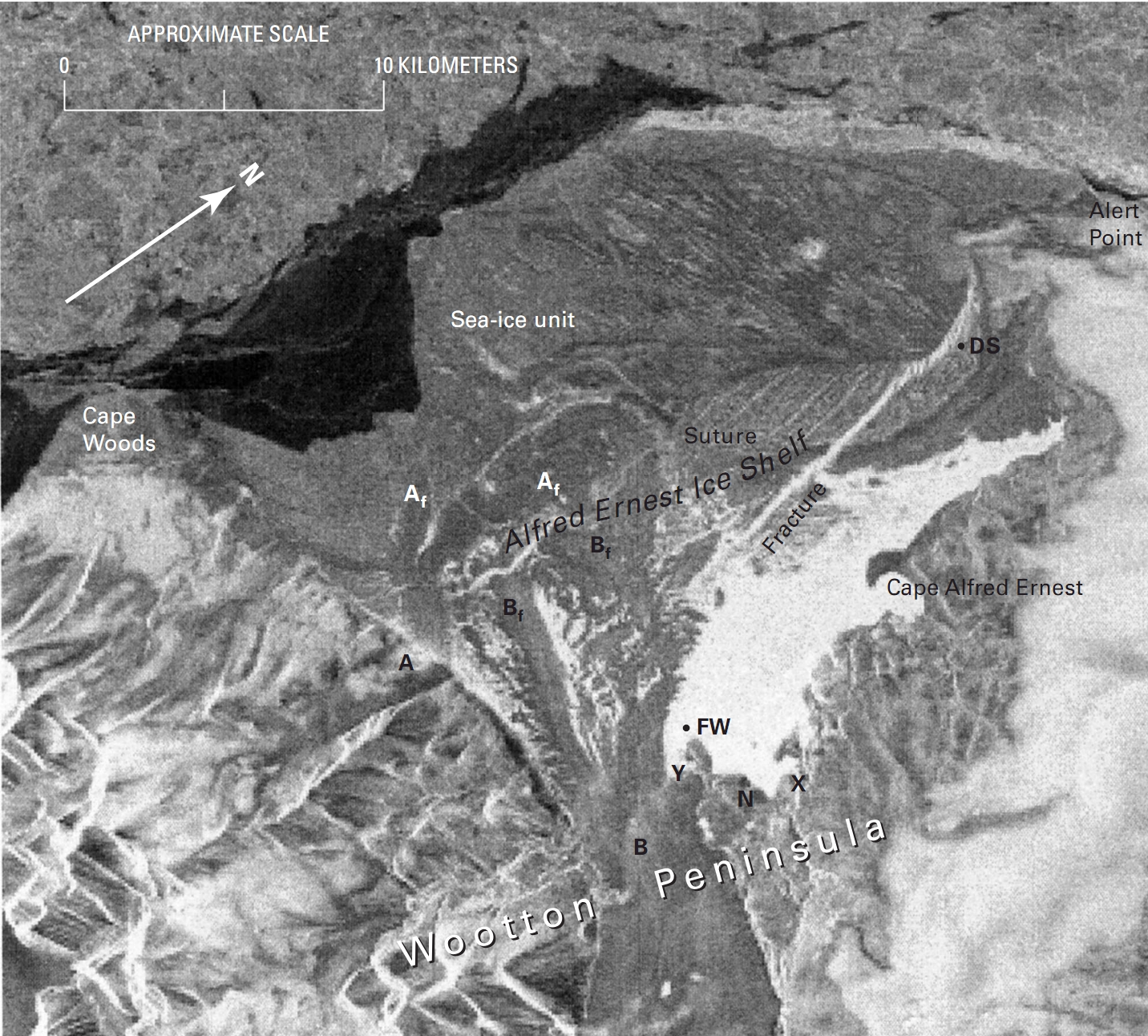
Satellite image showing of Alfred Ernest Ice Shelf

The Alfred Ernest Ice Shelf is an ice shelf on the north-west part of Ellesmere Island, Canada. This ice mass is one of four remaining ice shelves on the island.

This ice shelf lies between Alert Point and Cape Woods on the Wootton Peninsula. The Alfred Ernest Ice Shelf is regarded as a composite ice shelf that is composed of an inner unit of glacial origin and a trunk glacier originating from sea ice.

Some time around 1955, a section of the ice shelf broke off. It is now called the ARLIS-II ice island.

== See also ==
- Fletcher's Ice Island
