= Serson Ice Shelf =

Ice shelf in the Arctic Ocean

Coordinates: 82.3289°N 85.9983°W

The Serson Ice Shelf is a major ice shelf on the northern coast of Ellesmere Island in Qikiqtaaluk Region, Nunavut, Canada. It measured approximately 47 square miles (120 km^{2}) until 60 percent of it broke away in two large sections during summer 2008.
