= Thwaites Ice Shelf =

Antarctic ice shelf in the Amundsen Sea

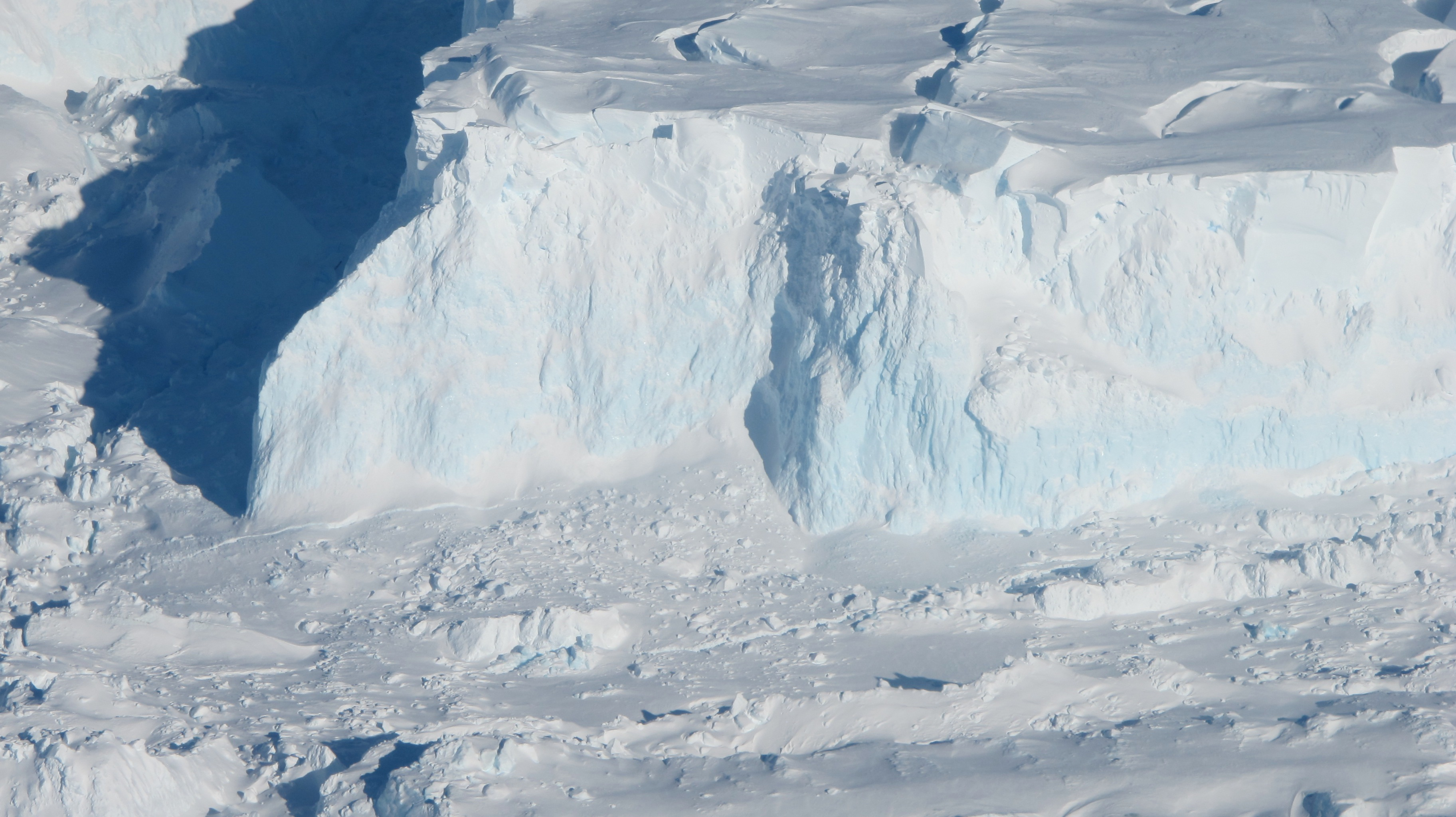
Thwaites Ice Shelf

Location in Antarctica

The Thwaites Ice Shelf (75°6′S 105°31′W), is an Antarctic ice shelf in the Amundsen Sea. It was named by ACAN after Fredrik T. Thwaites, a glacial geologist and geomorphologist. The Thwaites Ice Shelf is one of the biggest ice shelves in West Antarctica, though it is highly unstable and disintegrating rapidly. Since the 1980s, the Thwaites Glacier, nicknamed the "Doomsday Glacier", has had a net loss of over 600 billion tons of ice, though pinning of the Thwaites Ice Shelf has served to slow the process. The Thwaites Ice Shelf has acted like a dam for the eastern portion of glacier, bracing it and allowing for a slow melt rate, in contrast to the undefended western portion.

According to the American Geophysical Union in a 2021 study, the Thwaites Eastern Ice Shelf (TEIS) buttresses one-third of Thwaites Glacier. Removal of the shelf has the potential to increase the contribution of Thwaites Glacier to sea level rise by up to 25%. As of 2021, the ice shelf appears to be losing its grip on a submarine shoal that acts as a pinning point and the shear margin that separates the Thwaites Eastern Ice Shelf from the Thwaites Glacier Tongue has extended, further weakening the ice shelf connection to the pinning point.

A sequence of Sentinel-1 radar imagery shows that parallel wing and comb cracks have recently formed rifts at high angles to the main shear margin and are propagating into the central part of the ice shelf at rates as high as 2 km per year. Satellite data, ground-penetrating radar, and GPS measurements taken in 2021 indicate that collapse of the ice shelf may be initiated by intersection of rifts with hidden basal crevasse zones as soon as 2026.

Complete melting of Thwaites Glacier is predicted to increase global sea levels by 65 cm (2.13 ft) according to the European Geosciences Union, and the Cooperative Institute for Research in Environmental Sciences states that the collapse of Thwaites Glacier could ultimately lead to sea-level rise of up to 3 meters if it draws the Pine Island Glacier and surrounding glaciers with it, due to marine ice sheet instability. However, both of these processes would take time: a Science magazine interview with the International Thwaites Glacier Collaboration researchers who had discovered the impending collapse of the ice shelf noted that the glacier itself would still take approximately several centuries to collapse even without the ice shelf, and a 2022 assessment of tipping points in the climate system stated that while the West Antarctic Ice Sheet may be committed to disintegration at between 1°C and 3°C, the timescale for its collapse after that ranges between 500 and 13,000 years, with the most likely estimate of 2000 years.

== See also ==
- Ice shelves of Antarctica
