= Ayles Ice Shelf =

Former ice shelf in the Arctic Ocean

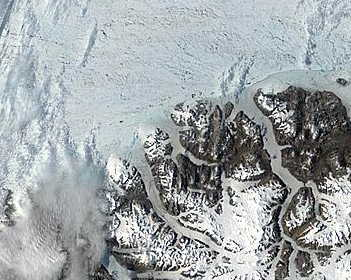
Before: Ellesmere Island on July 12, 2002.

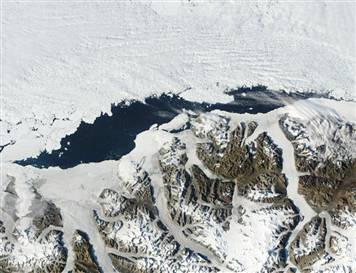
After: A NASA satellite image taken August 13, 2005, shows the collapse. The newly formed ice island forms only a small part of this picture, being the fragment very close to shore at the centre of the image.

The Ayles Ice Shelf (Note: The name, Ayles Ice Shelf, is no longer official according to the Geographical Names Board of Canada) was one of six major ice shelves in Canada, all on the north coast of Ellesmere Island, Nunavut. The ice shelf broke off from the coast on August 13, 2005, forming a giant ice island 37 metres (121 feet) thick and measuring around 14 by 5 kilometres (8.7 by 3.1 miles) in size (approximately 55 square kilometres (21 square miles) in area or 2.6 cubic kilometres (0.62 cubic miles) in volume). The oldest ice in the ice shelf is believed to be over 3,000 years old. The ice shelf was at (82°52′N 80°30′W), approximately 800 km (500 mi) south of the North Pole.

The Ayles Ice Shelf, like the nearby Mount Ayles, was named for the Arctic explorer, Adam Ayles, who served as the chief petty officer of HMS Alert under George Nares in the British Arctic Expedition. A 1986 survey of Canadian ice shelves found that 48 km^{2} (19 sq mi), a volume of 3.3 km^{3} (0.79 cu mi), of ice calved from the Milne and Ayles ice shelves between 1959 and 1974. Canada lost 94% of its overall ice shelf area between 1906 and 2015.

== Ayles Ice Island ==
On August 13, 2005, the entire shelf broke clear from the coast of Ellesmere, forming a new ice island. It is believed to be the largest shelf breakup of its kind in Canada in over 30 years. The event was registered on seismometers in northern Canada, and it was also verified via satellite imagery.

The breakup occurred over less than an hour. The event was noticed by the Canadian Ice Service at the time that it occurred, but it took a further 16 months to fully reconstruct the breakup sequence from past satellite images captured by Moderate Resolution Imaging Spectroradiometer (MODIS), to determine the climatic conditions during the event, and for the event to garner public attention. The event, which has been linked to climate change, is similar to the 2002 breakup of the Larsen B Ice Shelf in Antarctica.

Within days of the breakup, the former shelf had drifted over 50 km (31 mi) from Ellesmere Island before freezing into the sea ice for the winter. It was estimated in May 2007 to be between 42 and 45 m (138 and 148 ft) thick, on average.

The freed segment of the ice shelf, known as Ayles Ice Island, drifted southwesterly for two years, and in January 2007 accelerated into the open Arctic Ocean, causing concern for oil rig operators in the Beaufort Sea north of Prudhoe Bay, Alaska. In August 2007, however, the island became wedged into Sverdrup Inlet (75°27′N 86°12′W), northern Devon Island of the Queen Elizabeth Islands. Although scientists initially thought it was likely to remain there for some time, possibly permanently, it soon afterwards broke into two parts and resumed movement.

There is concern that the ice islands may become a hazard for ships and oil platforms.

== Other ice islands ==
While the formation of the Ayles Ice Island received widespread attention at the time due to the availability of satellite imagery and the ability of news media and scientists to visit the island, it was by no means unprecedented. On August 14, 1946, a United States Air Force patrol plane flying 480 km (300 mi) north of Point Barrow spotted an ice island, dubbed T-1, which was 24 by 29 km (15 by 18 mi). It was estimated to be from 62 to 488 m (204 to 1,600 ft) thick, with sides that rose from 9.1 to 61.0 m (30 to 200 ft) above the sea surface - much larger than the Ayles Ice Island.

Over the following three years, it travelled around 2,400 km (1,500 mi) along the Beaufort Eddy, a slow-moving ocean current that flows eastward across the North Pole, then back west along the coast. In 1950, the U.S. Air Force 58th Weather Reconnaissance Squadron was ordered to find T-1, and any other ice islands in the Arctic. In July 1950, T-2 was found, a roughly rectangular ice island estimated to be 32 by 32 km (20 by 20 mi) by dimension.

In 1947, a joint U.S.-Canadian expedition had noted and photographed a fresh water sea formation in the sea off Ellesmere Island. From a photographic examination of its ridges, T-2 was discovered to be the same ice island spotted off Ellesmere Island in 1947. Later in July 1950, the U.S. Air Force found Fletcher's Ice Island, or T-3, a kidney-shaped island, 14.5 by 7.2 km (9 by 4.5 mi). This was later occupied for brief periods in the early and mid-1950s. In August 1951, T-1 was relocated, nestled along the coast of Ellesmere Island. It is not known how long prior T-1, T-2, and T-3 had been formed, but it is believed they had calved from ice shelves on northern Ellesmere Island. There are an estimated 80 ice islands in Canada's High Arctic, most of them part of the pack ice that covers the region.

Between August 1961 and April 1962, almost 600 km^{2} (230 sq mi) of ice broke away from the Ward Hunt Ice Shelf. This event was attributed to tidal and seismic events.
