= HMS Alert (1856) =

19th-century British Royal Navy sloop

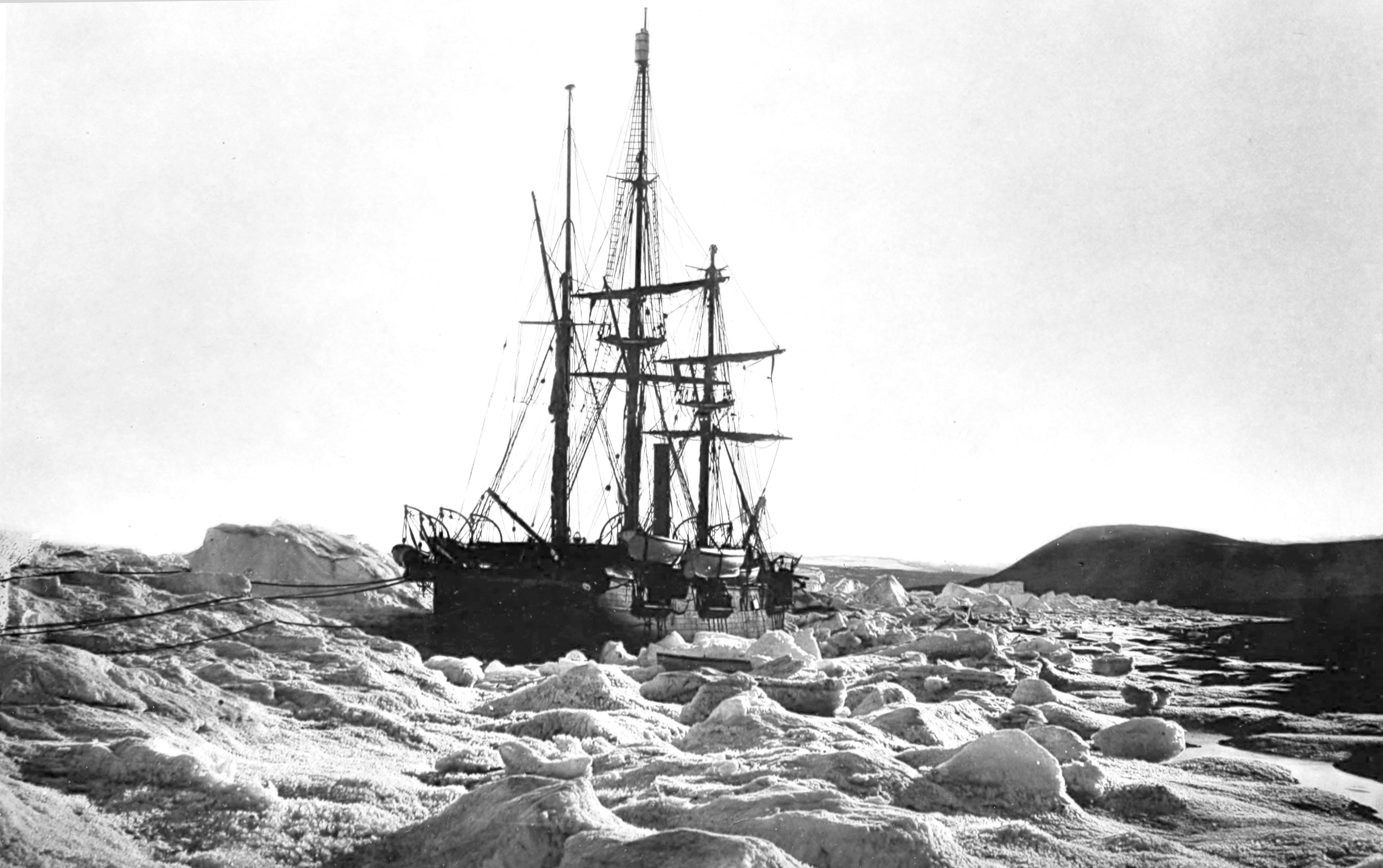
- Alert in pack ice during the Arctic Expedition of 1876

History

United Kingdom
- Name: Alert
- Ordered: 2 April 1853
- Builder: Royal Dockyard, Pembroke
- Cost: £36,743
- Laid down: January 1855
- Launched: 20 May 1856
- Acquired: 1855 by RN, 1884 by USN and 1885 by Canada
- Commissioned: 21 January 1858
- Decommissioned: 1894
- Out of service: 1894
- Fate: Loaned to US Navy on 20 February 1884–1885 and Canada 1885–1894; sold in 1894 and broken up

United States
- Name: Alert
- Acquired: 1884
- Fate: Loaned by the Admiralty to Canadian Government in May 1885

Canada
- Name: CGS Alert
- Operator: Marine Service of Canada of the Department of Marine and Fisheries
- Fate: Sold in November 1894

General characteristics
- Class & type: Cruizer-class sloop
- Displacement: 1,045 tons (1,240 tons after conversion for Arctic exploration)
- Tons burthen: 747 51/94 bm
- Length: 160 ft (49 m) (gundeck); 140 ft 1.75 in (42.7165 m) (keel)
- Beam: 31 ft 10 in (9.70 m)
- Depth of hold: 17 ft 6 in (5.33 m)
- Installed power: Indicated 383 hp (286 kW)
- Propulsion: Single screw; As built: Two-cylinder horizontal single-expansion steam engine; From 1874: R & W Hawthorn compound-expansion engine
- Sail plan: Barque-rigged
- Speed: 8.8 knots (16.3 km/h; 10.1 mph) under power
- Complement: As a Royal Navy sloop: 175; For Arctic exploration (1876): 62; In Canadian government service: 33 crew + 18 expedition staff
- Armament: As built: 1 × 32-pounder (56 cwt) pivot gun; 16 × 32-pounder (32 cwt) carriage guns; After 1874: 4 × Armstrong breech-loaders

HMS Alert was a 17-gun wooden screw sloop of the Cruizer class of the Royal Navy, launched in 1856 and broken up in 1894. She was the eleventh ship of the Royal Navy to bear the name (or a variant of it), and was noted for her Arctic exploration work; in 1876 she reached a record latitude of 82° North. Alert briefly served with the US Navy, and ended her career with the Canadian Marine Service as a lighthouse tender and buoy ship.

== Construction ==
The wooden sloops of the Cruizer class were designed under the direction of Lord John Hay, and after his "Committee of Reference" was disbanded, their construction was supervised by the new Surveyor of the Navy, Sir Baldwin Walker. Ordered together with her co-ship Falcon on 2 April 1853, Alert was laid down at the Royal Dockyard, Pembroke in January 1855. It was fitted at Chatham with a two-cylinder horizontal single-expansion steam engine, which was supplied by Ravenhill & Salkeld at a cost of £6,052 and generated an indicated horsepower of 383 hp (286 kW); driving a single screw, this gave a maximum speed of 8.8 knots (16.3 km/h). The class was given a barque-rig sail plan.

== Armament ==
All the ships of the class were provided with one 32-pounder (56 cwt) long heavy gun on a pivot mount and sixteen 32-pounder (32 cwt) carriage guns in a broadside arrangement. When she was converted for Arctic exploration in 1874, her armament was reduced to a token outfit of four Armstrong breech-loaders.

== History ==
=== Pacific Station (1857–1868) ===
Alert spent the first 11 years of her life on the Pacific Station, based at Esquimalt at the southern tip of Vancouver Island, Canada. Alert Bay, British Columbia is named after the ship, and nearby Pearse Island, at the north entrance to Johnstone Strait, is named after Commander William Alfred Rumbulow Pearse, her commanding officer. During this period it returned to Plymouth between October 1861 and May 1863 for a refit. Her service on the Pacific station was the type of work for which her class had been designed—the policing of Britain's far-flung maritime empire.

A photograph exists of Alert at Esquimalt, British Columbia from 1867, and it is further attested to by the following extract from The Colonist newspaper:

"The 'Alert' Taken! – On Wednesday, H.M.S. Alert was taken without resistance on the part of her officers and crew, who are believed to have lent themselves to the plot. The ship was lying at anchor in Esquimalt harbour when the affair occurred, and the time chosen by the enemy was noon-day. The captor was Mr. Robinson the Photographer, and the only weapons he used in effecting his object were a Camera, and a bit of glass."

— The Colonist, 5 July 1866

Alert paid off at Plymouth on 30 May 1868 and was placed in the Steam Reserve.

=== Arctic exploration (1874–1876) ===
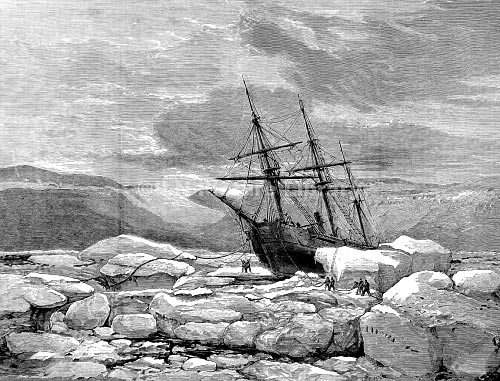
HMS Alert pushed aground by ice, Radmore Harbour, 1875–1876 (Illustrated London News, 1876)

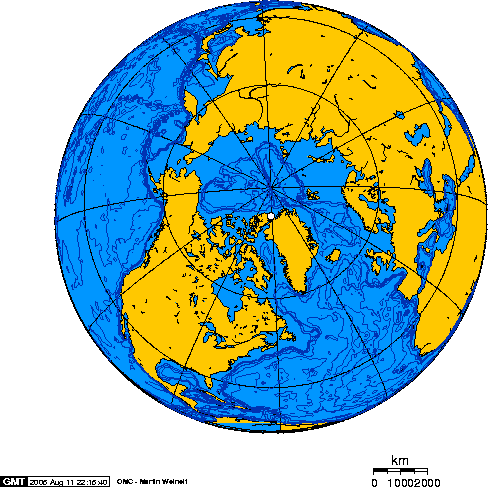
An orthographic projection showing the location of Alert, Nunavut

In 1874, Alert was taken in hand for conversion to the role of Arctic exploration. Her single-expansion engine was replaced with an R & W Hawthorn compound-expansion engine, it was re-boilered to 60 pounds per square inch (410 kPa), her armament was reduced to four guns and her hull was strengthened with felt-covered iron. Above the waterline it was sheathed with teak, and below it, Canadian elm and pitch-pine. The modifications caused her displacement to increase to 1,240 tons.

The British Arctic Expedition was commanded by Captain George Strong Nares, and comprised Alert (Captain Nares) and Discovery (Captain Henry Frederick Stephenson). The expedition aimed to reach the North Pole via Smith Sound, the sea passage between Greenland and Canada's northernmost island, Ellesmere Island. Contemporary geographers proposed that there could be an Open Polar Sea, and that if the thick layer of ice surrounding it were overcome, access to the North Pole by sea might be possible. Ever since Edward Augustus Inglefield had penetrated Smith Sound in 1852, it had been a likely route to the North.

Despite finding heavier-than-expected ice, the expedition pressed on. Leaving Discovery to winter at Lady Franklin Bay, Alert pressed on a further 50 nautical miles (93 km; 58 mi) through the Robeson Channel, establishing her winter quarters at Floeberg Beach. Spring 1876 saw considerable activity by sledge, charting the coasts of Ellesmere Island and Greenland, but scurvy had begun to take hold, with Alert suffering the greatest burden. On 3 April the second-in-command of Alert, Albert Hastings Markham, took a party north to attempt the Pole. By 11 May, having made slow progress, they reached their greatest latitude at 83° 20' 26"N. Suffering from snow blindness, scurvy and exhaustion, they turned back.

The expedition was rewarded on its return; Nares was knighted, Markham was promoted to captain. The geography of northern Canada and Greenland is dotted with the names of those connected with the expedition: Nares Strait, Nares Lake, Markham Ice Shelf, Ayles Ice Shelf, Doidge Bay and Mount Ayles. The northernmost permanently inhabited place on earth, the settlement of Alert at the northern point of Ellesmere Island, was named for the ship.

=== Survey (1876–1884) ===
Alert recommissioned at Chatham on 20 August 1878 under the command of Captain Sir George Strong Nares for a survey of the Strait of Magellan. On 12 March 1879 Captain John Maclear took command, and under him she went to Australia Station and the Pacific. She was employed in surveying, but the presence of Doctor Richard Coppinger, her surgeon, ensured that she also made a huge contribution to the field of zoology. Coppinger, who had also served in the Arctic expedition, was an accomplished naturalist and his collections from the period 1878–1882, which included indigenous cultural artifacts purloined, as he admitted, from Mutumui sites on Clack Island, added 1,300 species to the National Collection. Alert paid off at Sheerness on 20 September 1882.

=== Loan to the US Navy (1884) ===
Adolphus Greely led the Lady Franklin Bay Expedition to the Arctic in 1881. Two supply ships failed to reach his party, and a relief expedition in 1883 also failed to extract the team. The US Navy put together a further relief expedition in 1884 under Captain W. S. Schley, and Alert was offered. She was loaned to the US Navy under the command of Captain George W Coffin on 20 February 1884, and was used to set up supply dumps to support USS Bear in the extrication of Greely and his men.

Two members of Greely's expedition, Lieutenant James B. Lockwood and Sergeant David Legge Brainard had achieved a new record of 83° 30'N, just 4 miles (6.4 km) closer to the Pole than Markham had achieved in 1876. Lockwood and 19 other members of the expedition died; Greely, Brainard and four others survived.

=== Loan to the Canadian Government ===
In September 1880, the United Kingdom transferred its rights of Arctic sovereignty to Canada. From 1884 to 1886 the Canadian Marine Service of the Department of Marine and Fisheries sent an expedition to Hudson Bay to establish observation posts and to estimate the length of season for ice-free navigation. A former lieutenant of the Royal Navy, Andrew Robertson Gordon, was placed in command, and a suitable ship was sought. Having finished her work with the US Navy, Alert seemed the ideal vessel for the task. She was sailed to the Royal Naval Dockyard, Halifax and transferred by the senior naval officer to the marine agent of the Department of Marine and Fisheries.

"The Alert was a screw steamship, barque rigged, of about 700 tons gross . . . constructed as to be capable of resisting great ice pressure, and her engines being only 50 nominal horsepower, the screw is small . . . so that in every way she was well adapted for the work of the expedition."

— Andrew Robertson Gordon

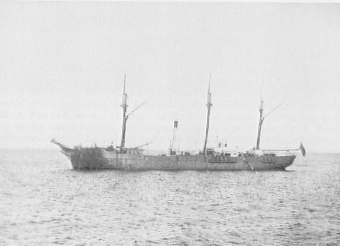
Alert as a lighthouse supply ship in 1893

In 1886 she carried Captain Markham, who had been second-in-command of Alert during the 1876 Arctic Exploration, and now represented the interests of a railway company interested in building a line from Winnipeg to Hudson Bay. Captain Markham left the ship at York Factory, Manitoba and returned by the Hayes River canoe route.

After the last Hudson Bay expedition in 1886, Alert was reconfigured as a light-house supply vessel and buoy tender. Her topmasts and yards were removed, and a wheelhouse was built abaft the remains of the main mast. She worked at first in Nova Scotia, but as her wooden hull showed signs of deterioration, she was moved to the Gulf of Saint Lawrence, sailing out of Quebec. Thirty years after her launch little was left of her original appearance; in essence she was now a small, old, low-powered steamer showing the scars of hard labour and many an ungainly conversion. Nevertheless, she continued to give useful service until the last decade of the nineteenth century.

== Disposal and remains ==
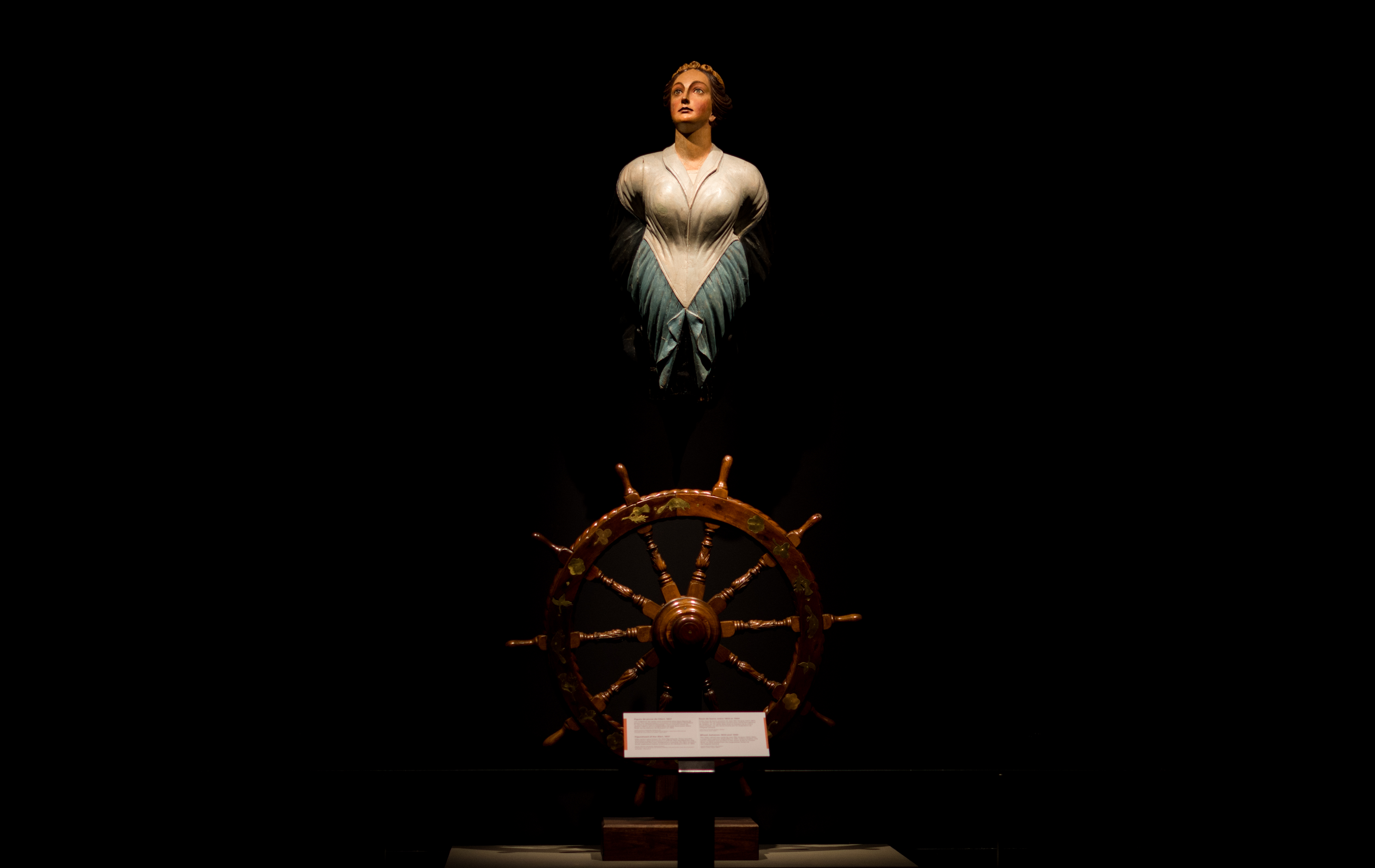
Alert's figurehead and wheel exhibited at Musée de la civilisation, Quebec City

CGS Alert was laid up in November 1894 and sold, the bill of exchange being forwarded to the Admiralty, since she was still officially on loan, the total sum being 814 pounds, 2 shillings and 7 pence. It was burned on the flats at Beauport but frame was sold for reuse.

The figurehead, wheel and other remains are part of the Musée de la civilisation's collections in Quebec City.

== Legacy ==
CFS Alert, a Canadian military listening post, Alert, Nunavut the world's northernmost continuously inhabited settlement, and Alert Bay, British Columbia, are named after the ship.

== See also ==
- European and American voyages of scientific exploration

== Sources ==
- Lyon, David & Winfield, Rif (2004). The Sail and Steam Navy List: All the Ships of the Royal Navy 1815–1889. Chatham Publishing. ISBN 978-1-86176-032-6. OCLC 52620555.
