= Milne Ice Shelf =

Ice shelf in the Arctic Ocean

- Location within Nunavut
- Type: Ice shelf
- Location: Ellesmere Island, Nunavut, Canada
- Coordinates: 82°45′N 081°55′W
- Area: 290 km^{2} (110 sq mi) (1986)
- Thickness: 100 metres (330 ft) (1986)

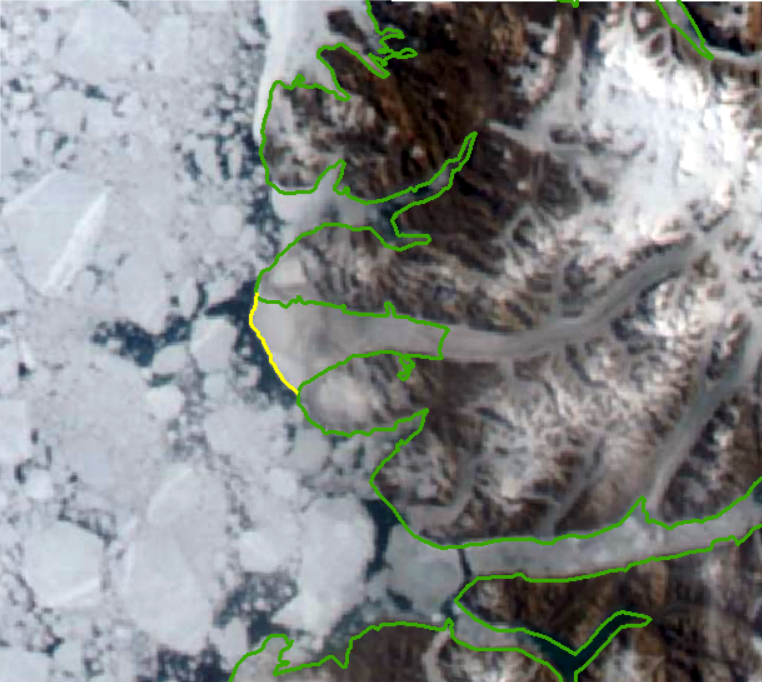
Milne ice shelf collapses on August 12, 2020

The Milne Ice Shelf, a fragment of the former Ellesmere Ice Shelf, is located in the Qikiqtaaluk Region, Nunavut, Canada. It is in Milne Ford, and between Cape Egerton and Cape Evans.

== Description of the ice shelf and its collapse ==
It is the second largest ice shelf in the Arctic Ocean. Situated on the north-west coast of Ellesmere Island, it is about 270 km (170 mi) west of Alert, Nunavut. In 1986, the ice shelf had an area of about 290 km^{2} (110 sq mi), with a central thickness of 100 m (330 ft).

It had been the last ice shelf in the Canadian Arctic to be fully intact until July 2020, when over 40 percent of the sheet collapsed within two days, a consequence of global warming. An uninhabited research camp was lost when the shelf collapsed. It included instruments for measuring water flow through the ice shelf.

The Northern Hemisphere's last epishelf lake was held back by the ice shelf. That ecosystem was an isolated body of fresh water floating on top of the sea, trapped behind the ice. It also disappeared in 2020.

== See also ==
- Abrupt climate change
- Arctic sea ice ecology and history
- Measurement of sea ice
- Sea ice thickness
