= British Arctic Expedition =

British research expedition to the Arctic undertaken between 1875 and 1876

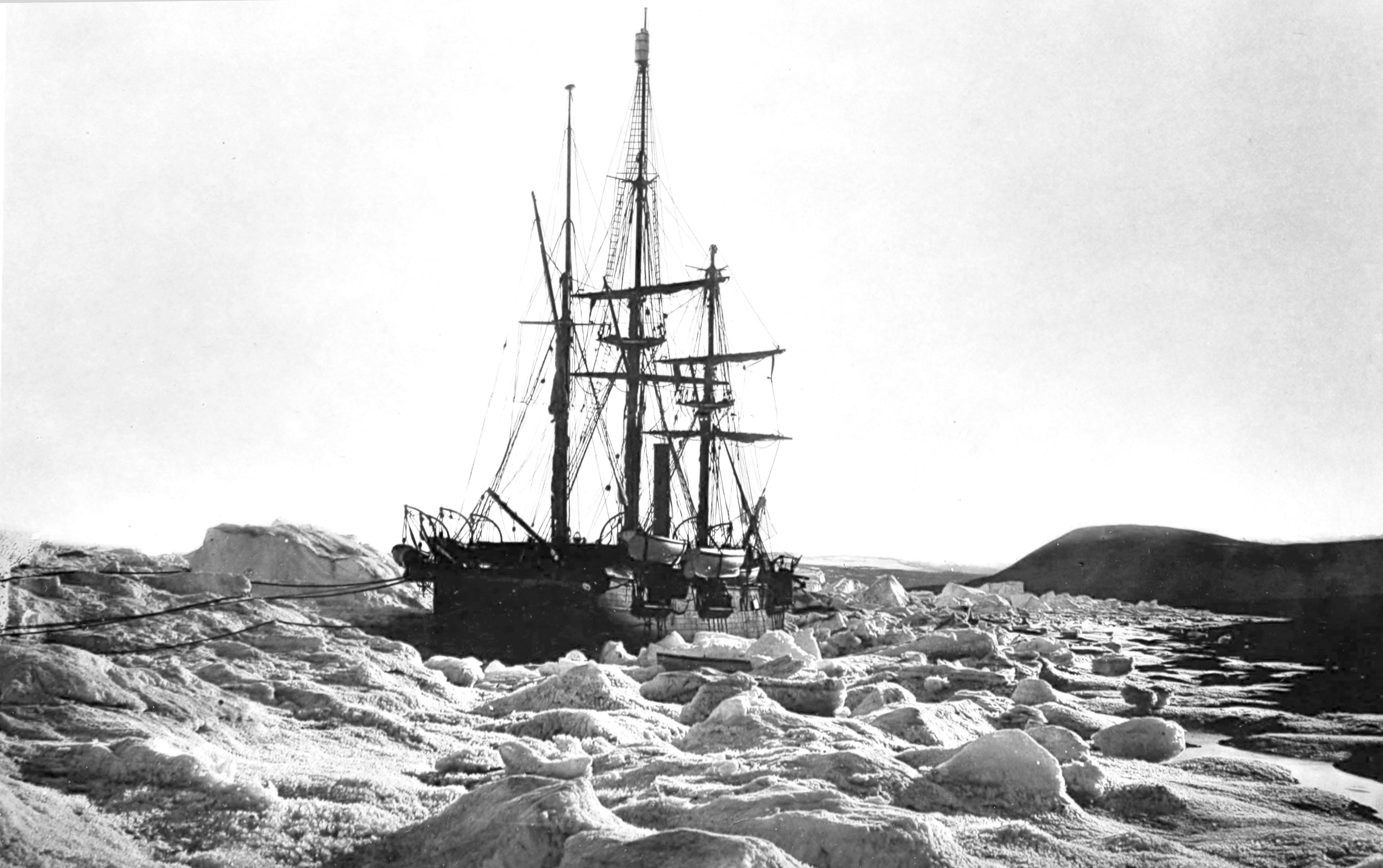
HMS Alert in pack ice

The British Arctic Expedition of 1875–1876, led by Sir George Nares, was sent by the British Admiralty to attempt to reach the North Pole via Smith Sound on the west coast of Greenland.

Although the expedition failed to reach the North Pole, the coasts of Greenland and Ellesmere Island were extensively explored and large amounts of scientific data were collected.

== History ==
Two ships, HMS Alert and HMS Discovery – captained by Henry Frederick Stephenson – sailed from Portsmouth on 29 May 1875.

On this expedition, Nares became the first explorer to take his ships all the way north through the channel between Greenland and Ellesmere Island – now named Nares Strait in his honour – to the Lincoln Sea. Up to this time, it had been a popular theory that this route would lead to the supposed Open Polar Sea, an ice-free region surrounding the pole, but Nares found only a wasteland of ice.

A sledging party under Commander Albert Hastings Markham set a new record, Farthest North of 83° 20′ 26″ N. Meanwhile, senior lieutenant Lewis Beaumont led a dog sled party from Discovery Harbour heading eastward in April 1876 to explore the northwestern shores of Greenland, reaching Sherard Osborn Fjord before turning back on 22 May.

Overall the expedition was a near-disaster. The men suffered badly from scurvy and were hampered by inappropriate clothing and equipment. Realising that his men could not survive another winter in the ice, Nares hastily retreated southward with both his ships in the summer of 1876. However, naval personnel and topographers, among them Thomas Mitchell, did succeed in documenting, by photograph, Inuit and the landscapes of what would become Canada's Northwest Territories and, later, Nunavut.

The expedition included future Admiral of the Fleet William May and Petty Officer Adam Ayles, after whom both the Ayles Ice Shelf and Mount Ayles are named. Other features named after the expedition include the Markham Ice Shelf, Nares Strait, Repulse Harbour and Alert, the most northerly permanently inhabited place on Earth. Pelham Aldrich was a lieutenant on the expedition and commanded the Western Sledge Party to Ellesmere Island, where Cape Aldrich was named in his honour.

== Aftermath ==
After the expedition returned to Britain, both Nares and the Admiralty faced criticism for the expedition's return after less than one year in the Arctic and for the outbreak of scurvy. Much of the criticism focused on the fact that the expedition's officers had continued to issue a rum ration on sledging journeys. An Admiralty report concluded that this decision had been unwise and had contributed to the scurvy outbreak.

== Sledge flags ==
Albert Hastings Markham

Alfred Arthur Chase Parr

Reginald Baldwin Fulford

== See also ==
- Cartographic expeditions to Greenland
- List of Arctic expeditions

Media related to British Arctic Expedition 1875 at Wikimedia Commons

== Bibliography ==
- George Nares: Narrative of a voyage to the Polar Sea during 1875–76 in H.M. ships 'Alert' and 'Discovery, two volumes, London 1878; online book Volume 1 & Volume 2
- John Edwards Caswell. The RGS and the British Arctic Expedition, 1875–76. The Geographical Journal 143(2) (Jul., 1977), pp. 200–210.
