= Markham Ice Shelf =

Ice shelf in the Arctic Ocean

Coordinates: 83.0453°N 71.4736°W

The Markham Ice Shelf was one of five major ice shelves in Canada, all on the north coast of Ellesmere Island, Nunavut. The ice shelf broke off from the coast in early August 2008, becoming adrift in the Arctic Ocean. The 4,500-year-old ice shelf was then 19 square miles (49 km^{2}) in size, nearly the size of Manhattan, and approximately ten stories tall. On September 3, 2008, CNN quoted Derek Mueller, of Trent University in Ontario, Canada as saying to the Associated Press:

The Markham Ice Shelf was a big surprise because it suddenly disappeared. We went under cloud for a bit during our research and when the weather cleared up, all of a sudden there was no more ice shelf. It was a shocking event that underscores the rapidity of changes taking place in the Arctic... The Markham Ice Shelf had half the biomass for the entire Canadian Arctic Ice Shelf ecosystem as a habitat for cold tolerant microbial life; algae that sit on top of the ice shelf and photosynthesize like plants would. Now that it's disappeared, we're looking at ecosystems on the verge of extinction.

According to images from NASA, the ice shelf completely disintegrated over a period of 6 days in August 2008. By 2015, it had completely melted.

The ice shelf was named for Albert Hastings Markham, a British Arctic explorer.
