= Pelham Aldrich =

Royal Navy Admiral

Admiral Pelham Aldrich CVO
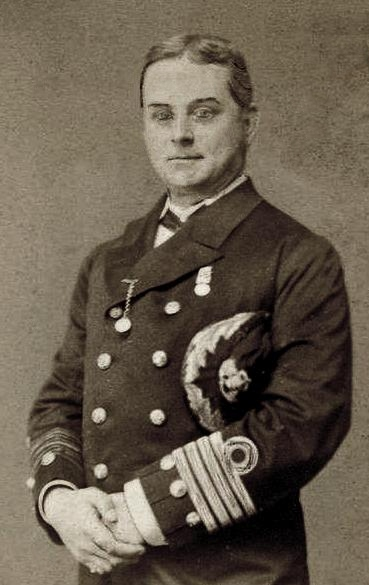
- Aldrich in 1884
- Born: 8 December 1844; Mildenhall, Suffolk
- Died: 12 November 1930 (aged 85); Great Bealings, Suffolk
- Burial place: Great Bealings, Suffolk
- Military career
- Allegiance: United Kingdom
- Branch: Royal Navy
- Service years: 1859–1908
- Rank: Admiral
- Commands: HMS Sylvia; HMS Fawn; HMS Egeria

Admiral Pelham Aldrich CVO (8 December 1844 – 12 November 1930) was a Royal Navy officer and explorer, who became Admiral Superintendent of Portsmouth Docks.

== Biography ==
He was born in Mildenhall, Suffolk, the son of Dr. Pelham Aldrich and Elizabeth Frances Aldrich, and married Edith Caroline Issacson in 1875. He entered the Royal Navy as a Naval Cadet in June 1859 and was promoted to sub-lieutenant on 17 September 1864 and lieutenant on 11 September 1866. He served as a lieutenant on the corvette Scout, then from 18 December 1869 on the broadside ironclad Lord Warden and from 15 November 1872 on the Challenger as first lieutenant.

Whilst on board the Challenger, he took part in the four-year-long Challenger expedition of 1872–76 – a scientific expedition that made many discoveries to lay the foundation of oceanography. In 1875, he transferred to the sloop Alert to take part in the British Arctic Expedition, which was sent by the British Admiralty to attempt to reach the North Pole via Smith Sound. Aldrich commanded the Western Sledge Party to Ellesmere Island, and what is often described as the most northerly point of North America is named Cape Aldrich in his honour. He became a commander on 3 November 1876 and commanded the Sylvia and Fawn on surveying expeditions of China and the Mediterranean. As captain of Fawn he, along with the scientist Stephen Joseph Perry, observed the 1882 transit of Venus from an improvised tent observatory in Madagascar. He was promoted to captain on 29 June 1883, commanding the Sylvia and Egeria on further surveying expeditions of the Cape of Good Hope and Australia.

In 1888 Egeria visited Christmas Island. On board was Charles Wyville Thomson (who had been chief scientist on the Challenger Expedition) who named a crinoid Bathycrinus aldrichianus after Aldrich. In 1978 a Christmas Island stamp was issued in his honour.

Mount Aldrich, in Antarctica, was named after him by Robert Scott to thank him for his assistance given in preparing for Scott's expedition.

Aldrich was promoted to rear-admiral on 21 December 1898, and served as admiral superintendent of Portsmouth Dockyard between 1 September 1899 and 1 September 1902, flagship HMS Asia. He was appointed a Commander of the Royal Victorian Order (CVO) by King Edward VII in 1902. The following year, he was promoted to vice-admiral on 12 August 1903 and finally admiral on 1 March 1907.

He retired from the Navy on 22 March 1908 and moved to The Croft, in Great Bealings in Suffolk. He died in Great Bealings and was buried in the local churchyard on 17 November 1930. His wife was buried in the same place on 6 May 1943, aged 94.

Military offices
Preceded by Vice-Admiral Ernest Rice	Admiral-Superintendent of Portsmouth Dockyard; 1899–1902	Succeeded by Rear-Admiral Reginald Friend Hannam Henderson
