= Dr. Neil Trivett Global Atmosphere Watch Observatory =

Observatory in Nunavut

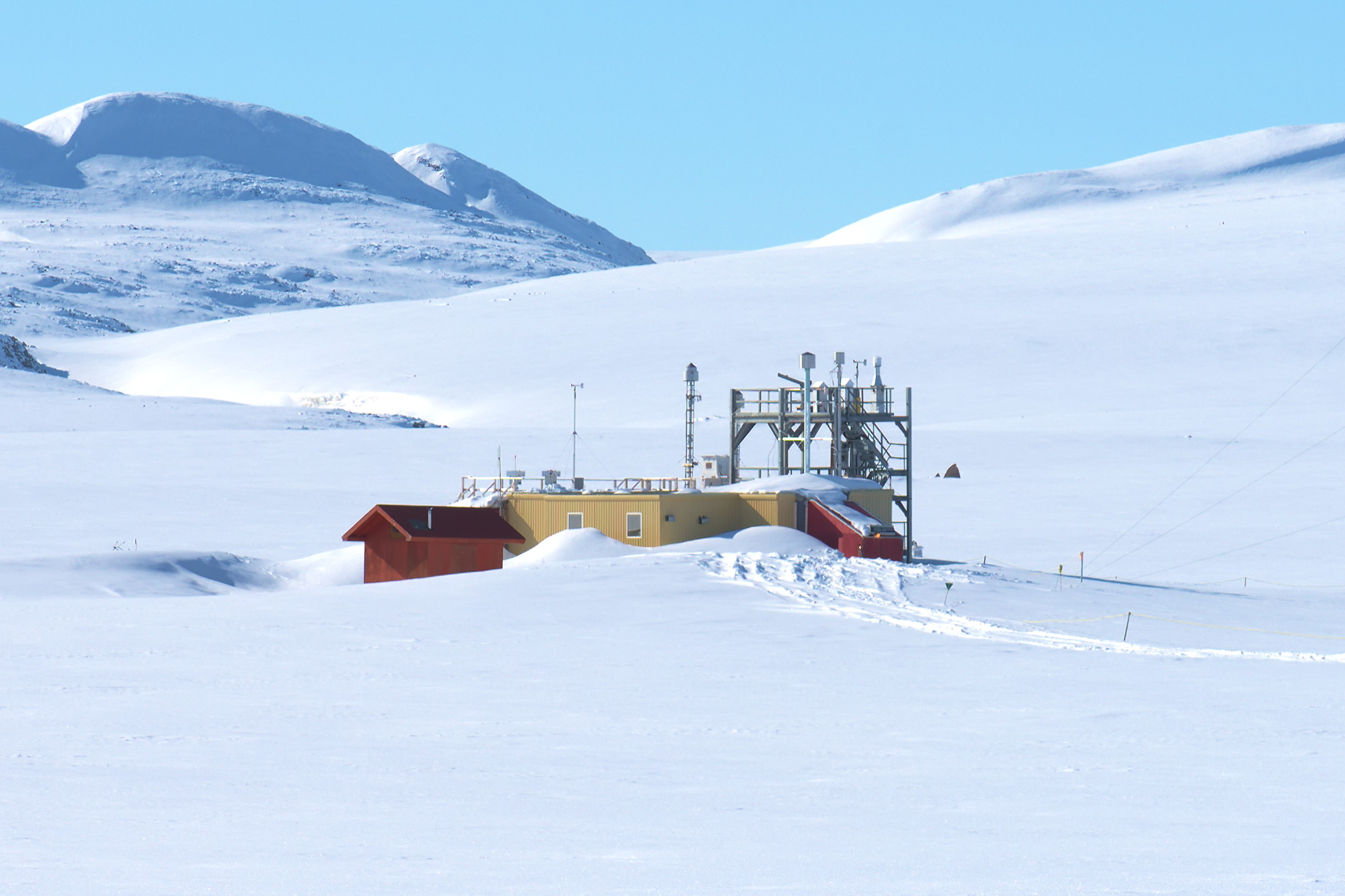
- The observatory in June 2016
- Alternative names: NOAA arctic atmospheric observatory at Alert
- Organization: Environment and Climate Change Canada
- Location: Alert, Nunavut, Canada
- Coordinates: 82°27′03″N 62°30′26″W
- Altitude: 185 m (607 ft)
- Established: August 29, 1986
- Website: www.canada.ca/en/environment-climate-change.html
- Location within Nunavut
- Related media on Commons

The Dr. Neil Trivett Global Atmosphere Watch Observatory is an atmospheric baseline station operated by Environment and Climate Change Canada located about 6 km (3.7 mi) south south-west of Alert, Nunavut, Canada, on the north-eastern tip of Ellesmere Island, about 800 km (500 mi) south of the geographic North Pole.

The observatory is the northernmost of 31 global stations in an international network coordinated by the World Meteorological Organization (WMO) under its Global Atmosphere Watch (GAW) program to study the long-term effects of pollution on the atmospheric environment. Among these 31 stations, Alert is one of three greenhouse gas "intercomparison supersites", along with Mauna Loa in Hawaii and Cape Grim in Australia, which, due to their locations far from industrial activity, provide the international scientific community with a baseline record of atmospheric chemistry.

== Geography ==
The observatory is located on a plateau about 6 km (3.7 mi) south of Canadian Forces Station (CFS) Alert, which is itself located on the shore of the Lincoln Sea, 15 km (9.3 mi) from the mouth of the Nares Strait. The region is characterized by recent glacial activity, with still extant glaciers visible among the peaks of the United States Range approximately 40 km (25 mi) to the west. The landscape immediately surrounding the observatory is undulating, marked by cliffs and crevasses and a number of small rivers which can become impassable during freshet.

To the south, the Winchester Hills are the dominant visible feature. A number of small freshwater lakes provide CFS Alert (and by extension, the observatory) with drinking water.

Due to its high latitude, the observatory experiences 24-hour daylight from the beginning of April to early September, and the sun remains below the horizon from mid-October to late February and both civil polar night and nautical polar night will occur. The intermediate periods are marked by a slight diurnal cycle. The dark season is responsible for much of the unique atmospheric chemistry that occurs during polar sunrise. The lack of sunlight to act as a catalyst causes a buildup of pollution from industrial areas down south, and the polar vortex amplifies this effect by containing pollution within the high Arctic. During sunrise, this pollution is responsible for a phenomenon known as Arctic haze.

== Climate ==
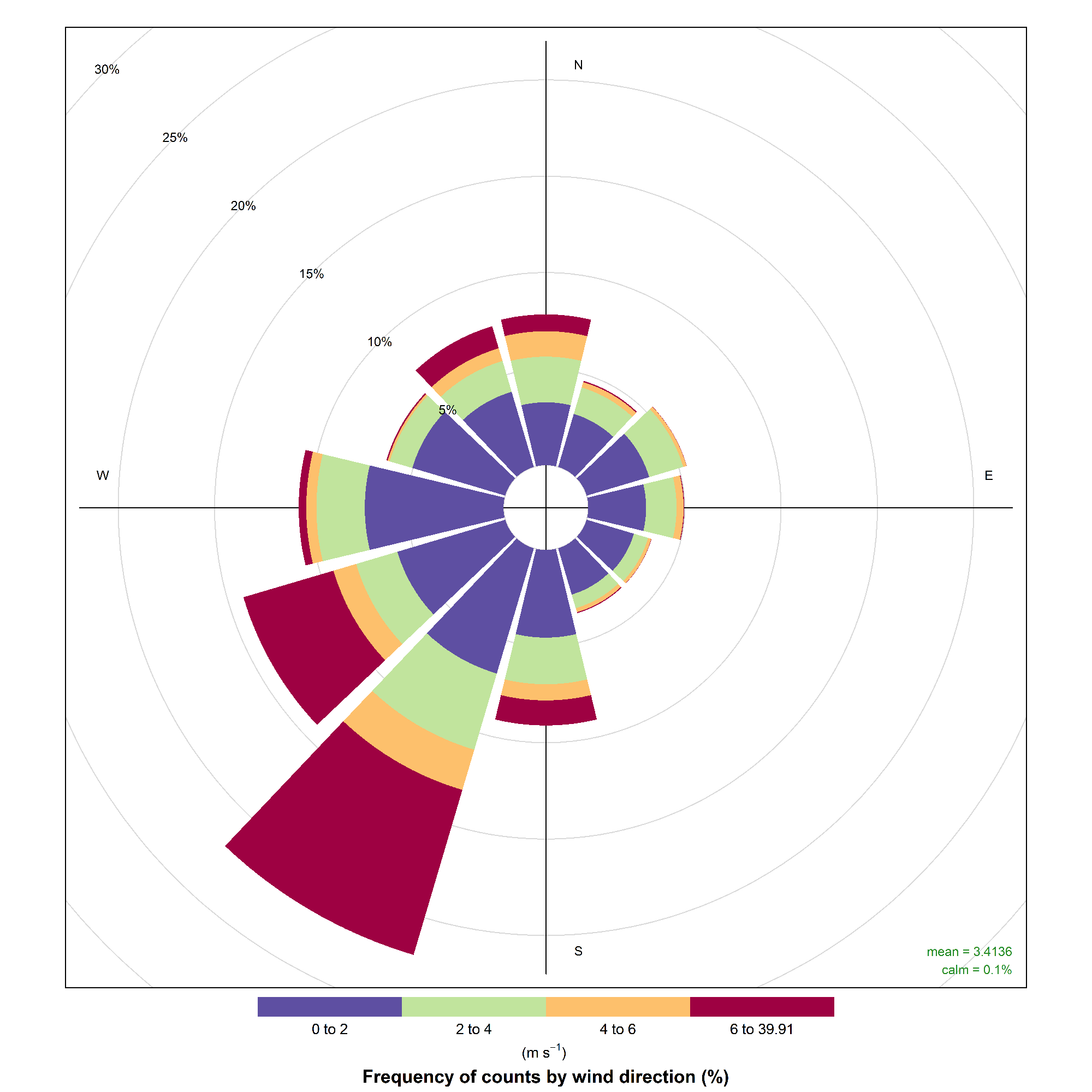
Windrose produced with data from the observatory's anemometers, 1987-2015

Alert's climate is very dry, seeing very little annual precipitation. (It is, in fact, considered a desert.) What rain does fall generally comes in the form of mist or drizzle during the four months, June to September. Heavy snowfalls are typically confined to the period from September through November, but can occur again after polar sunrise. Fog is common due to proximity to the ocean, particularly in the summer and fall. When temperatures drop below freezing in September and October, the damp air also causes accumulations of hoar frost.

Conditions in Alert are cold, with only two months of the year seeing average temperatures above the freezing point. Like most places in the Arctic, snow is possible in any month of the year. However, Alert is not as cold as other locations further south, such as Eureka, because proximity to the Arctic Ocean has as a moderating effect. It is more accurate to characterize conditions in Alert as consistently cold, rather than extremely cold.

Prevailing winds at the observatory are from the southwest, which usually bring clear skies and warmer temperatures. North winds off the ocean are typically accompanied by fog and sudden drops in temperature. However, north winds are also unwelcome at the observatory, since they bring exhaust from the station's diesel generators. (The presence of such exhaust makes accurate readings of background atmospheric pollutants impossible during these time periods, since the exhaust signature has a time-varying component that is influenced both by source conditions and by turbulence. Thus it cannot be corrected for simply by subtracting it from the instrument readings.)

Weather conditions are typically calm through the dark winter months, once the polar vortex has set up for the season. Three out of five days have wind speeds below 2 m/s (6.6 ft/s) at this time of year. (However, when windy conditions arise in the winter, they tend to be extreme. Storms can last for days at a time.) These conditions continue through polar sunrise, but reverse dramatically with the onset of spring weather, which brings high, gusting winds.

== History ==
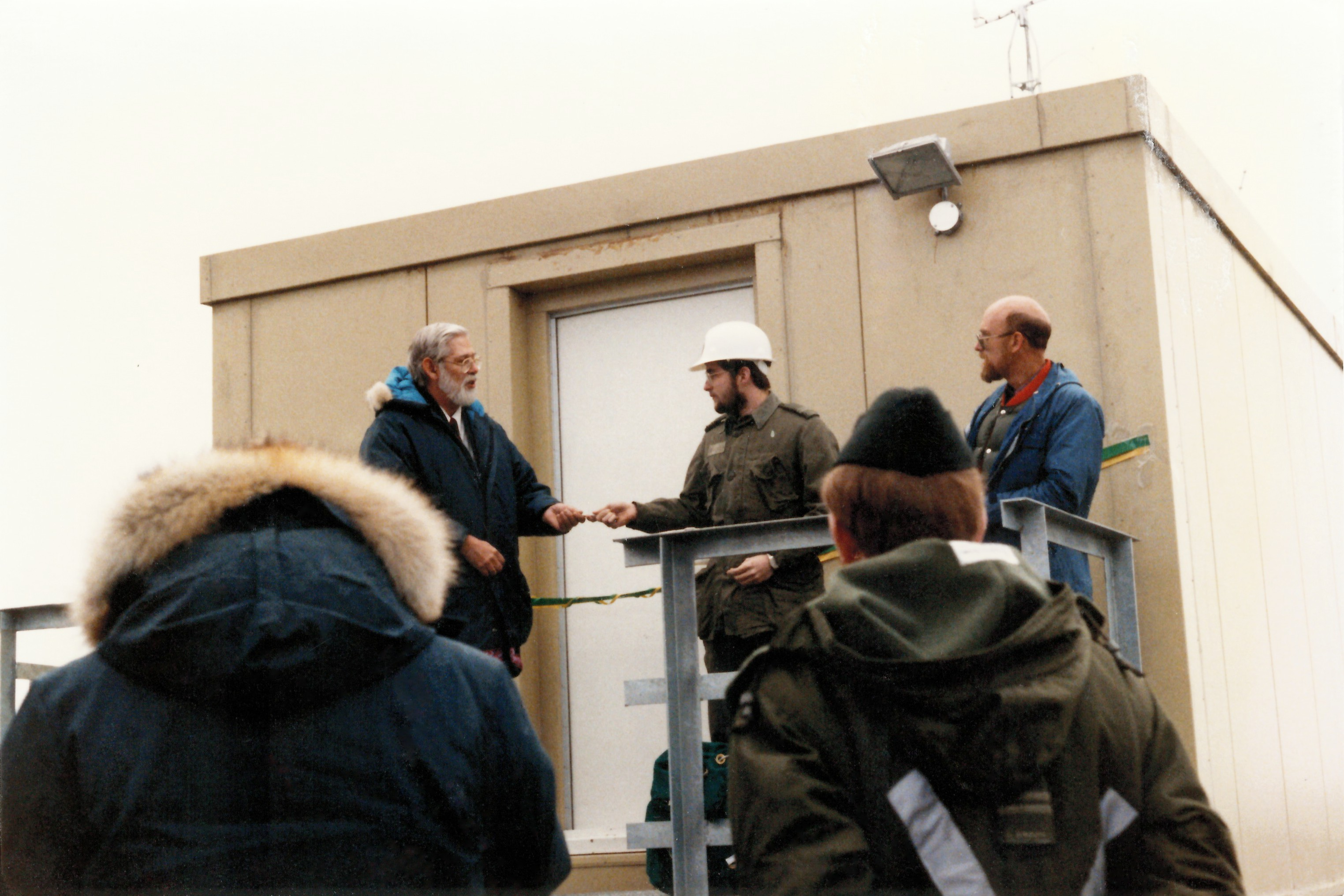
Official opening of the BAPMoN Observatory, August 29, 1986. Assistant Deputy Minister Howard Ferguson, left, stands at the entrance to the observatory with the Project Commander from 1 CEU, Winnipeg and Dr. Neil Trivett.

The establishment of the Joint Arctic Weather Station (JAWS) on April 9, 1950 marked the beginning of continuous meteorological measurements in Alert. The weather station frequently provided support for scientific research in Alert, including the collection of weekly flask samples for the measurement of carbon dioxide, the first of which was taken on July 8, 1975.

Increasing interest in studies of phenomena such as Arctic haze led to a conference in 1977 in Lillestrøm, Norway with participation from scientists of seven different countries. Following this conference, the Arctic Air-Sampling Network (AASN) was created to share data between scientific organizations in each member nation. To fulfill Canadian obligations to this program, the Canadian Arctic Aerosol Sampling Network (CAASN) was created, eventually consisting of three stations: Mould Bay (April 1979), Igloolik (November 1979), and Alert (July 1980). In 1984, the program was condensed and refocused. The sampling programs in Igloolik and Mould Bay were discontinued, and the program in Alert became part of the core mandate of the newly reformed Canadian Arctic Aerosol Chemistry Program (CAACP).

The gradually increasing amount of experimental research being done in Alert made the construction of a permanent observatory a viable option. In 1985, the Canadian Baseline Program was founded, and on August 29 the following year the Alert Background Air Pollution Monitoring Network (BAPMoN) Observatory was officially opened. In 1989, the WMO's BAPMoN program was merged with the Global Ozone Observing System (GO_{3}OS) to form the Global Atmosphere Watch Program.

In 1992, the original observatory building was expanded to roughly three times its size, including the addition of a 10 m (33 ft) tall walk-up tower.

Following the death of Dr. Neil Trivett in 2002 (an Environment Canada researcher who was largely responsible for the construction of the observatory), it was officially renamed in July 2006 as the Dr. Neil Trivett Global Atmosphere Watch Observatory.

== Measurements and research ==
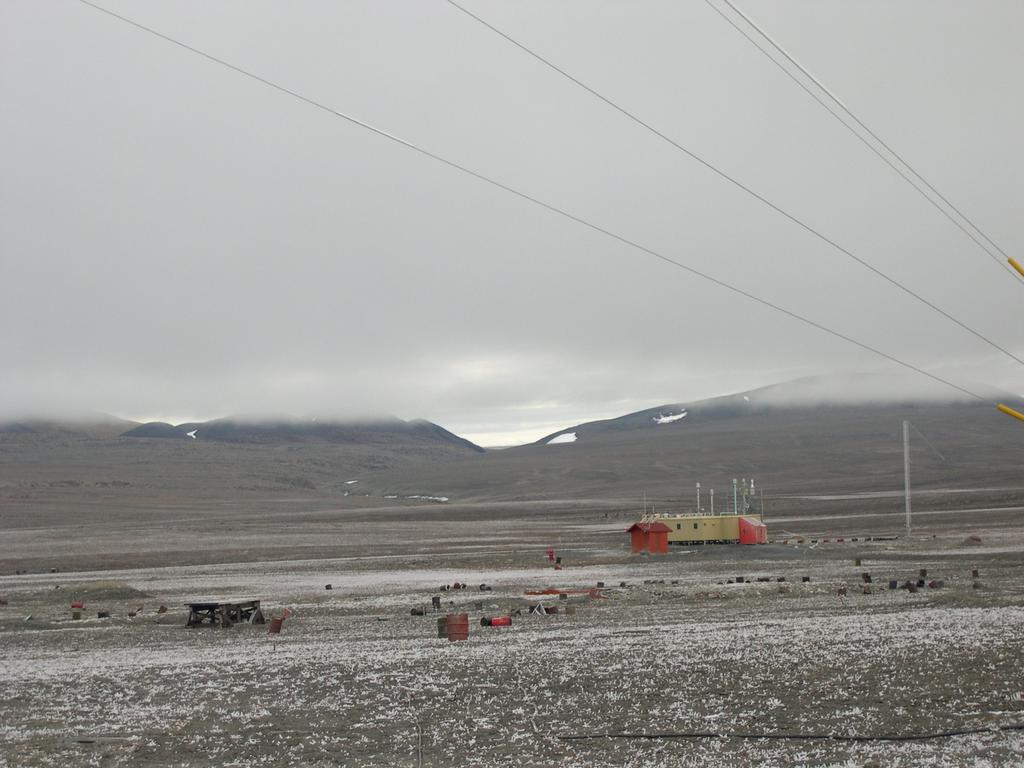
The observatory in August 2003

In addition to the ongoing flask sample programs, the observatory maintains a core group of continuous measurement programs which include monitoring of aerosols, mercury, greenhouse gases, ozone (both ground level and stratospheric), broadband solar irradiance and albedo, permafrost temperatures, persistent organic pollutants (POPs), and ground level meteorological conditions.

The observatory also supports experimental testing of new monitoring equipment, and short-term, intensive research programs, e.g., NETCARE (Network on Climate and Aerosols: Addressing Key Uncertainties in Remote Canadian Environments).

Much of the research and data collection at the observatory is collaborative, including long-standing partnerships with, e.g., National Oceanic and Atmospheric Administration (NOAA), Heidelberg University, the Scripps Institution of Oceanography, CSIRO, Natural Resources Canada, and Health Canada.

=== Depletion events ===
While it had been known since 1988 that ground level ozone underwent periodic rapid depletions during March–June each year, it was not discovered until 1995 that atmospheric mercury behaved in a nearly identical manner. (The first continuous monitoring instruments for atmospheric mercury were installed at the observatory that year.) Until that time, it was generally agreed that elemental mercury persisted in the atmosphere for 6–12 months, which allowed it to reach remote locations such as the Arctic, far from emission sources.

In the springtime, elemental mercury undergoes photochemically initiated oxidation reactions and converts to a more reactive and less stable form of mercury in the atmosphere. This was a means by which mercury could be removed from the atmosphere and deposit to the ground that was not previously known. These events were later termed atmospheric mercury depletion events (AMDEs), and the underlying chemistry that connects them with the simultaneous ozone depletions has been and continues to be thoroughly researched.

== See also ==
- List of research stations in the Arctic
