= Cape Sheridan =

Peninsula in Nunavut, Canada

- Cape
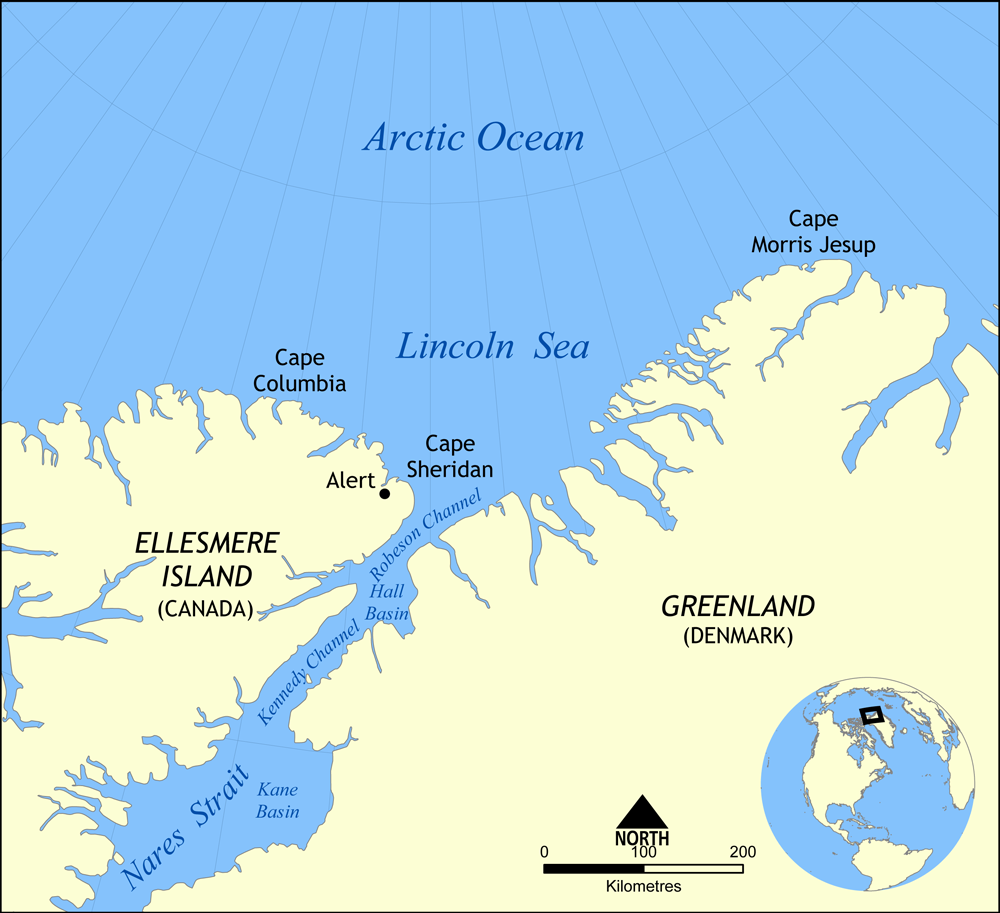
- Map of Cape Sheridan and the Lincoln Sea

- Coordinates: 82°28′N 061°30′W
- Location: Ellesmere Island, Nunavut, Canada
- Offshore water bodies: Lincoln Sea
- Topo map: NTS 120E6 Cape Rawson

Cape Sheridan is on the northeastern coast of Ellesmere Island, Canada situated on the Lincoln Sea in the Arctic Ocean, on the mouth of Sheridan River, west bank. It is one of the closest points of land to the geographic North Pole, approximately 840 km (520 mi) to the north, Cape Columbia is however some 75 km (47 mi) closer to the Pole.

Cape Sheridan was the wintering site of Robert Peary's final quest to reach the north pole in 1908 / 1909; the Cape Sheridan Depot being located there.

Alert, the northernmost permanently inhabited place in the world, is located 13 km (8.1 mi) to the west.

== Climate ==
Climate data is obtained from Alert Airport, approximately 12.5 km (7.8 mi) to the northwest.

The area has a polar climate, technically a tundra climate (ET) with characteristics of an ice cap climate (EF). There is complete snow cover for at least 10 months of the year on average and snow from one year persists into the next year in protected areas, but enough melts to prevent glaciation. The warmest month, July, has an average temperature of 3.4 °C (38.1 °F), with only July and August averaging above freezing, and those are also the months where well over 90 per cent of the rainfall, which averages only 17.4 mm (0.69 in) per year, occurs. Rain is rare in June and September and virtually unheard of during the remaining eight months of the year. Alert is the fourth-driest locality in Nunavut and averaging only 158.3 mm (6.23 in) of precipitation per year, the vast majority of this occurring as snow. The heaviest snowfalls occur during July to October, and Alert sees relatively little snowfall during the winter months. September is usually the month with the heaviest snowfall.

February is the coldest month of the year with a mean temperature of −33.2 °C (−27.8 °F). The yearly mean, −17.7 °C (0.1 °F), is the second-coldest in Nunavut after Eureka. Snowfall can occur during any month of the year, and the typical year sees no more than five days in a row without frost. Average highs rise above freezing only in mid-June and drop below freezing at the end of August.

Being far north of the Arctic Circle, the area experiences polar night from approximately 14 October to 27 February, and midnight sun from 7 April to 4 September. There are two relatively short periods of twilight from about 13 February to 24 March and the second from 18 September to 29 October. The civil polar night lasts from 29 October to 13 February.

Climate data for Alert (Alert Airport) Climate ID: 2400300; coordinates 82°31′04″N 62°16′50″W; elevation: 30.5 m (100 ft); 1991–2020 normals, extremes 1950–present (Note: Climate data 1991–2020 is a composite recorded at Alert Upper Air, Alert Climate (WMO ID: 71082 / 71355; Climate ID: 2400306 / 2400305; coordinates 82°30′N 62°20′W; elevation: 65.4 m (215 ft)), and Alert (Climate ID: 2400300; coordinates 82°31′04″N 62°16′50″W; elevation: 30.5 m (100 ft)))
Month	Jan	Feb	Mar	Apr	May	Jun	Jul	Aug	Sep	Oct	Nov	Dec	Year
Record high humidex	0.0	0.0	−2.4	−1.1	8.1	18.6	20.2	23.8	8.4	4.6	−1.1	1.4	23.8
Record high °C (°F)	1.8 (35.2)	1.1 (34.0)	−2.2 (28.0)	2.4 (36.3)	10.0 (50.0)	18.8 (65.8)	21.0 (69.8)	19.5 (67.1)	11.2 (52.2)	5.3 (41.5)	0.6 (33.1)	3.2 (37.8)	21.0 (69.8)
Mean daily maximum °C (°F)	−27.0 (−16.6)	−27.6 (−17.7)	−27.1 (−16.8)	−19.4 (−2.9)	−8.2 (17.2)	2.4 (36.3)	6.8 (44.2)	3.8 (38.8)	−5.1 (22.8)	−13.6 (7.5)	−20.4 (−4.7)	−24.3 (−11.7)	−13.3 (8.1)
Daily mean °C (°F)	−30.7 (−23.3)	−31.4 (−24.5)	−31.0 (−23.8)	−23.3 (−9.9)	−11.1 (12.0)	0.1 (32.2)	3.9 (39.0)	1.2 (34.2)	−8.0 (17.6)	−17.2 (1.0)	−24.1 (−11.4)	−28.1 (−18.6)	−16.7 (1.9)
Mean daily minimum °C (°F)	−34.4 (−29.9)	−35.2 (−31.4)	−34.9 (−30.8)	−27.0 (−16.6)	−14.0 (6.8)	−2.3 (27.9)	1.0 (33.8)	−1.4 (29.5)	−10.9 (12.4)	−20.7 (−5.3)	−27.8 (−18.0)	−31.9 (−25.4)	−20.0 (−4.0)
Record low °C (°F)	−48.9 (−56.0)	−50.0 (−58.0)	−49.4 (−56.9)	−45.6 (−50.1)	−29.0 (−20.2)	−14.3 (6.3)	−6.3 (20.7)	−15.0 (5.0)	−28.2 (−18.8)	−39.4 (−38.9)	−43.5 (−46.3)	−46.1 (−51.0)	−50.0 (−58.0)
Record low wind chill	−64.7	−60.5	−59.5	−56.8	−40.8	−21.1	−10.3	−19.2	−36.9	−49.4	−53.7	−57.3	−64.7
Average precipitation mm (inches)	10.5 (0.41)	7.3 (0.29)	10.3 (0.41)	11.5 (0.45)	11.6 (0.46)	11.1 (0.44)	21.5 (0.85)	18.4 (0.72)	17.8 (0.70)	12.1 (0.48)	11.5 (0.45)	8.5 (0.33)	152.0 (5.98)
Average rainfall mm (inches)	0.0 (0.0)	0.0 (0.0)	0.0 (0.0)	0.0 (0.0)	0.0 (0.0)	2.3 (0.09)	10.8 (0.43)	5.3 (0.21)	0.2 (0.01)	0.0 (0.0)	0.0 (0.0)	0.0 (0.0)	18.5 (0.73)
Average snowfall cm (inches)	12.7 (5.0)	9.6 (3.8)	12.2 (4.8)	13.2 (5.2)	17.1 (6.7)	11.1 (4.4)	12.8 (5.0)	15.9 (6.3)	30.5 (12.0)	25.5 (10.0)	18.3 (7.2)	13.0 (5.1)	191.7 (75.5)
Average precipitation days (≥ 0.2 mm)	12.4	8.8	11.5	10.1	9.0	7.6	9.6	10.0	11.2	12.3	10.6	10.9	124.1
Average rainy days (≥ 0.2 mm)	0.0	0.0	0.0	0.0	0.1	1.7	5.7	3.4	0.5	0.0	0.0	0.0	11.3
Average snowy days (≥ 0.2 cm)	11.6	9.7	10.2	8.7	9.4	5.4	4.1	6.8	11.5	13.0	10.7	11.1	112.2
Average relative humidity (%) (at 1500 LST)	70.8	70.4	70.1	72.4	81.3	84.5	81.7	84.4	85.3	79.3	73.6	71.8	77.1
Mean monthly sunshine hours	0.0	0.0	110.4	323.6	428.6	333.0	321.6	269.1	111.4	3.9	0.0	0.0	1,901.6
Percentage possible sunshine	—	—	33.1	46.8	57.6	46.3	43.2	36.2	21.9	4.1	—	—	36.1
Source: Environment and Climate Change Canada (sun 1981–2010) (April maximum)
