= Operation Hurricane (Canada) =

Annual Canadian arctic technical maintenance mission

Operation Hurricane is an annual month-long technical maintenance mission conducted by Canadian Forces personnel in the Canadian Arctic.

Each summer, since 1982, Canadian military technicians and support personnel have been deployed by helicopters to repair and resupply the otherwise unattended High Arctic Data Communications System (HADCS), between CFS Alert and Eureka, located on Ellesmere Island in Nunavut.

In 2005, military personnel also conducted a patrol, during which they raised a Canadian flag on Hans Island – a small, barren island in the Nares Strait, between northern Ellesmere Island and Greenland. Denmark disputed Canada's claim to this territory until 2022 when the countries agreed to split the island between both nations, ending a 17 year negotiation process.

== See also ==
- List of Canadian military operations
- North Warning System
- Canadian Rangers
