= Fosheim Peninsula =

Peninsula in Nunavut, Canada

Coordinates: 79°40′N 083°45′W

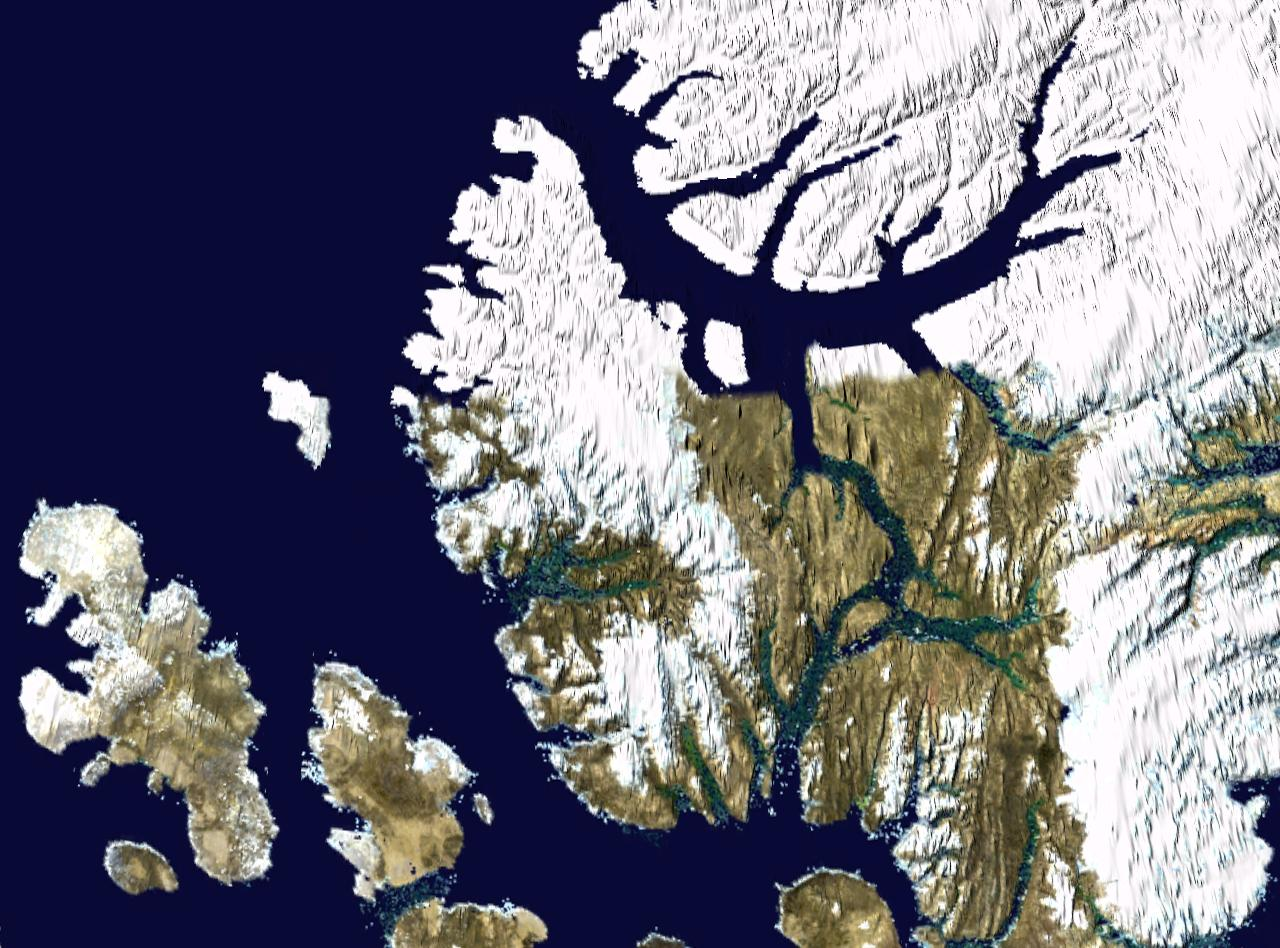

The Fosheim Peninsula is located in western Ellesmere Island, a part of the Qikiqtaaluk Region of the Canadian territory of Nunavut. Eureka, a permanent research community, is located on the north side of Slidre Fiord, a few kilometers east of Eureka Sound. While the peninsula was first sighted by the Arctic explorer Adolphus Greely in 1881, it was not explored until 1899 by Otto Sverdrup, who named it after Ivar Fosheim, a member of his expedition.

On December 24, 2013, CBC News reported that ancient Camel fossils had been found in a petrified forest of paleontological significance, on the peninsula. Canada Coal had been considering proposing exploitation of coal reserves in the region, and said it would take the fossil riches into account in a revised proposal.
