= Alert, Nunavut =

Weather station and military facility in Nunavut, Canada

Alert
- Weather station and signals intelligence base
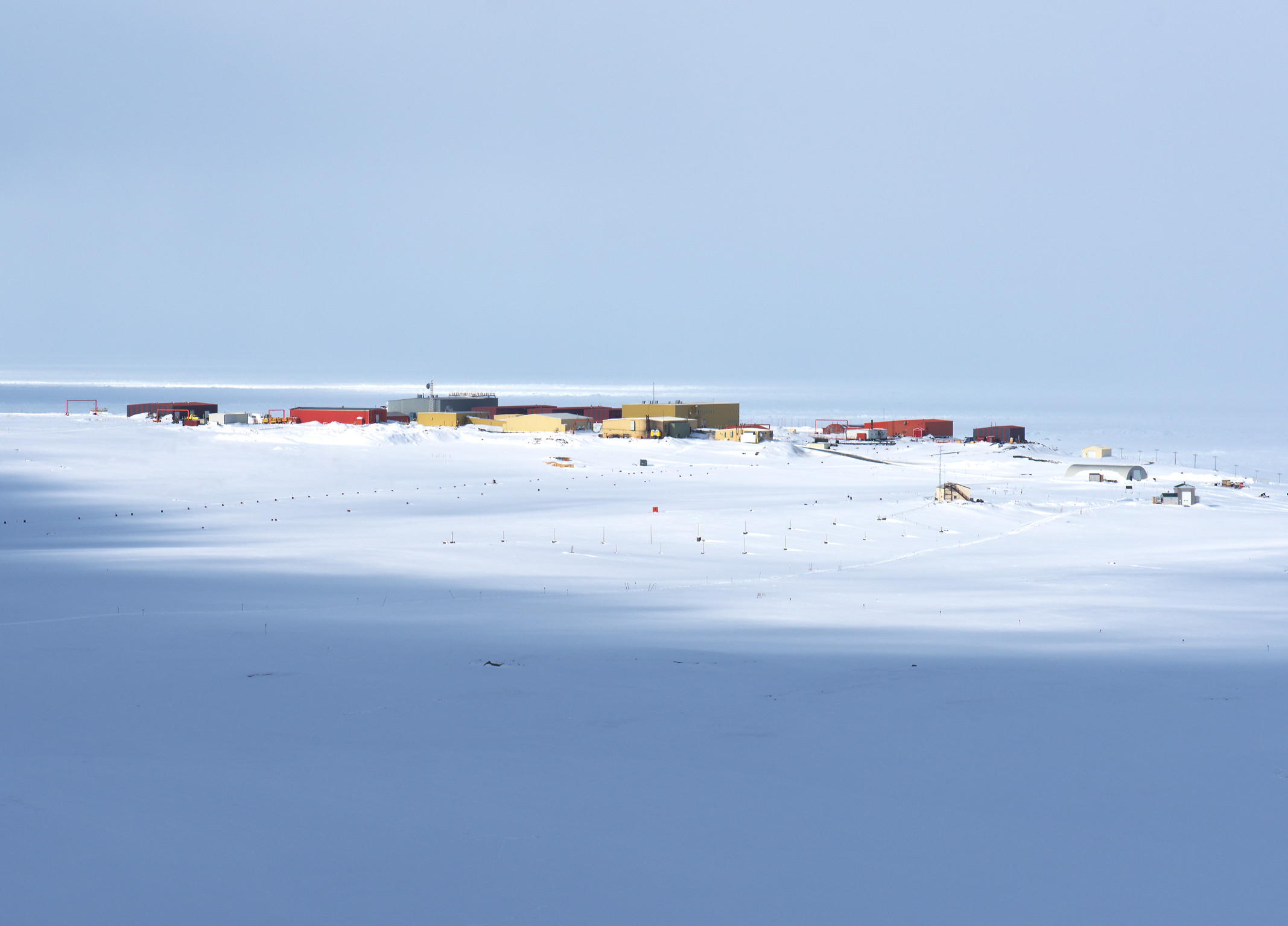
- The main CFS Alert complex from the south, May 2016
- Motto: Inuit Nunangata Ungata (Beyond the Inuit Land)
- Location within Nunavut Location within Canada
- Coordinates: 82°30′N 62°21′W
- Country: Canada
- Territory: Nunavut
- Region: Qikiqtaaluk
- Established: April 9, 1950

Area
  - Total: 55.173 sq mi (142.898 km^{2})
- Elevation: 100 ft (30 m)

Population (2021)
  - Total: 0 (up to 110 non permanent residents) (Note: Alert, Nunavut has no permanent population because it is a remote military and research station, with only temporary personnel present seasonally. Therefore, the population is shown as 0. However, there are usually 65 people in winter and up to 110 in summer.)
- Time zone: UTC−05:00 (EST)
  - Summer (DST): UTC−04:00 (EDT)
- GNBC Code: OAAQK
- Website: www.canada.ca/en/air-force/corporate/alert.html

Alert is a military outpost and weather station in the Qikiqtaaluk Region of Nunavut, Canada. It is the northernmost continuously-inhabited place in the world. The location is on Ellesmere Island (in the Queen Elizabeth Islands) at latitude 82°30'05" north, 817 km (508 mi) from the North Pole. It takes its name from the Royal Navy vessel HMS Alert, which wintered 10 km (6.2 mi) east of the present station off what is now Cape Sheridan in 1875–1876.

All Alert residents are temporary, typically serving three- to six-month tours of duty there. They staff a military signals intelligence radio receiving facility at Canadian Forces Station Alert (CFS Alert, which includes Alert Airport), as well as the Dr. Neil Trivett Global Atmosphere Watch Observatory, a co-located weather station and monitoring observatory, both operated by Environment and Climate Change Canada (ECCC).

In the 2021 census, the permanent population was recorded as 0.

== History ==
Alert is named after HMS Alert, a British ship that wintered about 10 km (6.2 mi) away in 1875–76. The ship's captain, George Nares, and his crew were the first recorded Europeans to reach the northern end of Ellesmere Island. Over the following decades, several other expeditions passed through the area, most notably Robert Peary during his expedition to reach the North Pole in 1909.

=== Post-World War II (1945–1970) ===
Shortly after the end of World War II, Charles J. Hubbard of the United States Weather Bureau aroused interest in the United States and Canada for the establishment of a network of Arctic stations. His plan, in broad perspective, envisaged the establishment of two main stations, one in Greenland and the other on the archipelago, which could be reached by sea supply. These main stations would then serve as advance bases from which a number of smaller stations would be established by air. The immediate plans contemplated the establishment of weather stations only, but it was thought that a system of weather stations would also provide a nucleus of transportation, communications, and settlements, which would greatly aid programs of research in many other fields of science. It was recognized that ultimate action would depend on international cooperation, since the land masses involved were under Canadian and Danish control.

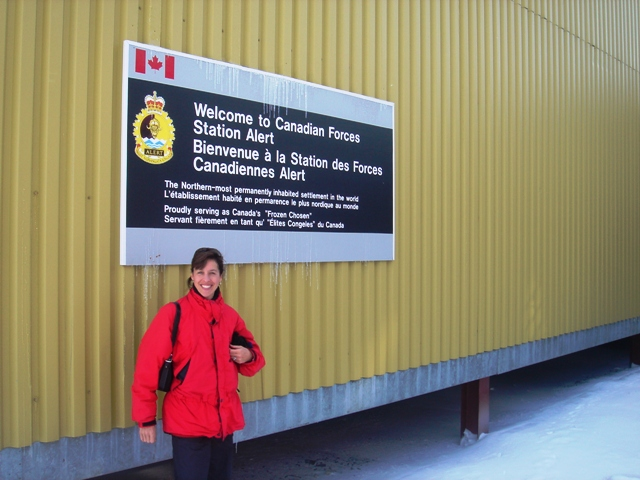
A sign at CFS Alert commemorating Alert as the northernmost permanently inhabited settlement in the world. The area has been inhabited since 1950.

Following negotiations between the United States and Canadian governments, a group of five weather stations was established, known as the Joint Arctic Weather Stations (JAWS). On the Canadian side, the stations were to be operated by the Department of Transport (DOT). The locations for each station were surveyed in 1946, and a cache of supplies was dropped at Alert in 1948 by USS Edisto. Alert was the last of the five to be settled when the first twelve personnel (eight permanent staff and four to assist with construction) arrived on April 9, 1950. Construction began immediately, with the first priority being the creation of an ice runway on Alert Inlet before work began on the permanent all-season runway on Cape Belknap. Until its completion, supplies were parachuted in.

On July 30, 1950, nine crew members of an Avro Lancaster aircraft, operated by the Royal Canadian Air Force (RCAF), died in a crash while making an airdrop of supplies to the station.

The last United States personnel were withdrawn on October 31, 1970, and the following year operation of the weather station was transferred to the newly created Department of the Environment, with the Department of Transport retaining control of airfield operations for several more years.

=== Recent history (1971–present) ===
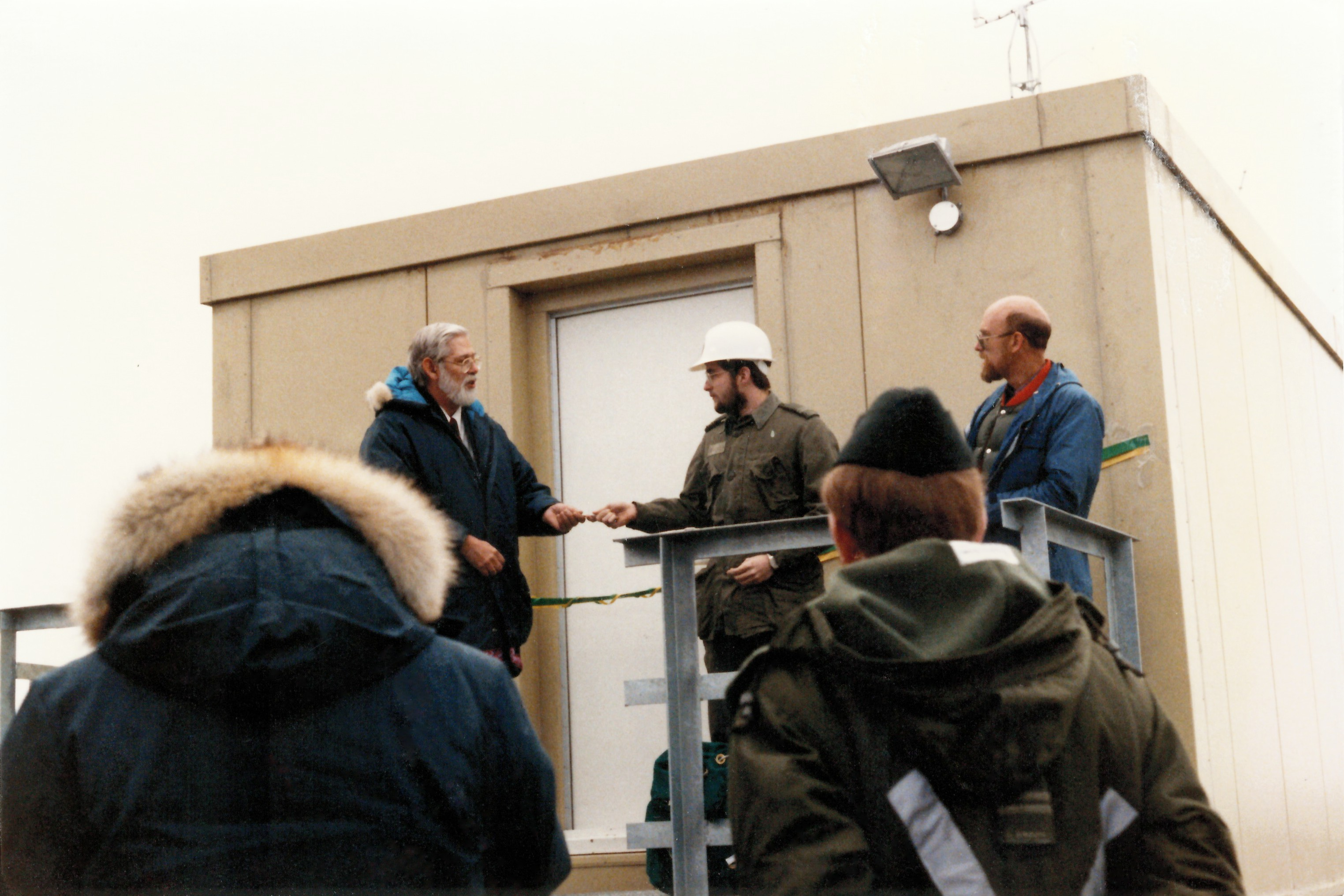
The opening of the Alert Background Air Pollution Monitoring Network in 1986

In April 1971, a party of federal and Northwest Territories (NWT) government officials arrived in Alert in an attempt to reach the North Pole. Alert had been the embarkation point for many North Pole expeditions that relied on weather information supplied by the weather station there. The 1971 expedition was led by Stu Hodgson, former Commissioner of the Northwest Territories, and included in his party were representatives of the prime minister's office, the Canadian Armed Forces, the federal Department of Indian Affairs and Northern Development, as well as a large media group including Pat Carney of Gemini Productions, Ed Ogle of Time magazine, Val Wake of CBC News, and a television crew from California. While waiting in Alert for a weather window to fly to the pole, the party's television crew spent a lot of time filming at the weather station. The military was unhappy about the film crew working on the station, but the weather station was seen as being a sort of no-man's land. The commissioner's party made two attempts to reach the pole and failed. Some of the incidents surrounding this event are recounted in Val Wake's memoir My Voyage around Spray with Apologies to Captain Joshua Slocum.

In August 1975, Prime Minister Pierre Trudeau and his then three-year-old son, future prime minister Justin Trudeau, visited the station and nearby Ward Hunt Island. In August 1986, the Government of Canada opened Alert Background Air Pollution Monitoring Network.

By the 1990s, the original buildings of the weather station had fallen into disrepair and were burned in the summer of 1996, leaving only the hydrogen shed and a wooden outhouse. The weather station and observatory offices were moved to Polaris Hall.

In early April 2006, the Roly McLenahan Torch that was used to light the flame at Whitehorse, Yukon, for the Canada Winter Games, passed through Alert. While the Canada Games torch was supposed to pass over the North Pole, bad weather prevented a Canadian military Twin Otter from making the trip. The torch did not travel outside Alert that weekend (April 9–12). In August 2006, Prime Minister, Stephen Harper, made a visit to Alert as part of his campaign to promote Canadian sovereignty in the north.

On November 8, 2009, the 2010 Winter Olympics torch relay arrived at Alert via airplane from Churchill, Manitoba, reaching its most northerly point on land. The next day it travelled to Iqaluit, Nunavusiaat, and Tassossuaq, Greenland.

On January 19 and 20, 2015, Governor General David Johnston flew into Alert on a C-17 Globemaster transport from CFB Trenton. He toured Alert, received an overview of its operations, met with civilian and military personnel and presided over a change-of-command.

=== Aircraft crashes ===
Since Alert has not been regularly accessible by icebreakers due to heavy ice conditions in the Lincoln Sea, resupply is provided by Royal Canadian Air Force transport aircraft which land at the adjacent Alert Airport. Difficult conditions at such a remote northern location have resulted in several incidents, two of which have involved fatalities:

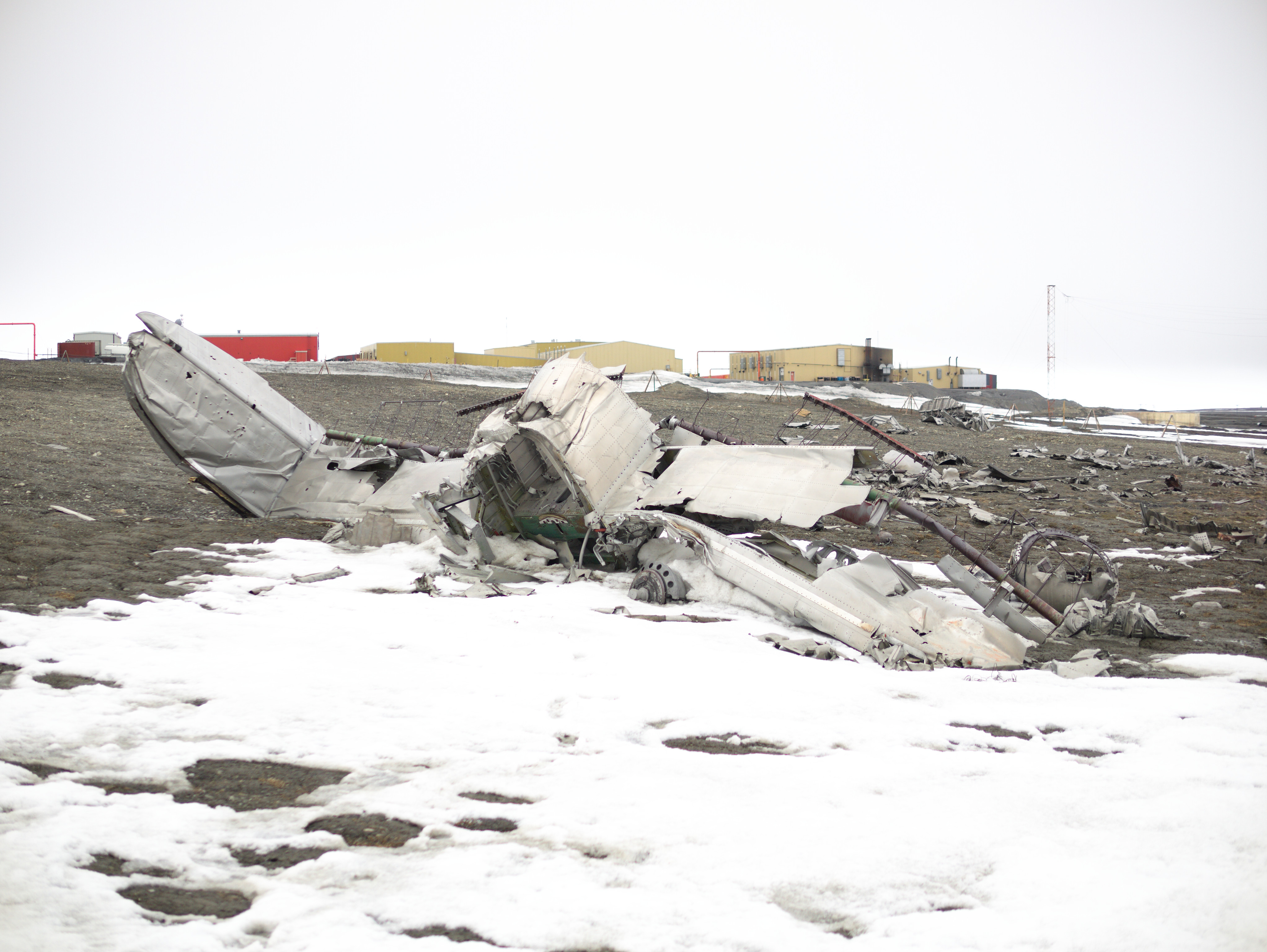
The remains of the Royal Canadian Air Force Lancaster 965, which crashed in July 1950. Difficult Arctic conditions make landings in Alert hazardous.

- On July 31, 1950, around 17:00 GMT, an RCAF Lancaster 965 from 405 Squadron Greenwood crashed during the establishment of the JAWS weather station when a parachute for resupplies being airdropped became entangled on the tail of the aircraft. The nine crew members were killed. An attempt was made to recover their bodies; an RCAF Canso was dispatched and the flying boat landed in Dumbell Bay on August 7. The bodies of the Canadian crew were brought aboard in wooden coffins made from packing crates—the family of Colonel C.J. Hubbard of the United States Weather Bureau requested his remains be buried at Alert—but the combination of the extra weight and a tail wind resulted in an aborted takeoff. The Canso struck ground at the narrow point of Dumbell Bay, damaging the tail section and rendering it useless. Following this, it was decided to bury the crew's remains west of the airstrip, and a military funeral was held the same day. The arrival of the United States Coast Guard icebreaker Eastwind allowed repairs to be made to the Canso. The wreckage of the Lancaster is still visible 500 m (1,600 ft) southwest of the CE building.
- On October 11, 1952, a Douglas C-54 Skymaster, flown by the United States Military Air Transport Service, crashed on landing at Alert, while carrying a load of aviation fuel. The four crew members survived the crash; the aircraft was destroyed. The wreckage was pushed to the south side of the runway, where it remains today. Because of the high visibility of the wreckage due to its location at the runway, it is often mistaken for the RCAF Lancaster.
- On October 30, 1991, a Lockheed C-130 Hercules, part of Operation Boxtop, crashed about 20 km (12 mi) from the airfield, killing four of the 18 passengers and crew on impact. Pilot John Couch died of exposure following the crash. Couch was conducting a visual approach and descended into a hill due to a mistake regarding the plane's true location. A blizzard and the local terrain hampered rescue efforts by personnel from CFS Alert; United States Air Force (USAF) personnel from Thule Air Base 700 km (430 mi) south; 435 Transport and Rescue Squadron from CFB Winnipeg, and 440 Transport and Rescue Squadron, from CFB Namao outside Edmonton (both squadrons are part of 17 Wing Winnipeg); 424 Squadron from CFB Trenton, Ontario; and 413 Transport and Rescue Squadron from CFB Greenwood, Nova Scotia. The crash investigation recommended all C-130s be retrofitted with ground proximity detectors. The crash and rescue efforts were the basis of the film Ordeal in the Arctic (1993).

== Canadian Forces Station Alert ==
Since the beginning of the JAWS project, the Canadian Armed Forces had been interested in the establishment at Alert for several reasons: the JAWS facility extended Canadian sovereignty over a large uninhabited area which Canada claimed as its sovereign territory, and its proximity to the Soviet Union made it of strategic importance. Alert is closer to Moscow (c. 4,000 km (2,500 mi)) than it is to Ottawa (c. 4,150 km (2,580 mi)). Thus, the possibility of utilizing the site for the purpose of intercepting radio signals was deemed to warrant a military presence.

In 1950, Alert Airport was established. It is the only airport serving the settlement and is presently part of CFS Alert. In 1956, the RCAF, which was expanding its presence throughout the high Arctic with the construction of the Distant Early Warning Line radar network, established a building uphill from the DOT's JAWS station to house "High Arctic Long Range Communications Research", or signals intelligence operations.

In 1957, Alert Wireless Station was conceived as an intercept facility to be jointly staffed by personnel from the Royal Canadian Navy (RCN) and the RCAF. Five additional buildings were constructed: a mess, three barracks/accommodations buildings, and a power house and vehicle maintenance building, in addition to the existing operations building, built in 1956. The operations building housed the radio intercept and cryptographic equipment. On September 1, 1958, control of the station was transferred from the air force to the army, and it officially began operations.

The following decade saw a dramatic expansion of the station, with a correspondingly greater number of personnel stationed there. The February 1, 1968, unification of the RCN, RCAF, and Canadian Army to form the Canadian Armed Forces saw Alert Wireless Station change its name to Canadian Forces Station Alert (CFS Alert). Its personnel were no longer drawn from only the air force or navy, but primarily from the Canadian Forces Communications Command.

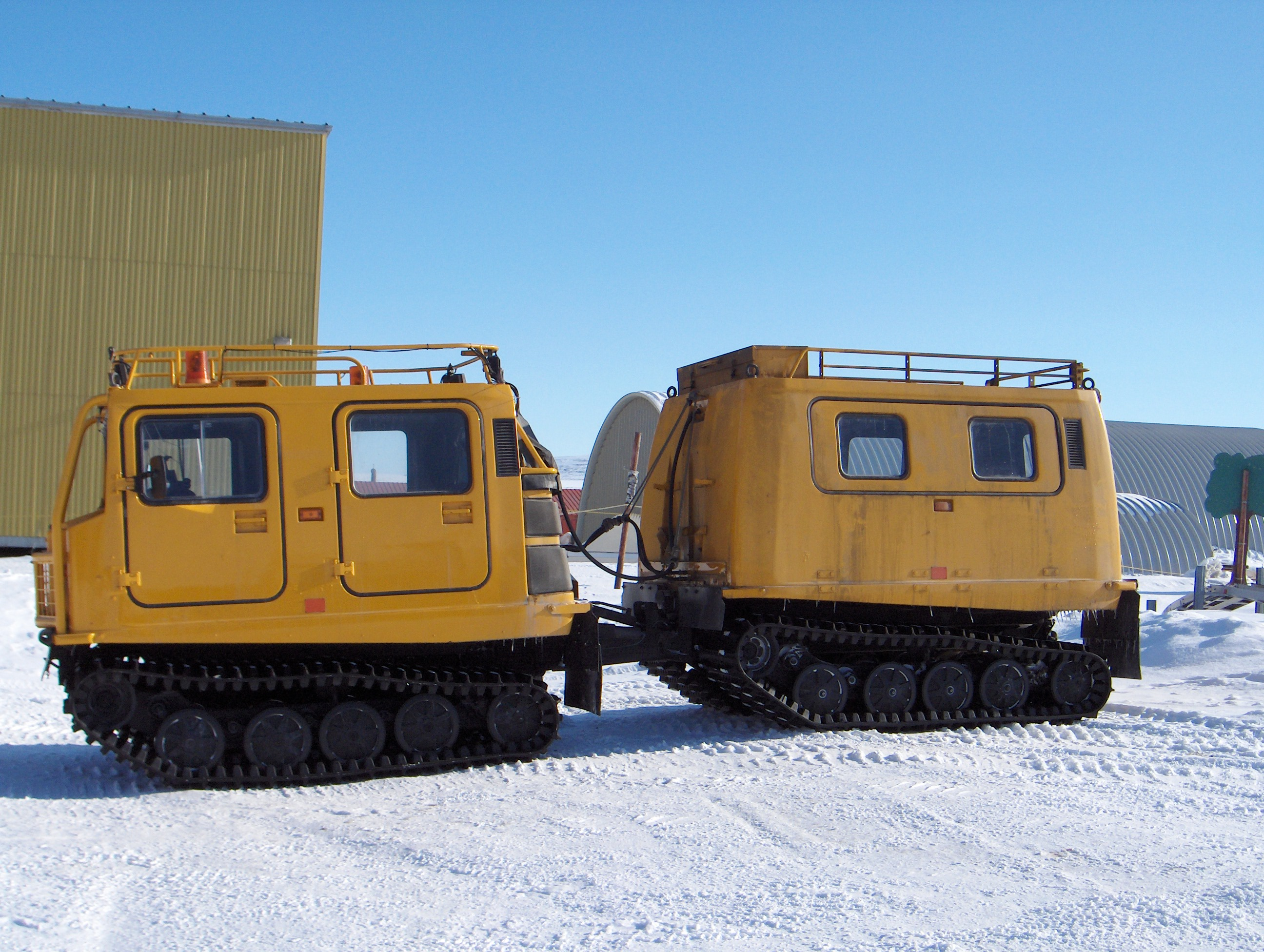
A Bandvagn 206 with CFS Alert in the background, a military station operated by the Canadian Armed Forces

At its peak, CFS Alert had upwards of 215 personnel posted at any one time. The station became a key asset in the global ECHELON network of the AUSCANNZUKUS intelligence sharing alliance, also known as "Five Eyes", with Alert being privy to many secret Soviet communications regarding land-based and sea-based intercontinental ballistic missile (ICBM) test launches and many operational military deployments.

The first military women to serve in Alert arrived in 1980 as part of the Canadian Forces' Women In Non-Traditional Roles study. After its completion in 1983, women were fully authorized to serve in all roles. The first female commanding officer was Major Cathy Cowan, who took command in January 1996. The first female Station Warrant Officer (SWO), MWO Renee Hansen, was appointed in December 2017.

Budget cuts to the Department of National Defence (DND) and Canadian Armed Forces in 1994 and modernization of communications equipment saw CFS Alert downsized to approximately 74 personnel by 1997–1998, when most radio-intercept operations were remotely controlled by personnel at CFS Leitrim. The remaining personnel are responsible for airfield operations, construction/engineering, food service, and logistical/administrative support. As of 2024, there are about 55 people stationed at CFS Alert, and they consist of military personnel, ECCC and other civilian employees.

Only six persons are now responsible for actual operations, and control of the facility was passed to DND's Information Management Group following the disbanding of CF Communications Command with force restructuring and cutbacks in the mid-1990s.

With Canada's commitment to the global war on terrorism following the September 11, 2001, terrorist attacks in New York City and Arlington County, Virginia, CFS Alert has received renewed and increased funding to expand its SIGINT capabilities. On April 1, 2009, the RCAF officially took responsibility for CFS Alert from Canadian Forces Information Operations Group (CFIOG).

=== Civilian contractor ===
On April 13, 2006, the Canadian Broadcasting Corporation reported that the heating costs for the station had risen, as a consequence of which the military proposed to cut back on support trade positions by using private contractors. By 2008, maintenance operations on the station—including food and housekeeping services, vehicle maintenance, powerplant operation, and heating, electrical, and plumbing—had been transferred to a civilian contractor. The contract was initially awarded to Canadian Base Operators (CBO), a subsidiary of Black & McDonald. In 2012, the contract was won by Nasittuq, a subsidiary of ATCO.

=== Dr. Neil Trivett Global Atmosphere Watch Observatory ===
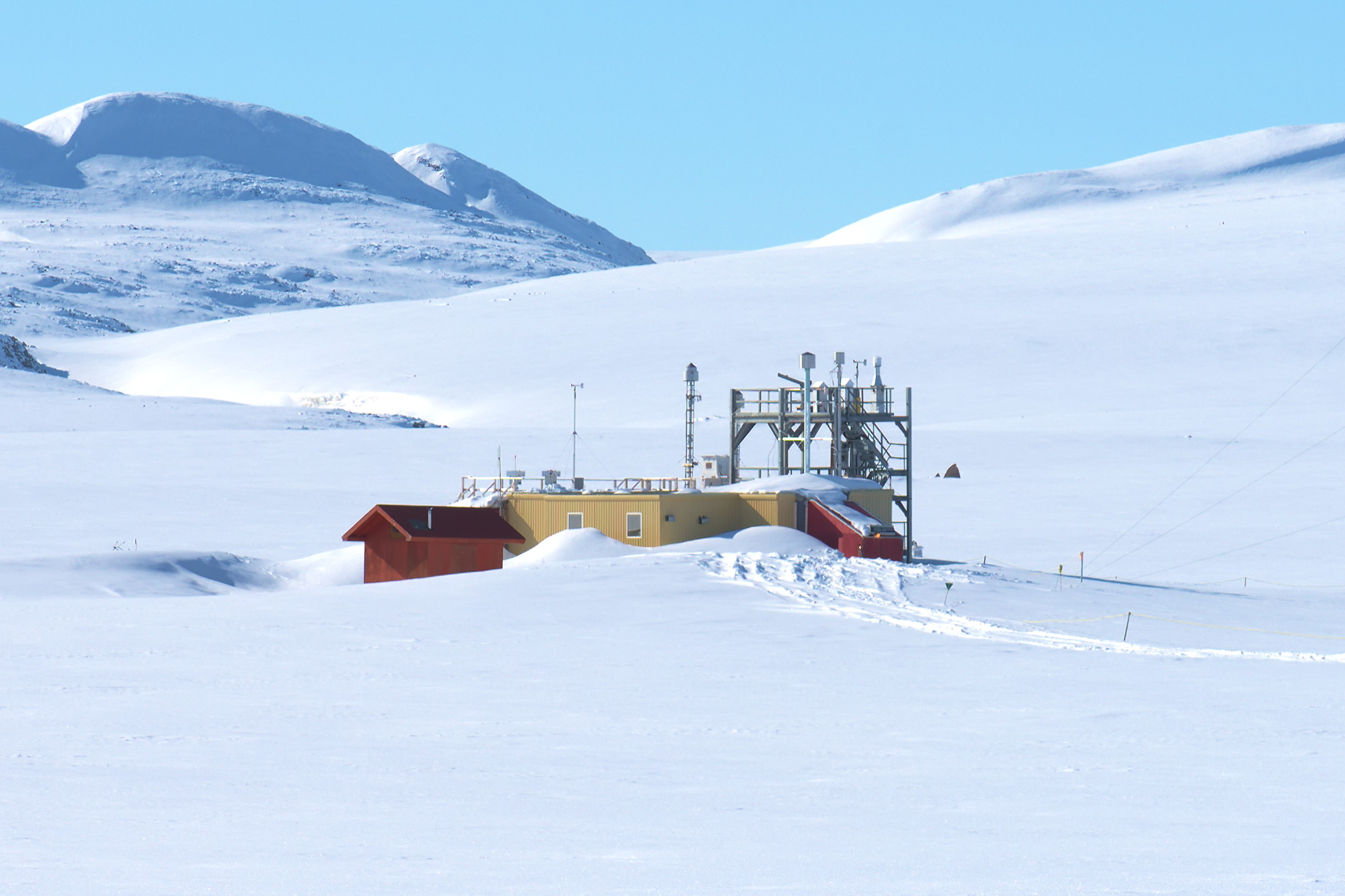
The Dr. Neil Trivett Global Atmosphere Watch Observatory, in June 2016

In 1975, technicians employed by the weather station began collecting flask samples for a greenhouse gas monitoring program. In 1980, this grew to include the weekly collection of filter-based aerosol samples for the Canadian Arctic Aerosol Sampling Network (CAASN).

By 1984, the number of ongoing monitoring programs and the amount of experimental research had outgrown the abilities of the weather station to maintain, and plans were made for the construction of a permanent observatory. This observatory, 400 m (1,300 ft) southwest of Lancaster Hall (more commonly known as the far transmitter building), was opened August 29, 1986. Originally known as the Alert Background Air Pollution Monitoring Network (BAPMoN) Observatory, it was subsequently renamed the Dr. Neil Trivett Global Atmosphere Watch Observatory in honour of the Environment Canada researcher who provided the impetus for its construction. The observatory employs two technicians who reside at CFS Alert, an operator and an assistant operator (normally a university co-op student). It is managed by Environment and Climate Change Canada.

== Demographics ==
Historical populations
Year	Pop.	±%
1991	246	—
1996	270	+9.8%
2001	5	−98.1%
2006	5	+0.0%
2011	0	−100.0%
2016	0	0.00%

While Alert has no permanent residents, it has been continuously inhabited since April 1950. This population, while initially small, grew to upwards of 250 in the 1970s and 1980s, before being downsized in the 1990s when information gathering operations were relayed to CFS Leitrim near Ottawa for collation, reducing the on-site staff considerably. Its current population ranges from a winter minimum of 65 to a summer maximum of 110, plus a variety of short-term visitors, who can swell the total to 150 or more. Alert’s temporary population typically consist of both military personnel and civilians, both making up an almost one-to-one ratio in Alert.

== Geography ==
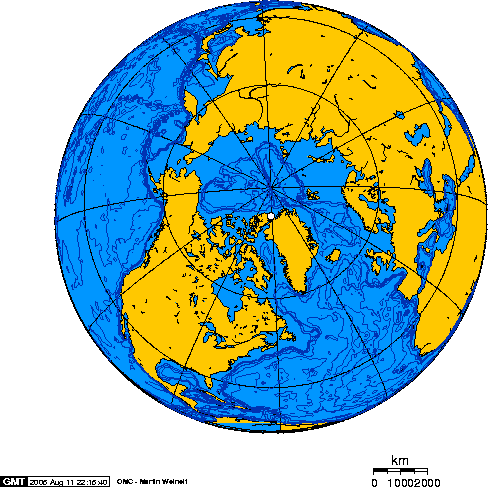
Orthographic projection centred over Alert, Nunavut

Alert is 12 km (7.5 mi) west of Cape Sheridan, the northeastern tip of Ellesmere Island, on the shore of the ice-covered Lincoln Sea. Alert lies just 817 km (508 mi) from the North Pole; the nearest Canadian city is Iqaluit, the capital of the territory of Nunavut, 2,092 km (1,300 mi) distant.

The settlement is surrounded by rugged hills and valleys. The shore is composed primarily of slate and shale. Argillite and greywacke also occur. Some of these rocks are calcareous. The sea is covered with sea ice for most of the year but the ice pack does move out in the summer, leaving open water. Evaporation rates are also very low, as average monthly temperatures are above freezing only in July and August.

Other places on Ellesmere Island are the weather station at Eureka (480 km (300 mi)) and the Inuit community of Grise Fiord, 800 km (500 mi), to the southwest and south, respectively. Siorapaluk (540 km (340 mi) to the south) is the nearest populated place in Greenland. Hans Island which from 2023 has a land border with Greenland, a territory of Denmark, is located 197 km (122 mi) to the south.

== Climate ==
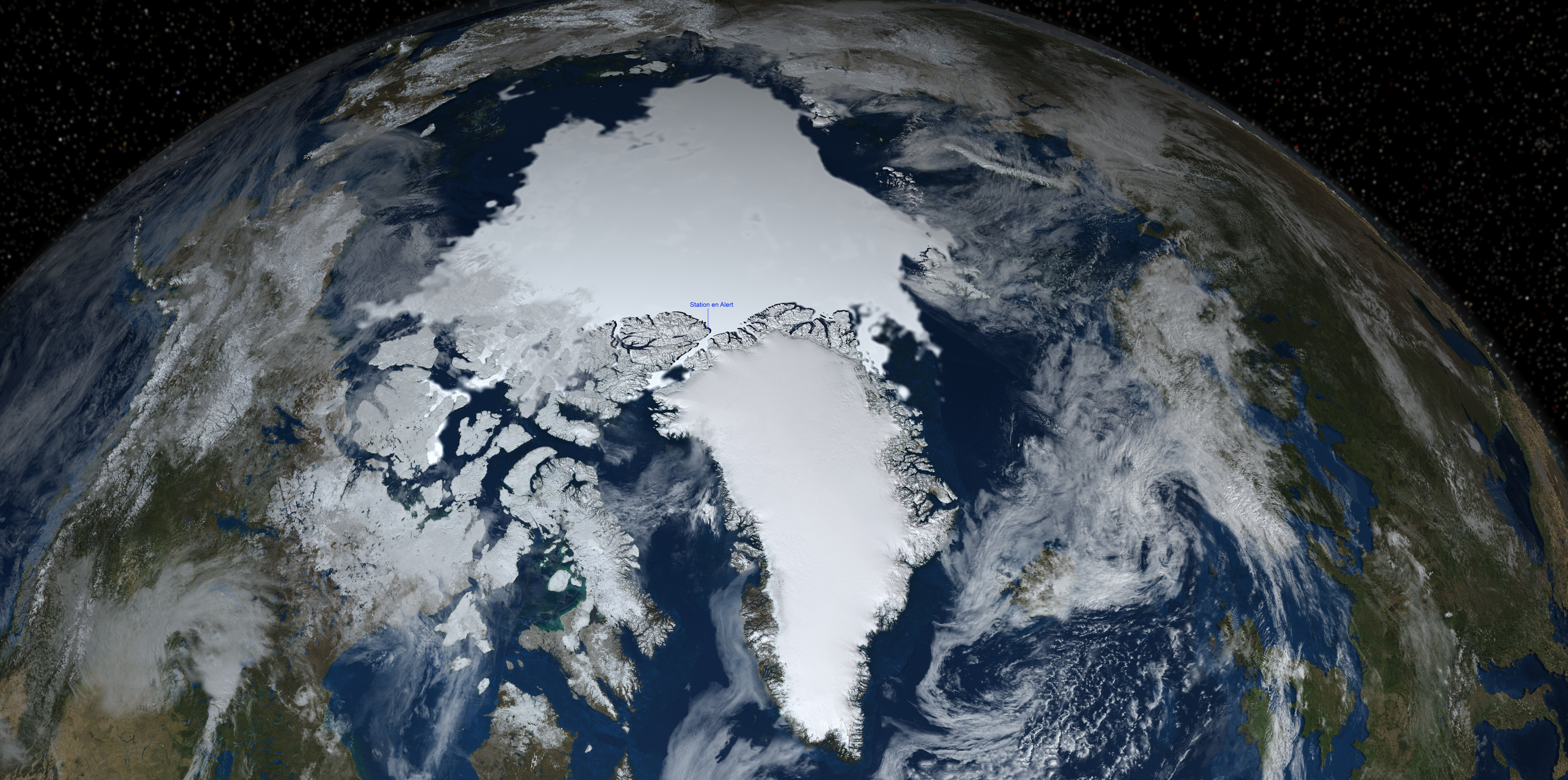
Alert (indicated by small text label near centre of image) within the Arctic region. Composite image showing extent of ice at September 15, 2008.

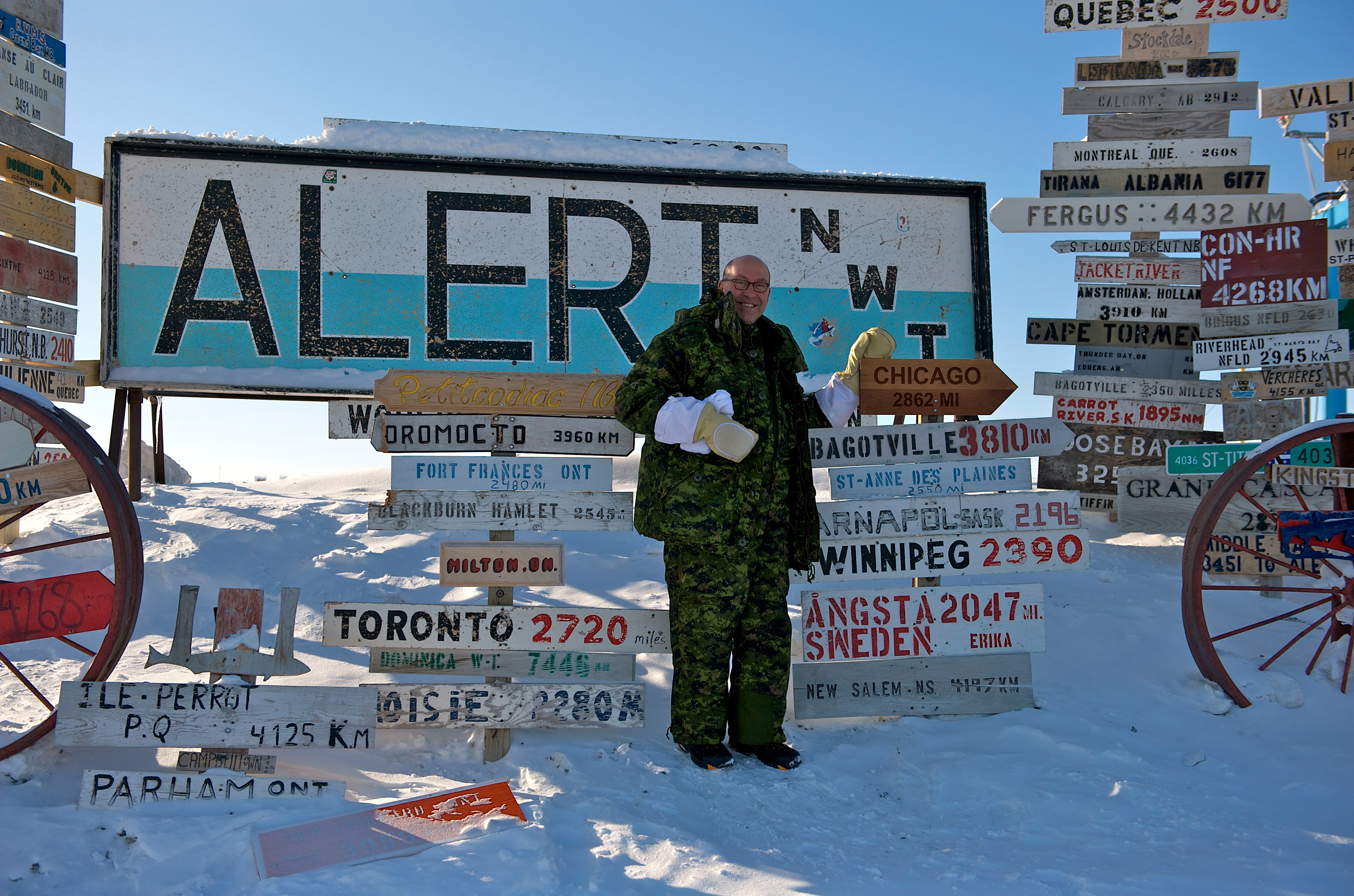
United States Ambassador David Jacobson in front of Alert's welcome sign which features many fingerposts pointing to places worldwide. The sign was erected prior to division and has NWT for the Northwest Territories.

Alert has a polar climate, technically a tundra climate (ET) with characteristics of an ice cap climate (EF). There is complete snow cover for at least 10 months of the year on average and snow from one year persists into the next year in protected areas, but enough melts to prevent glaciation. The warmest month, July, has an average temperature of 3.4 °C (38.1 °F), with only July and August averaging above freezing, and those are also the months where well over 90 per cent of the rainfall, which averages only 17.4 mm (0.69 in) per year, occurs. Rain is rare in June and September and virtually unheard of during the remaining eight months of the year. Alert is the fourth-driest locality in Nunavut and averaging only 158.3 mm (6.23 in) of precipitation per year, the vast majority of this occurring as snow. The heaviest snowfalls occur during July to October, and Alert sees relatively little snowfall during the winter months. September is usually the month with the heaviest snowfall. The relative humidity is so low that door handles are covered in electrical tape to prevent static electricity. February is the coldest month of the year with a mean temperature of −33.2 °C (−27.8 °F). The yearly mean, −17.7 °C (0.1 °F), is the second-coldest in Nunavut after Eureka. Snowfall can occur during any month of the year, and the typical year sees no more than five days in a row without frost. Average highs rise above freezing only in mid-June and drop below freezing at the end of August.

Being far north of the Arctic Circle, Alert experiences polar night from October 14 to February 28, and midnight sun from April 7 to September 4. There are two relatively short periods of twilight from about February 13 to March 22 and the second from September 19 to October 22. Nautical twilight lasts from October 29 to February 11.

Astronomical twilight, where 24 hours are in effect completely dark with only a marginal astronomical twilight, occurs from November 19 to January 22.

Climate data for Alert (Alert Airport) Climate ID: 2400300; coordinates 82°31′04″N 62°16′50″W; elevation: 30.5 m (100 ft); 1991–2020 normals, extremes 1950–present (Note: Climate data 1991–2020 is a composite recorded at Alert Upper Air, Alert Climate (WMO ID: 71082 / 71355; Climate ID: 2400306 / 2400305; coordinates 82°30′N 62°20′W; elevation: 65.4 m (215 ft)), and Alert (Climate ID: 2400300; coordinates 82°31′04″N 62°16′50″W; elevation: 30.5 m (100 ft)))
Month	Jan	Feb	Mar	Apr	May	Jun	Jul	Aug	Sep	Oct	Nov	Dec	Year
Record high humidex	0.0	0.0	−2.4	−1.1	8.1	18.6	20.2	23.8	8.4	4.6	−1.1	1.4	23.8
Record high °C (°F)	1.8 (35.2)	1.1 (34.0)	−2.2 (28.0)	2.4 (36.3)	10.0 (50.0)	18.8 (65.8)	21.0 (69.8)	19.5 (67.1)	11.2 (52.2)	5.3 (41.5)	0.6 (33.1)	3.2 (37.8)	21.0 (69.8)
Mean daily maximum °C (°F)	−27.0 (−16.6)	−27.6 (−17.7)	−27.1 (−16.8)	−19.4 (−2.9)	−8.2 (17.2)	2.4 (36.3)	6.8 (44.2)	3.8 (38.8)	−5.1 (22.8)	−13.6 (7.5)	−20.4 (−4.7)	−24.3 (−11.7)	−13.3 (8.1)
Daily mean °C (°F)	−30.7 (−23.3)	−31.4 (−24.5)	−31.0 (−23.8)	−23.3 (−9.9)	−11.1 (12.0)	0.1 (32.2)	3.9 (39.0)	1.2 (34.2)	−8.0 (17.6)	−17.2 (1.0)	−24.1 (−11.4)	−28.1 (−18.6)	−16.7 (1.9)
Mean daily minimum °C (°F)	−34.4 (−29.9)	−35.2 (−31.4)	−34.9 (−30.8)	−27.0 (−16.6)	−14.0 (6.8)	−2.3 (27.9)	1.0 (33.8)	−1.4 (29.5)	−10.9 (12.4)	−20.7 (−5.3)	−27.8 (−18.0)	−31.9 (−25.4)	−20.0 (−4.0)
Record low °C (°F)	−48.9 (−56.0)	−50.0 (−58.0)	−49.4 (−56.9)	−45.6 (−50.1)	−29.0 (−20.2)	−14.3 (6.3)	−6.3 (20.7)	−15.0 (5.0)	−28.2 (−18.8)	−39.4 (−38.9)	−43.5 (−46.3)	−46.1 (−51.0)	−50.0 (−58.0)
Record low wind chill	−64.7	−60.5	−59.5	−56.8	−40.8	−21.1	−10.3	−19.2	−36.9	−49.4	−53.7	−57.3	−64.7
Average precipitation mm (inches)	10.5 (0.41)	7.3 (0.29)	10.3 (0.41)	11.5 (0.45)	11.6 (0.46)	11.1 (0.44)	21.5 (0.85)	18.4 (0.72)	17.8 (0.70)	12.1 (0.48)	11.5 (0.45)	8.5 (0.33)	152.0 (5.98)
Average rainfall mm (inches)	0.0 (0.0)	0.0 (0.0)	0.0 (0.0)	0.0 (0.0)	0.0 (0.0)	2.3 (0.09)	10.8 (0.43)	5.3 (0.21)	0.2 (0.01)	0.0 (0.0)	0.0 (0.0)	0.0 (0.0)	18.5 (0.73)
Average snowfall cm (inches)	12.7 (5.0)	9.6 (3.8)	12.2 (4.8)	13.2 (5.2)	17.1 (6.7)	11.1 (4.4)	12.8 (5.0)	15.9 (6.3)	30.5 (12.0)	25.5 (10.0)	18.3 (7.2)	13.0 (5.1)	191.7 (75.5)
Average precipitation days (≥ 0.2 mm)	12.4	8.8	11.5	10.1	9.0	7.6	9.6	10.0	11.2	12.3	10.6	10.9	124.1
Average rainy days (≥ 0.2 mm)	0.0	0.0	0.0	0.0	0.1	1.7	5.7	3.4	0.5	0.0	0.0	0.0	11.3
Average snowy days (≥ 0.2 cm)	11.6	9.7	10.2	8.7	9.4	5.4	4.1	6.8	11.5	13.0	10.7	11.1	112.2
Average relative humidity (%) (at 1500 LST)	70.8	70.4	70.1	72.4	81.3	84.5	81.7	84.4	85.3	79.3	73.6	71.8	77.1
Mean monthly sunshine hours	0.0	0.0	110.4	323.6	428.6	333.0	321.6	269.1	111.4	3.9	0.0	0.0	1,901.6
Percentage possible sunshine	0.0	0.0	33.1	46.8	57.6	46.3	43.2	36.2	21.9	4.1	0.0	0.0	24.1
Source: Environment and Climate Change Canada (sun 1981–2010) (April maximum)

== See also ==
- Station Nord, Greenland, the second-northernmost permanent settlement in the world
- Ny-Ålesund, Svalbard, the northernmost settlement/town in the world with a permanent population of civilians
- Puerto Williams, Chile, the southernmost settlement on Earth
