= Eureka, Nunavut =

Research station in Canada

Eureka
- Research / weather station
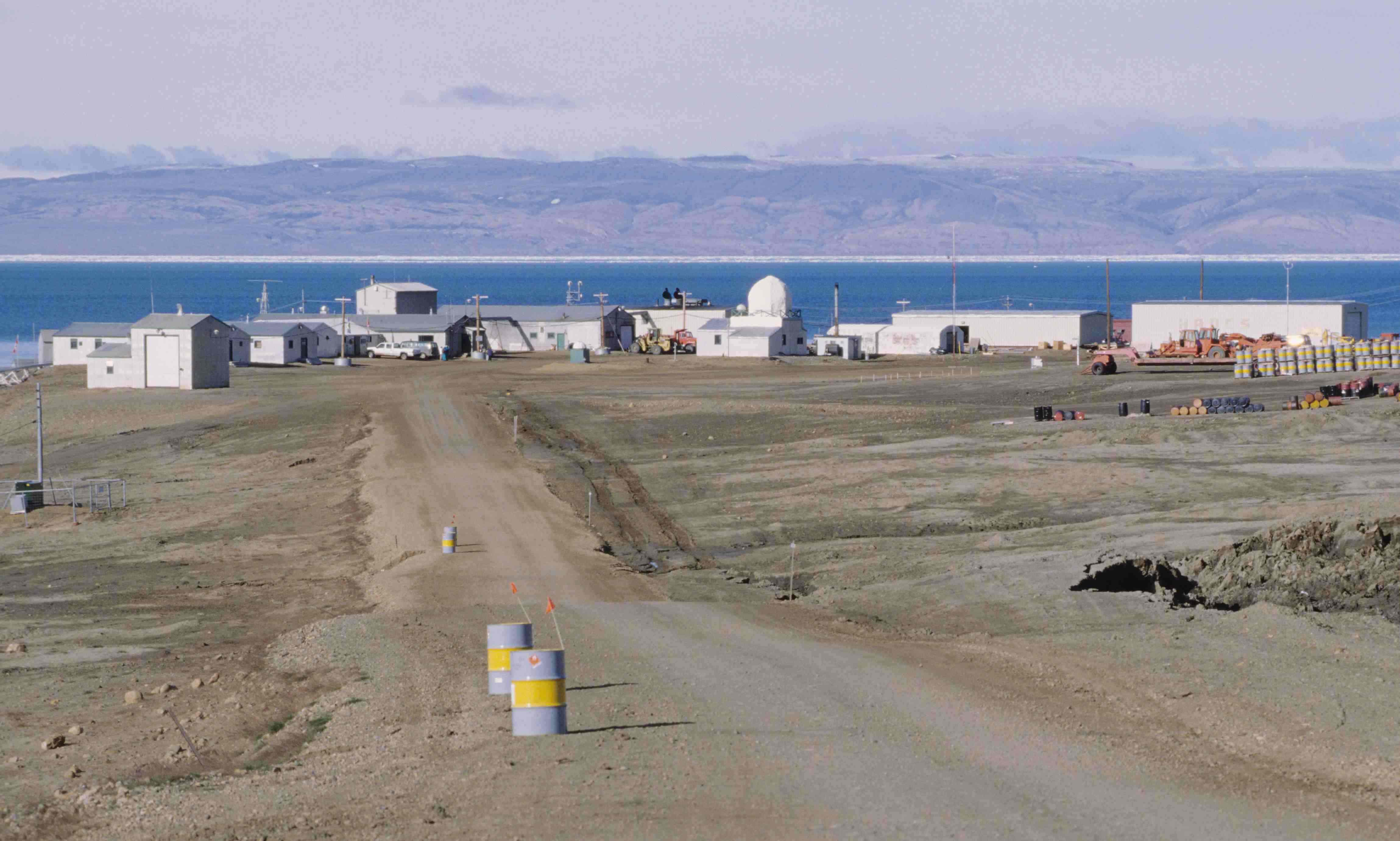
- Eureka seen from its airfield

- Location within Nunavut Location within Canada
- Coordinates: 79°50′N 85°57′W
- Country: Canada
- Territory: Nunavut
- Region: Qikiqtaaluk Region
- Island group: Queen Elizabeth Islands
- Founded: April 11, 1947
- Elevation: 83 m (272 ft)

Population
  - Total: 8
- Time zone: UTC−05:00 (EST)
- Postal code: X0A 0G0.
- Area code: 867
- Elevation is at Eureka Aerodrome.

Eureka is a small research base on Fosheim Peninsula, Ellesmere Island, Qikiqtaaluk Region, in the Canadian territory of Nunavut. It is located on the north side of Slidre Fiord, which enters Eureka Sound farther west. It is the third-northernmost permanent research community in the world. The only two farther north are Alert, which is also on Ellesmere Island, and Nord, in Greenland. Eureka has the lowest average annual temperature and the lowest amount of precipitation of any weather station in Canada.

Eureka's postal code is X0A 0G0 and the area code is 867.

== Divisions ==
The base consists of three areas:

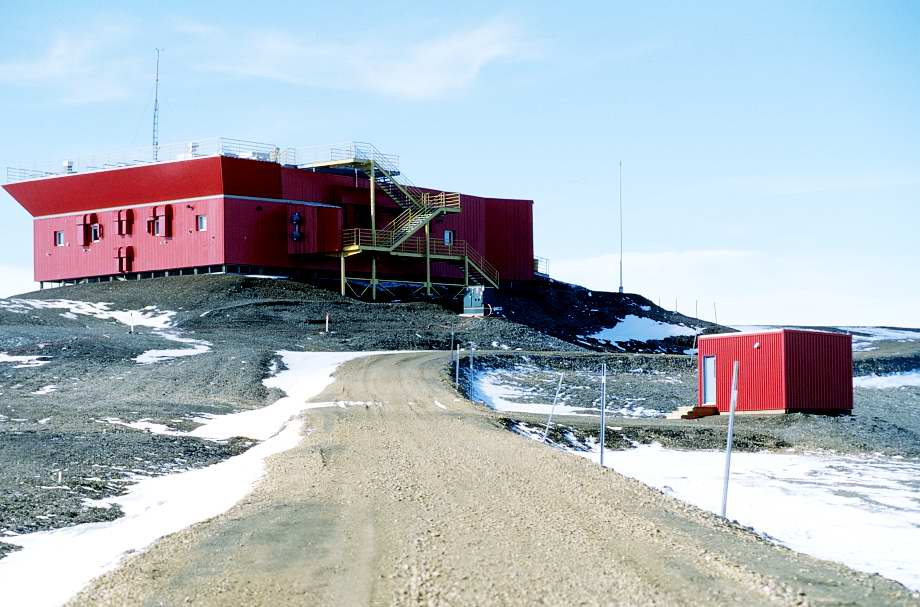
"PEARL", Polar Environment Atmospheric Research Laboratory (Canadian Network for Detection of Atmospheric Change)

- the Eureka Aerodrome, which includes "Fort Eureka" (the quarters for military personnel maintaining the island's communications equipment)
- the Environment and Climate Change Canada Weather Station
- the Polar Environment Atmospheric Research Laboratory (PEARL), formerly the Arctic Stratospheric Ozone Observatory (AStrO)

PEARL is operated by a consortium of Canadian university researchers and government agencies known as the Canadian Network for Detection of Atmospheric Change. PEARL announced it would cease full-time year-round operation as of April 30, 2012, due to lack of funding, but this decision was reversed in May 2013 with the announcement of new funds.

== History ==
Eureka was founded on April 7, 1947, as part of an initiative to set up a network of Arctic weather stations. On this date, 100 t (98 long tons; 110 short tons) of supplies were airlifted to a promising spot on Ellesmere Island, and five prefabricated Jamesway huts were constructed. Regular weather observations began on January 1, 1948. The station has expanded over the years. At its peak, in the 1970s, at least fifteen staff were on site; in 2005, it reported a permanent population of zero with at least eight staff on a continuous rotational basis.

Several generations of buildings have been developed. The latest operations centre, with work areas and staff quarters in one large structure, was completed in 2005.

== Location and accessibility ==
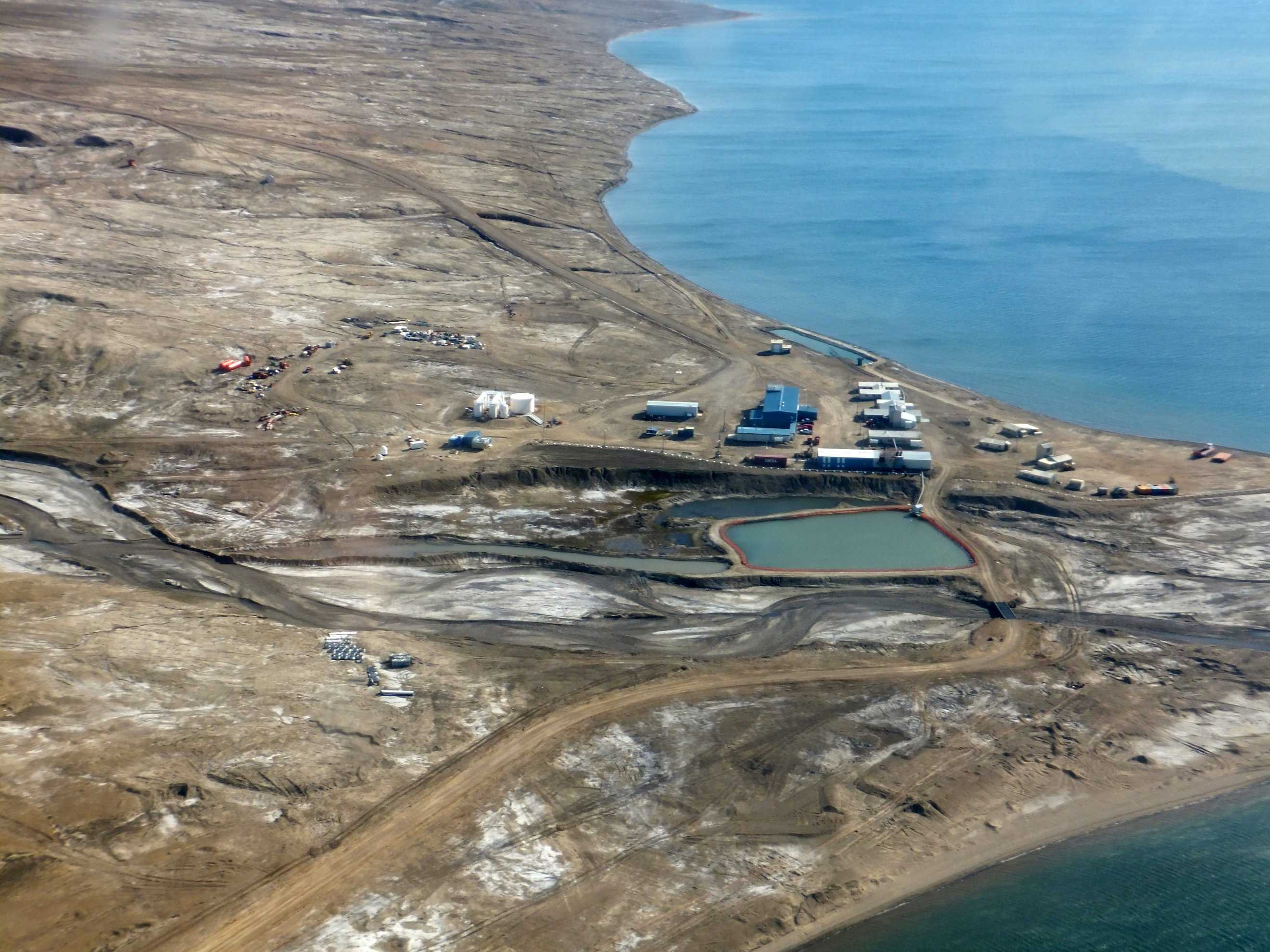
Eureka from the air, 2007

The complex is powered by diesel generators. The station is supplied once every six weeks with fresh food and mail by air, and annually in the late summer, a supply ship from Montreal brings heavy supplies. On July 3, 2009, a Danish Challenger 604 MMA jet landed at Eureka's aerodrome. The jet is a military observation aircraft based on the Challenger executive jet. This jet visited Eureka on a familiarization trip, in order to prepare for the possibility of Danish aircraft assisting in search and rescue missions over Canadian territory. The Canadian American Strategic Review noted critically that the first jet to fly a mission to Eureka was not Canadian.

At Eureka's latitude, a geosynchronous communications satellite, if due south, would require an antenna to be pointed nearly horizontally; satellites farther east or west along that orbit would be below the horizon. Telephone access and television broadcasts arrived in 1982 when Operation Hurricane resulted in the establishment of a satellite receiving station at nearby Skull Point, which has an open view to the south. The low-power Channel 9 TV transmitter at Skull Point was the world's northernmost TV station at the time. In the 1980s, TV audio was often connected to the telephone to feed CBC-TV news to CHAR-FM in isolated CFS Alert. More recently, CANDAC has installed what is likely the world's most northerly geosynchronous satellite ground-station to provide Internet-based communications to PEARL.

Other inhabited places on Ellesmere Island include Alert and Grise Fiord.

== Flora and fauna ==
Eureka has been described as "The Garden Spot of the Arctic" due to the flora and fauna abundant around the Eureka area, more so than anywhere else in the High Arctic. Fauna include polar bears, muskox, Arctic wolves, Arctic foxes, Arctic hares, and lemmings. In addition, summer nesting geese, ducks, owls, loons, ravens, gulls and many other smaller birds nest, raise their young, and return south in August.

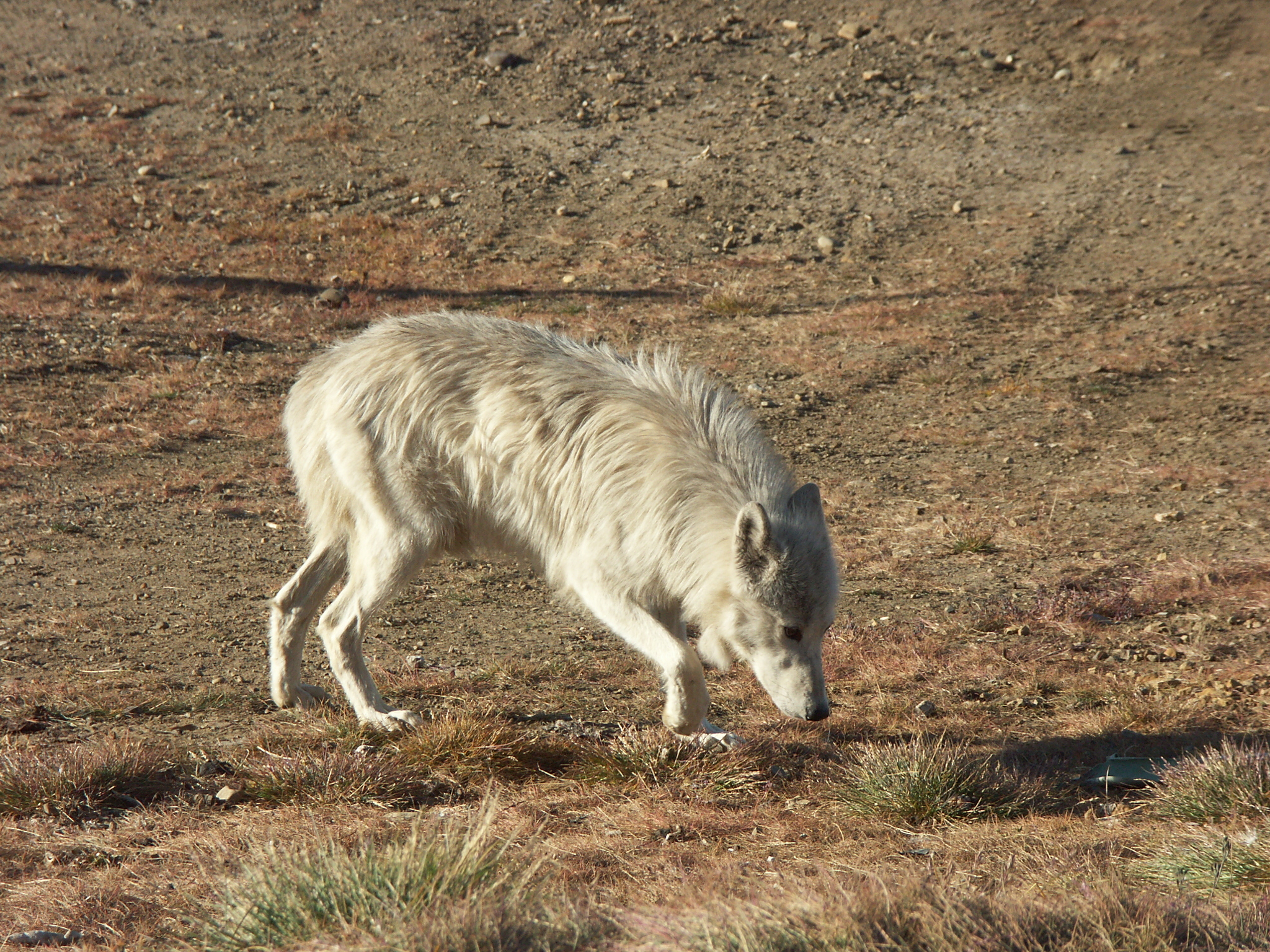
Arctic Wolf
Canis lupus arctos
Eureka, Nunavut

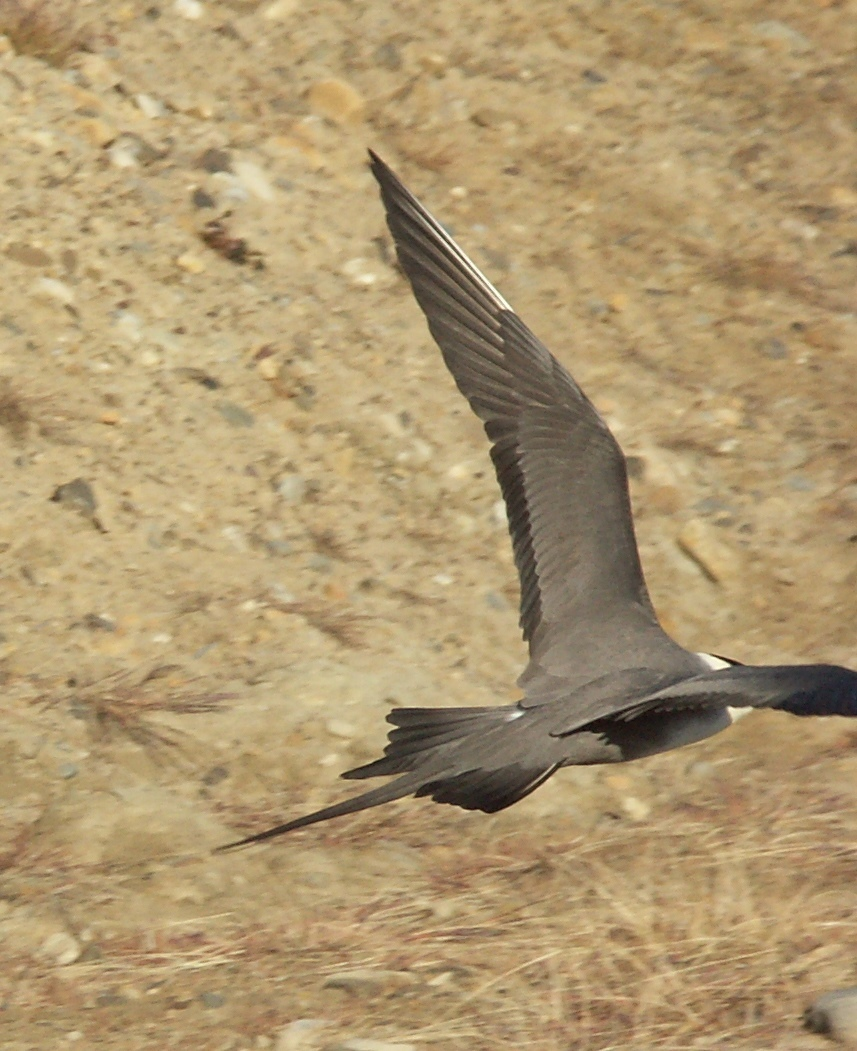
Long-tailed Jaeger
Stercorarius longicaudus
Eureka, Nunavut

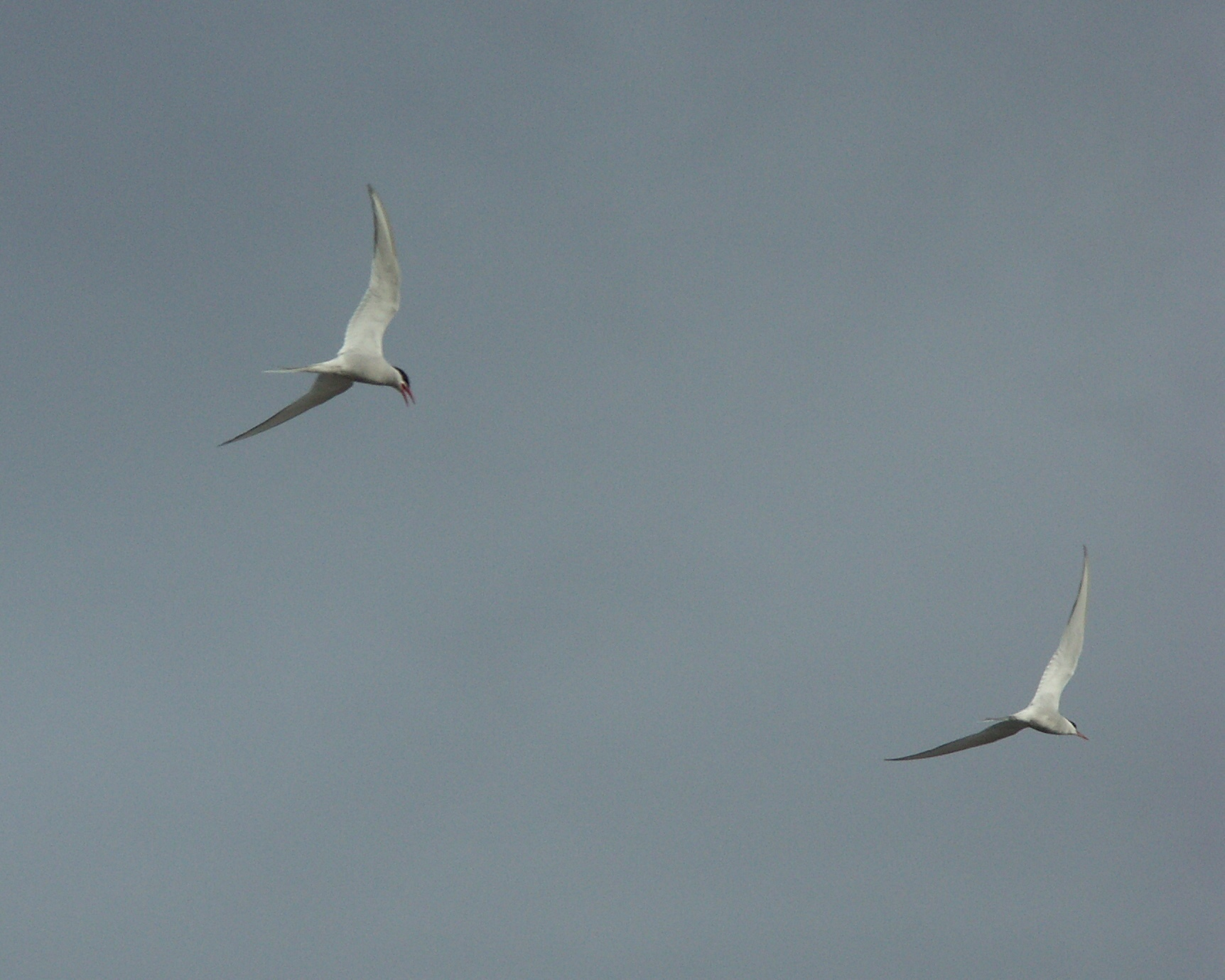
Arctic Terns
Sterna paradisaea
Eureka, Nunavut

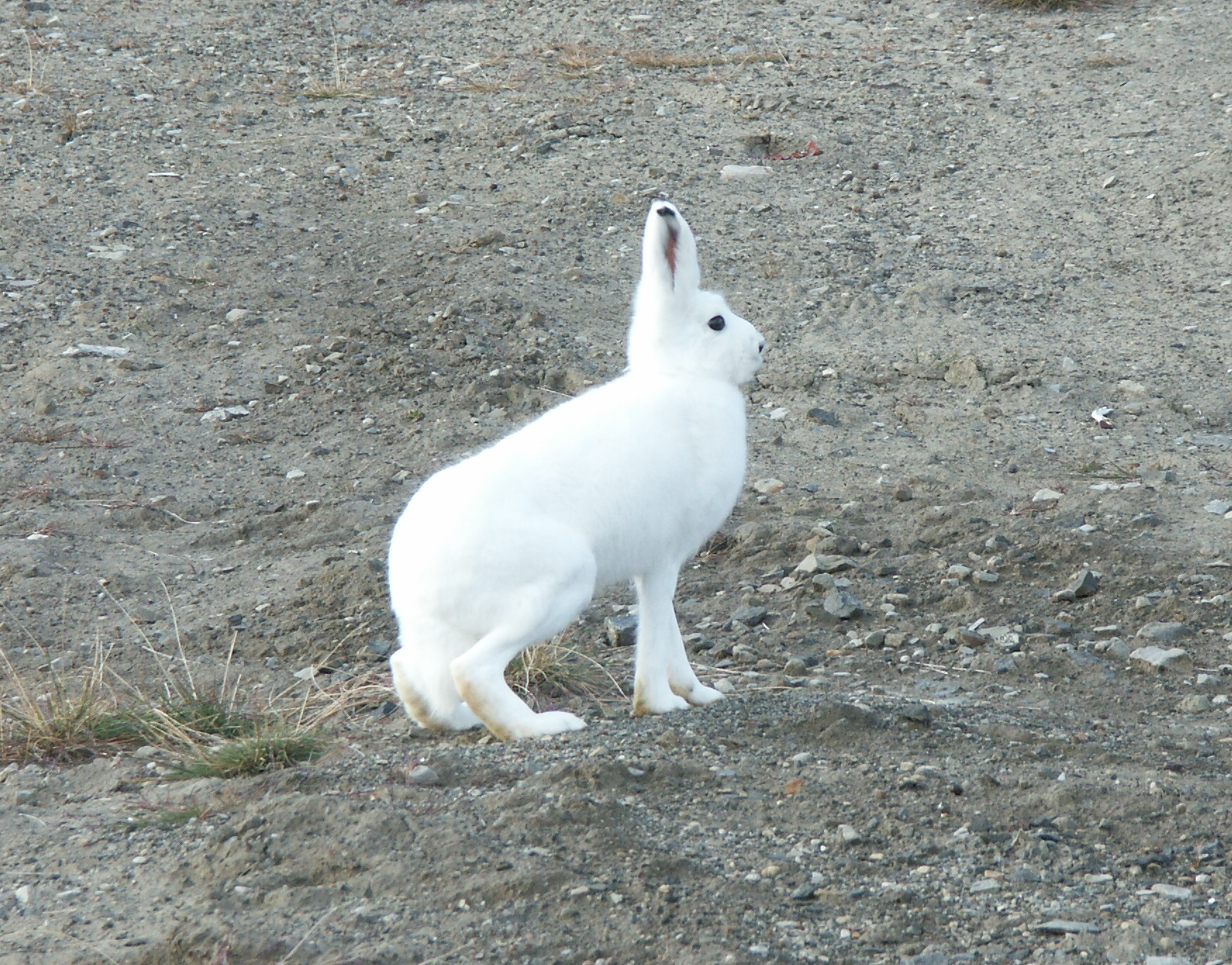
Arctic Hare
Lepus arcticus
Eureka, Nunavut

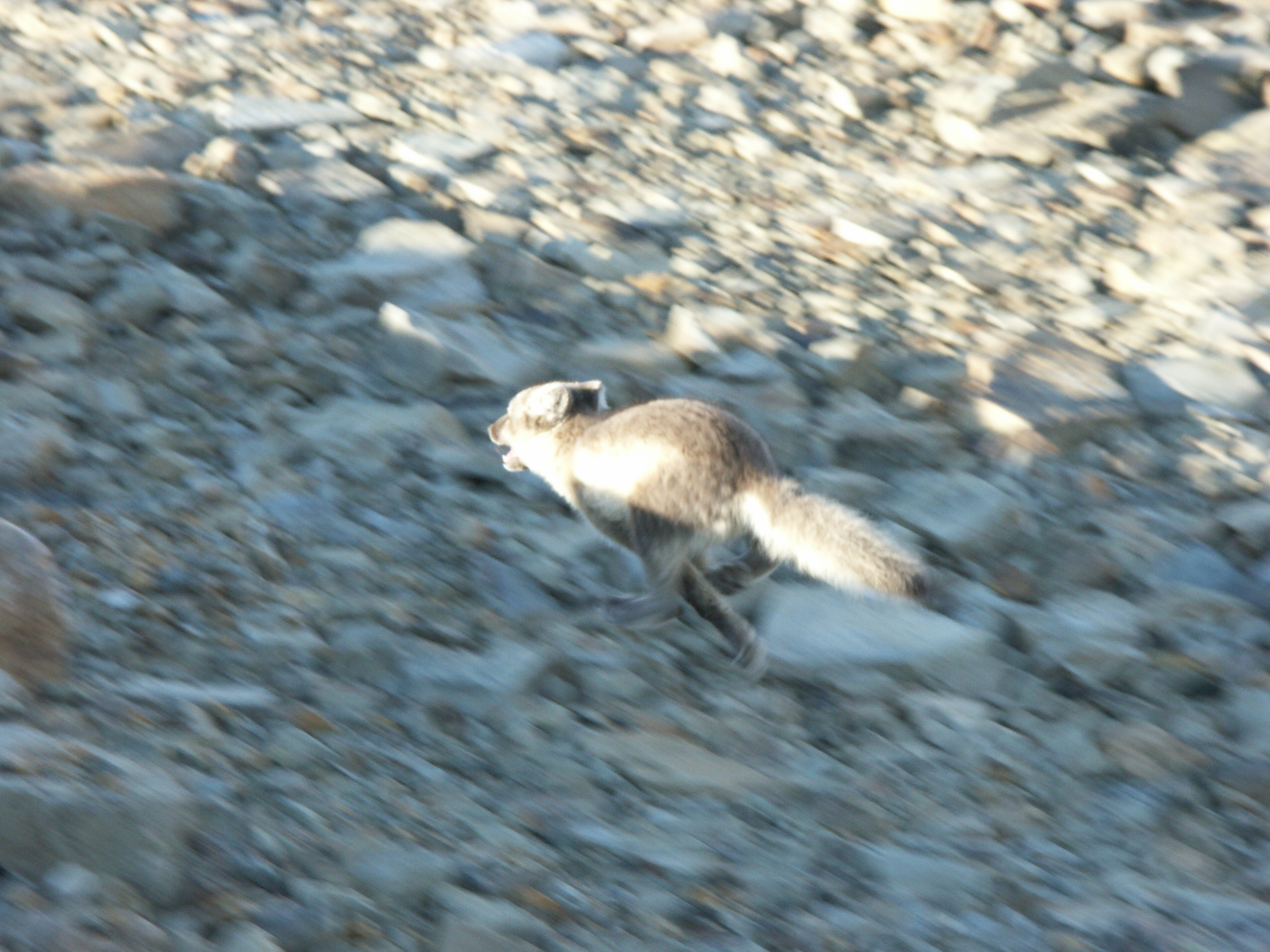
Arctic Fox
Vulpes lagopus
Eureka, Nunavut

== Climate ==
Eureka experiences a polar climate (ET). The settlement sees the midnight sun between April 10 and August 29, with no sunlight at all between mid-October and late February. Eureka has the lowest average annual temperature and least precipitation of any weather station in Canada with an annual mean temperature of −18.1 °C (−0.6 °F). In fact, that is even colder than the Siberian "poles of cold", Verkhoyansk and Oymyakon with an average annual temperature of −13.7 °C (7.3 °F) and −14.9 °C (5.2 °F) respectively. Although the latter two have colder winter (December, January, February) temperatures than Eureka (−35.2 °C (−31.4 °F), −43.5 °C (−46.3 °F), and −44.3 °C (−47.7 °F) respectively). Average winter temperatures are almost comparable to those found in northeastern Siberia. However, summers are slightly warmer than other places in the Arctic Archipelago because Eureka is somewhat landlocked, being near the centre of Ellesmere Island. Even so, since record keeping began, the temperature has never exceeded 20.9 °C (69.6 °F), first reached on July 14, 2009. Although a polar desert, evaporation is also very low, which allows the limited moisture to be made available for plants and wildlife. Its frost-free season averages 56 days, much longer than many other places nearby.

Climate data for Eureka (Eureka Aerodrome) WMO ID: 71917; coordinates 79°59′N 85°56′W; elevation: 10.4 m (34 ft); 1991–2020 normals, extremes 1947–present
Month	Jan	Feb	Mar	Apr	May	Jun	Jul	Aug	Sep	Oct	Nov	Dec	Year
Record high humidex	−1.1	−1.1	−8.5	−3.0	7.3	17.9	20.8	17.4	7.2	4.8	−3.9	−4.0	20.8
Record high °C (°F)	−1.1 (30.0)	−1.1 (30.0)	−8.0 (17.6)	−2.8 (27.0)	7.5 (45.5)	18.5 (65.3)	20.9 (69.6)	17.6 (63.7)	9.3 (48.7)	5.0 (41.0)	−1.7 (28.9)	−2.1 (28.2)	20.9 (69.6)
Mean daily maximum °C (°F)	−32.3 (−26.1)	−33.0 (−27.4)	−32.3 (−26.1)	−21.9 (−7.4)	−6.7 (19.9)	5.8 (42.4)	10.1 (50.2)	5.7 (42.3)	−3.3 (26.1)	−15.9 (3.4)	−24.3 (−11.7)	−29.2 (−20.6)	−14.8 (5.4)
Daily mean °C (°F)	−35.9 (−32.6)	−36.8 (−34.2)	−35.9 (−32.6)	−25.9 (−14.6)	−9.9 (14.2)	3.1 (37.6)	6.8 (44.2)	3.4 (38.1)	−5.8 (21.6)	−19.5 (−3.1)	−28.0 (−18.4)	−32.8 (−27.0)	−18.1 (−0.6)
Mean daily minimum °C (°F)	−39.5 (−39.1)	−40.5 (−40.9)	−39.4 (−38.9)	−29.8 (−21.6)	−13.1 (8.4)	0.5 (32.9)	3.5 (38.3)	1.2 (34.2)	−8.2 (17.2)	−23.1 (−9.6)	−31.6 (−24.9)	−36.3 (−33.3)	−21.4 (−6.5)
Record low °C (°F)	−53.3 (−63.9)	−55.3 (−67.5)	−52.8 (−63.0)	−48.9 (−56.0)	−31.1 (−24.0)	−13.9 (7.0)	−2.2 (28.0)	−12.9 (8.8)	−31.7 (−25.1)	−41.7 (−43.1)	−48.2 (−54.8)	−51.7 (−61.1)	−55.3 (−67.5)
Record low wind chill	−72.1	−69.5	−66.9	−59.3	−43.2	−20.7	−7.0	−17.4	−40.3	−52.1	−61.3	−66.3	−72.1
Average precipitation mm (inches)	2.6 (0.10)	2.6 (0.10)	2.6 (0.10)	3.6 (0.14)	3.3 (0.13)	8.6 (0.34)	14.4 (0.57)	17.9 (0.70)	8.2 (0.32)	6.6 (0.26)	3.7 (0.15)	3.5 (0.14)	77.6 (3.06)
Average rainfall mm (inches)	0.0 (0.0)	0.0 (0.0)	0.0 (0.0)	0.0 (0.0)	0.0 (0.0)	6.1 (0.24)	14.0 (0.55)	13.1 (0.52)	0.3 (0.01)	0.0 (0.0)	0.0 (0.0)	0.0 (0.0)	33.5 (1.32)
Average snowfall cm (inches)	3.7 (1.5)	3.9 (1.5)	4.0 (1.6)	4.4 (1.7)	4.7 (1.9)	2.8 (1.1)	1.0 (0.4)	5.5 (2.2)	11.3 (4.4)	10.1 (4.0)	5.6 (2.2)	5.5 (2.2)	62.5 (24.6)
Average precipitation days (≥ 0.2 mm)	4.4	4.4	5.3	4.9	3.9	5.2	7.8	7.9	6.8	8.6	5.9	5.4	70.6
Average rainy days (≥ 0.2 mm)	0.0	0.0	0.0	0.0	0.0	3.5	7.7	6.0	0.16	0.0	0.0	0.0	17.4
Average snowy days (≥ 0.2 cm)	4.5	4.8	5.2	4.8	4.0	2.3	0.79	2.8	7.1	9.0	6.2	5.2	56.8
Average relative humidity (%) (at 1500 LST)	64.5	66.5	66.2	64.9	71.9	70.3	67.4	75.7	81.7	75.0	66.9	66.5	69.8
Mean monthly sunshine hours	0.0	0.0	118	355.1	520.7	405	341.2	240.1	101.8	8.6	0.0	0.0	2,090.5
Source: Environment and Climate Change Canada (sun 1951–1980)

== See also ==
- List of research stations in the Arctic

== Bibliography ==
- Couture, Nicole J. Sensitivity of Permafrost Terrain in a High Arctic Polar Desert An Evaluation of Response to Disturbance Near Eureka, Ellesmere Island, Nunavut. Ottawa: National Library of Canada = Bibliothèque nationale du Canada, 2003. ISBN 0-612-70405-X
- Whyte, L. G., B. Goalen, J. Hawari, D. Labbe, C. W. Greer, and M. Nahir. 2001. "Bioremediation Treatability Assessment of Hydrocarbon-Contaminated Soils from Eureka, Nunavut". Cold Regions Science and Technology. 32, no. 2-3: 121–132.
- Eureka at the Atlas of Canada
