= Alert Airport =

Airport in Alert, Nunavut, Canada

- IATA: YLT; ICAO: CYLT; WMO: 71355

Summary
- Airport type: Military
- Operator: DND / 1CdnAirDiv Alert; AMO Ottawa
- Location: Alert, Nunavut
- Time zone: EST (UTC−05:00)
  - Summer (DST): EDT (UTC−04:00)
- Elevation AMSL: 100 ft (30 m)
- Coordinates: 82°31′02″N 062°17′04″W

Map
- Location in Nunavut

Runways
| Direction | Length | | Surface |
| Direction | ft | m | Surface |
|---|---|---|---|
| 05/23 | 5,500 | 1,676 | Gravel |
- Source: Canada Flight Supplement; Environment Canada

Alert Airport (IATA: YLT, ICAO: CYLT) is located at Alert, Nunavut, Canada, approximately 830 kilometres (520 miles) south of the true North Pole. It is operated by the Canadian Department of National Defence and is part of Canadian Forces Station Alert. A weather station was established on the site in 1950, and in 1957 construction began on the military facilities which are still in use as of 2025. It is the northernmost airport in the world, although not used by public scheduled flights.

== Facilities ==
Radar and navigation equipment are trailer units that can be moved around the airport. The airport's fire and rescue operations are supported by a 2012 KME/Fort Garry Fire Truck aircraft rescue and firefighting (ARFF). Two bulldozers are used to grade the runway when needed.

== Incidents ==
There have been two crashes involving fatalities at the airfield since it was established.

- July 31, 1950 – Royal Canadian Air Force Avro Lancaster AG-965 on a re-supply flight crashed, killing all nine on board (crew members and passengers).
- October 30, 1991 – "Boxtop 22", a Lockheed C-130 Hercules from CFB Trenton on re-supply mission crashed, killing five on board.

== See also ==
- List of airports in Nunavut
- Pituffik Space Base, formerly Thule Air Base, a United States base in Greenland
