= CFS Alert =

Canadian Forces Station in Nunavut, Canada

CFS Alert Station des Forces canadiennes Alert
- Canadian Forces Station
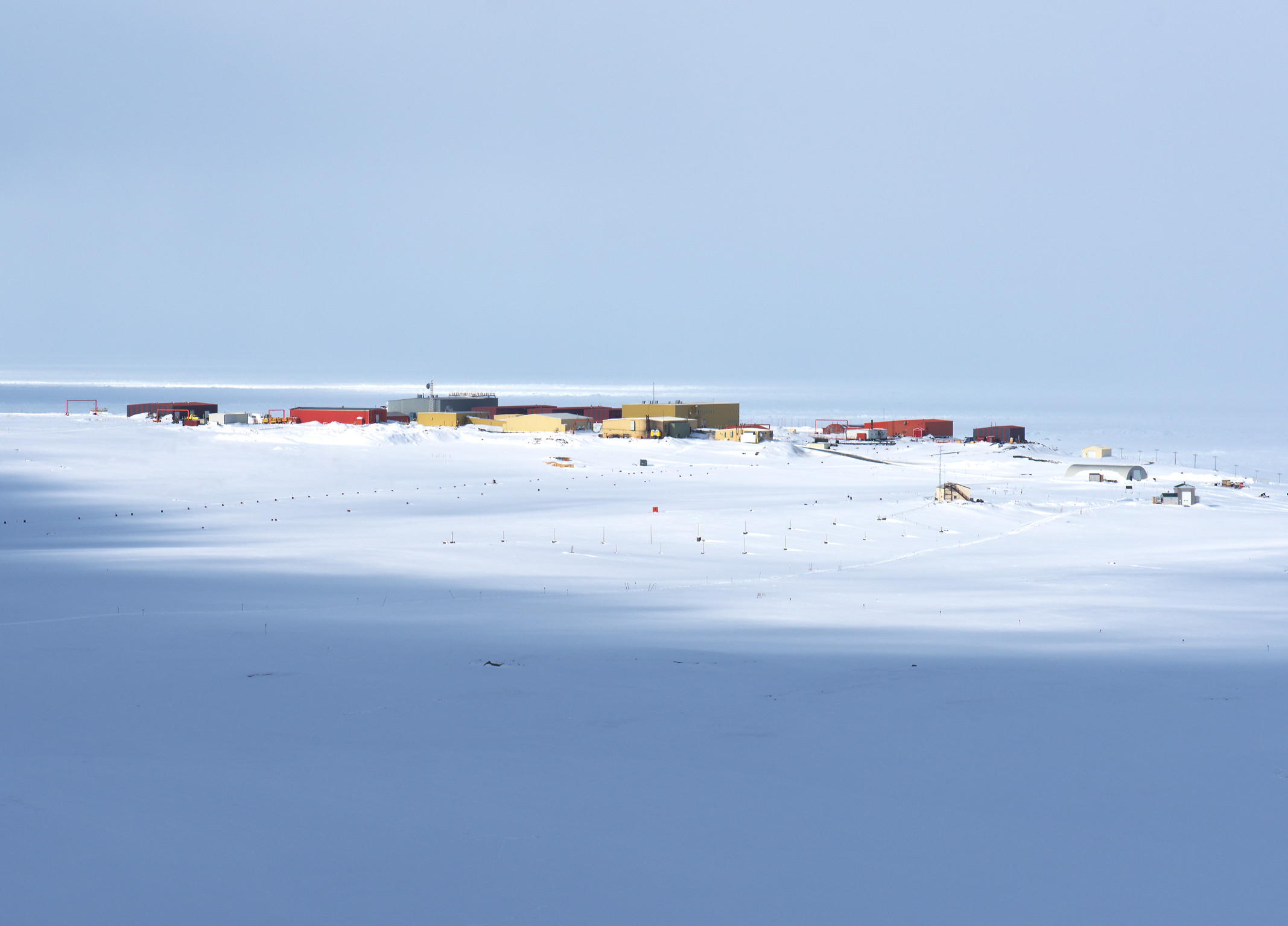
- The station from the south, May 2016
- Etymology: Named for HMS Alert
- Motto: Inuit Nunangata Ungata (English: Beyond the Inuit Land)
- Location within Nunavut
- Coordinates: 82°29′57″N 62°20′45″W
- Country: Canada
- Territory: Nunavut
- Region: Qikiqtaaluk
- Established: September 1, 1958
- Elevation: 30 m (100 ft)

Population (2021)
  - Total: 0
- Temporary population
- Time zone: UTC−05:00 (EST)
  - Summer (DST): UTC−04:00 (EDT)

Canadian Forces Station Alert (French: Station des Forces canadiennes Alert), often shortened to CFS Alert (SFC Alert), is a signals intelligence intercept facility of the Canadian Armed Forces at Alert, in the Qikiqtaaluk Region of Nunavut, Canada.

Located on the northeastern tip of Ellesmere Island, Alert is the northernmost continuously inhabited place in the world. It takes its name from the Royal Navy vessel HMS Alert, which wintered 10 km (6.2 mi) east of the present station off what is now Cape Sheridan, Nunavut in 1875–1876.

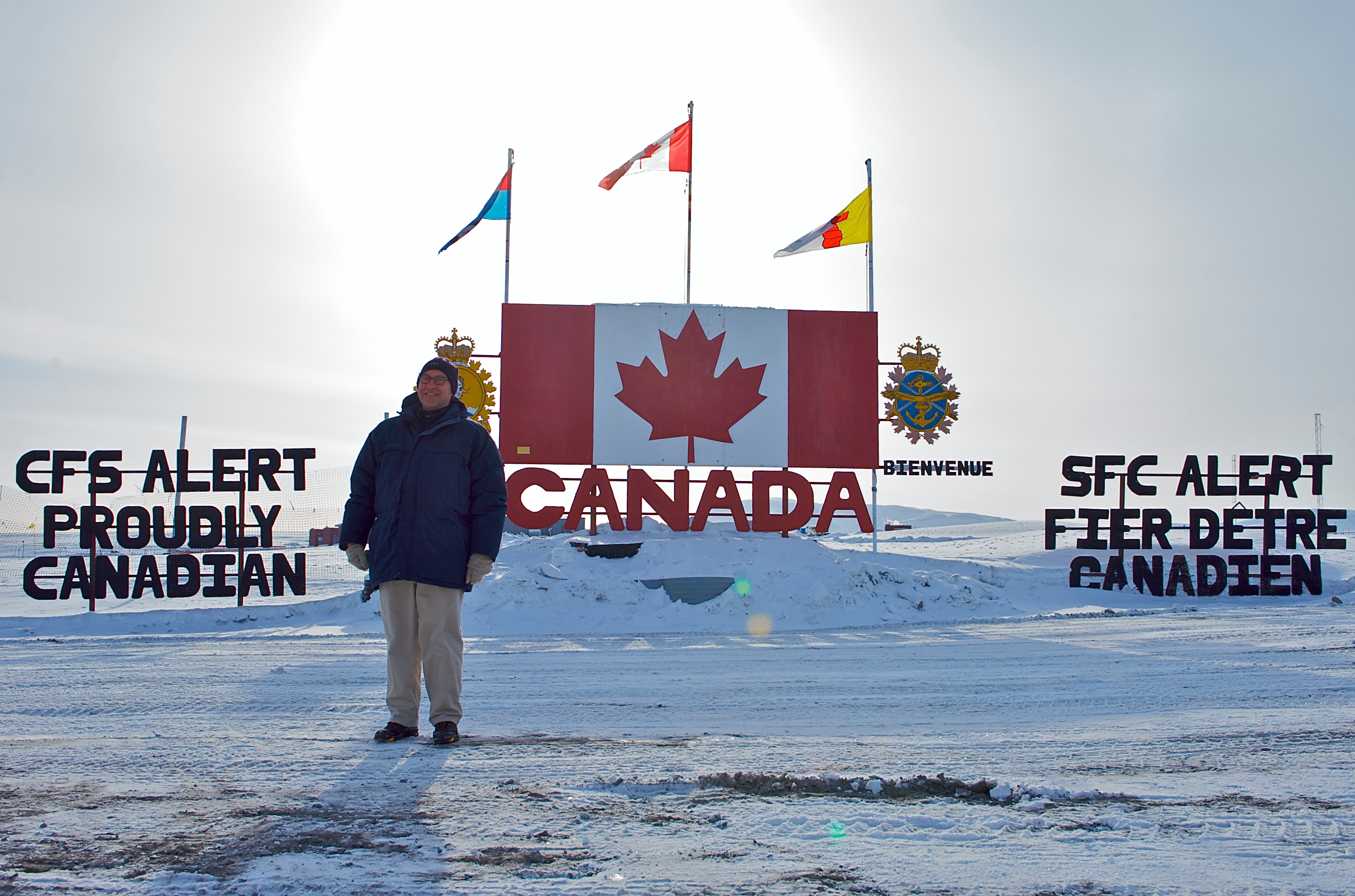
U.S. Ambassador David Jacobson in front of CFS Alert welcome sign

== History ==
=== Alert Wireless Station ===
Alert, then in Canada's Northwest Territories, was first settled April 9, 1950, when the first staff for the Joint Arctic Weather Station (JAWS) arrived and began construction. Since the beginning of the JAWS project, the Canadian military had been interested in the establishment at Alert for several reasons: the JAWS facility extended Canadian sovereignty over a large uninhabited area which Canada claimed as its sovereign territory, and furthermore, its proximity to the Soviet Union made it of strategic importance. Alert is closer to Moscow (c. 4,000 km [2,500 mi]) than it is to the capital Ottawa (c. 4,150 km [2,580 mi]). Thus, the possibility of using the site for intercepting radio signals was deemed to warrant a military presence.

In 1956, the Royal Canadian Air Force (RCAF), which was expanding its presence throughout the high Arctic with the construction of the Distant Early Warning Line radar network, established a building uphill from the Department of Transport's JAWS station to house "High Arctic Long Range Communications Research", or signals intelligence operations.

In 1957, Alert Wireless Station was conceived as an intercept facility to be jointly staffed by personnel from the Royal Canadian Navy (RCN) and the RCAF. Five additional buildings were constructed: a mess, three barracks, and a power house and vehicle maintenance building, in addition to the existing operations building, built in 1956. The operations building housed the radio intercept and cryptographic equipment. On 1 September 1958 control of the station was transferred from the RCAF to the Canadian Army and it officially began operations.

=== Canadian Forces Station Alert ===
The following decade saw a dramatic expansion of the station with a correspondingly greater number of personnel stationed there. The 1 February 1968 unification of the RCN, RCAF, and army to form the Canadian Armed Forces saw Alert Wireless Station change its name to Canadian Forces Station Alert (CFS Alert). Its personnel were no longer drawn from only the air force or navy, but primarily from the Canadian Forces Communications Command.

At its peak, CFS Alert had upwards of 215 personnel posted at any one time. The station became a key asset in the global ECHELON network of the US-UK-CAN-AUS-NZ intelligence sharing alliance, with Alert being privy to many secret Soviet communications regarding land-based and sea-based ICBM test launches and many operational military deployments.

The first military women to serve in Alert arrived in 1980 as part of the Canadian Forces' Women In Non-Traditional Roles study. After its completion in 1983, women were fully authorized to serve in all roles. The first female commanding officer was Major Cathy Cowan, who took command in January 1996. The first female Station Warrant Officer (SWO), Master Warrant Officer Renee Hansen, was appointed in December 2017.

Budget cuts to the Department of National Defence (DND) and Canadian Forces in 1994, and modernization of communications equipment, saw CFS Alert downsized to approximately 74 personnel by 1997–1998 when most radio-intercept operations were remotely controlled by personnel at CFS Leitrim. Remaining personnel are responsible for airfield operations, construction/engineering, food service, and logistical/administrative support. As of 2024, there are about 55 people stationed at CFS Alert, and they consist of military personnel, ECCC and other civilian employees. Only six persons are now responsible for actual operations, and control of the facility was passed to DND's Information Management Group following the disbanding of CF Communications Command with force restructuring and cutbacks in the mid-1990s. Several of these personnel are likely also attached to DND's Communications Security Establishment.

With Canada's commitment to the global war on terrorism following the September 11, 2001 terrorist attacks in New York City and Washington, D.C., CFS Alert has received renewed and increased funding to expand its SIGINT capabilities. On 1 April 2009, the RCAF officially took responsibility for CFS Alert from Canadian Forces Information Operations Group (CFIOG).

=== Civilian contractor ===
As of 13 April 2006 the Canadian Broadcasting Corporation reported that station heating costs had risen, leading the military to cut back on support trade positions by using private contractors. By 2008, maintenance operations on station (including food and housekeeping services, vehicle maintenance, power plant operation, and heating, electrical, and plumbing) had been transferred to a civilian contractor. The contract was initially awarded to Canadian Base Operators (CBO), a subsidiary of Black & McDonald. In 2012, the contract was won by Nasittuq Corporation, a majority Inuit-owned organization which also holds the North Warning System operations contract.

== Facilities and infrastructure ==
- Alert Airport
- Cold storage building
- Construction engineering building
- Fire station
- Headquarters and Personnel Services (HAPS) building: Churchill Hall
- Living quarters: Chimo Hall, Ladner Hall, and Whitehorse Hall
- Gym
- Operations building: Polaris Hall
- Power plants: primary and backup
- Supply building
- Vehicle maintenance building
- Water treatment plant

=== Main building ===
The main building consists of five halls; Churchill Hall contains the administrative and main amenities on the station, such as a gathering area called the "beach", a dining room called Igloo Gardens, library, barber shop, radio station, post office, and a store. Chimo, Ladner, and Whitehorse halls are the three barrack blocks, with each barrack block containing three sections. Polaris Hall contains the operations branch. All halls and barrack blocks are connected by a linkway. Because of the cold climate, the doors leading in and out of the main building are the same as those for walk-in refrigerators.

== See also ==
- Amundsen–Scott South Pole Station
- Drifting ice station (North Pole station)
- Nanisivik Naval Facility 1,100 km (680 mi) south
- Station Nord, Greenland
- Pituffik Space Base
- CFS Frobisher Bay
