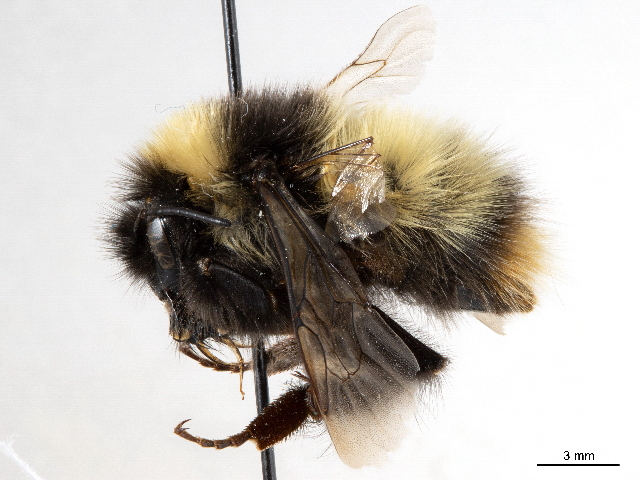
- Bombus neoboreus

Scientific classification
- Kingdom: Animalia
- Phylum: Arthropoda
- Class: Insecta
- Order: Hymenoptera
- Family: Apidae
- Genus: Bombus
- Subgenus: Alpinobombus

= Alpinobombus =

Subgenus of bees

Alpinobombus is a subgenus of bees within the bumblebee genus, Bombus. It is found from Northern Spain and Norway, east to the Himalayas and China.

== Species ==
There are nine currently recognized Alpinobombus species:

- Bombus alpinus – alpine bumblebee
- Bombus balteatus – golden-belted bumblebee
- Bombus hyperboreus – high Arctic bumblebee
- Bombus kirbiellus – high country (or golden-belted) bumblebee
- Bombus kluanensis – Kluane bumblebee
- Bombus natvigi – high Nearctic bumblebee
- Bombus neoboreus – active bumblebee
- Bombus polaris – polar bumblebee
- Bombus pyrrhopygus – Arctic bumblebee
