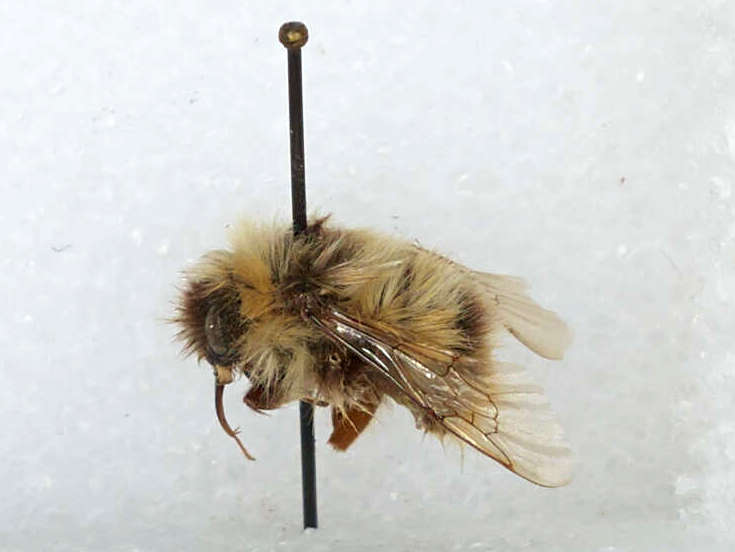

Conservation status
- Data Deficient (IUCN 3.1)

Scientific classification
- Kingdom: Animalia
- Phylum: Arthropoda
- Clade: Pancrustacea
- Class: Insecta
- Order: Hymenoptera
- Family: Apidae
- Genus: Bombus
- Subgenus: Alpinobombus
- Species: B. polaris

Binomial name
- Bombus polaris Curtis, 1835

= Bombus polaris =

Species of bee

Bombus polaris is a common Arctic bumblebee species. B. polaris is one of three bumblebees that live above the Arctic Circle. The others are its social parasites Bombus hyperboreus and Bombus natvigi. B. polaris is a social bee that can survive at near freezing temperatures. It has developed multiple adaptations to live in such cold temperatures. B. polaris has a thicker coat of hair than most bees, utilizes thermoregulation, and makes insulated nests.

== Taxonomy and phylogeny ==
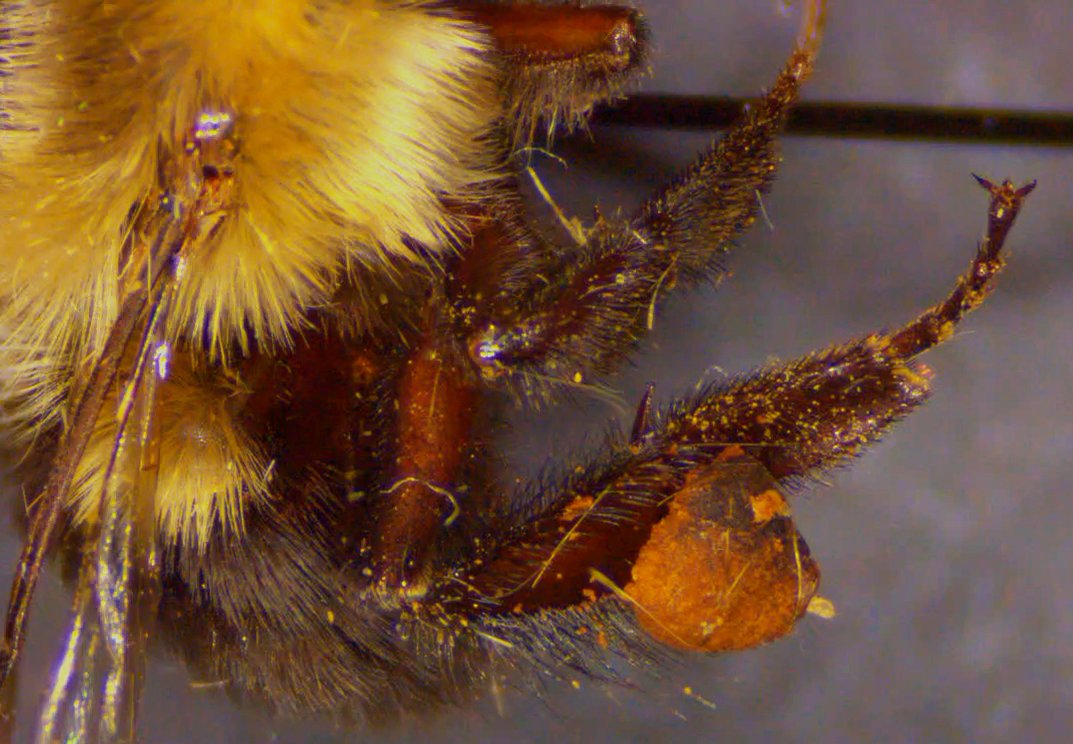
Bombus polaris with an orange pollen basket on hind leg

Bombus polaris is part of the family Apidae, which is part of the larger class of Insecta. Apidae is the largest family of bees, including several species of bees used by humans for honey consumption. B. polaris is part of the subgenus Alpinobombus along with Bombus alpinus, Bombus balteatus, Bombus hyperboreus, and Bombus neoboreus. Alpinobombus bees occur in arctic and high alpine regions. It is of the Bombini tribe, which feeds on pollen or nectar.

== Description and identification ==
=== General appearance ===
Bombus polaris has a thicker coat of hair than temperate bees in order to slow heat loss. Although the coloration of this bee is variable, the thorax is usually black with orange-yellow edges, while most of the abdomen is orange-yellow with a black tip. B. polaris also has a higher abdominal temperature than its temperate cousins.

=== Worker appearance ===
The color of the pubescence is noticeably variable. The pubescence of the apical dorsal abdominal segments varies from deep rust color to a dull yellow color. There is also a considerable variation in the size of the workers. Some can be scarcely 10 mm in length, while others can be much larger.

== Thermoregulation ==
B. polaris has a bio-mechanical method of bringing its body to a much higher abdominal temperature than its temperate relatives. The ability of B. polaris to fly in deep cold is due to a process called thermoregulation, which allows it to raise its internal body temperature up to 38 °C. For this reason B. polaris is likely to outcompete any temperate bumblebee species that might seek to expand to the northern range.

== Nests ==
The nests are heavily insulated, an important factor in the bees' energy conservation in the harsh polar environment. At the start of the colony cycle, the lone queen maintains a nest temperature of about 25-30 °C. However, when she makes foraging trips at frequent intervals, the temperature of the nest declines. At an air temperature of 10 °C, the nest temperature generally does not decrease lower than 7 °C in the half hour that the queen is foraging. After all of the 16 to 17 larvae of the first brood have developed into workers, the nest temperature is maintained at a steady 35 °C, and the comings and going of the queen and other foragers do not appear to affect it. The nest of Bombus polaris also appears to have a higher temperature than those of honeybees and bumblebees from temperate climates.

=== Structure ===
First, a fertilized queen must locate a suitable nesting site. After this, she builds a cell to store provisions, and then a hatch camera to house her offspring. B. polaris queens use a mixture of pollen and wax to build these initial structures. The hatch camera's construction is soon followed by that of a wax base. On top of this base, the queen deposits a clump of dust covered in flower nectar, subsequently ringed by a wax roller. She then lays her eggs into the clump and covers them with a dust mixture and a wax membrane.

== Distribution and habitat ==
This bumblebee has a wide circumpolar distribution, found in Canada, Arctic Alaska, Arctic islands (Devon Island, Ellesmere Island, Baffin Island and Greenland), northern Scandinavia and across Arctic Russia (Nenets, Yamalo-Nenets, Sakha and Chukotka). As of 2015, B. polaris is common and is not listed as endangered. Bombus polaris is an alpine species. They exclusively live at the summits of mountains. This clear separation between alpine species and subalpine species may be due to superior competition from the subalpine species, leading to a suboptimal habitat occupation of the alpine species. An alternative explanation is that the alpine bee species possess both the ability and body type to survive the colder temperatures, which naturally separates the two types of bees into distinct ecological territories. Alpine species usually have a larger body length in comparison to subalpine species.

== Colony cycle ==
=== Initiation ===
Young Bombus polaris queens hibernate for about nine months, suspended in an almost lifeless state in a mouse nest or some other burrow and waiting for the ground to warm. After this, B. polaris fertilized queens emerge from hibernation, visiting flowers and looking for areas to build potential nests. This signals the start of the seasonal cycle of development. Recently started colonies can be found in June or July.

=== Growth ===
B. polaris is a social bee that requires a completion of at least two generations every year. To make up for this short amount of time, the queens produce many workers per generation. The initial brood is a clutch of around 20 larvae that emerge in about ten days. Arctic bumblebee larvae grow fast, and will experience a near tropical environment due to the heat production of their queen, and later on, of the workers.

Arctic bumblebees have a larger initial brood as an adaptation to speed up the colony cycle in the very short growing season. Since the queen has time to produce only a few broods, she must also lay very large egg clutches. The life cycle is sped up by incubating the eggs internally that are already in the abdomen, thus increasing the rate of egg production and egg growth.

== Behavior ==
=== Foraging ===
Bombus polaris is one of the few bumblebee species where the queen will continue to forage while some workers have already emerged in the nest. She divides her time between incubating her brood and regulating the temperature of the nest to leaving the nest to forage. The food reserves gathered in the day are generally sufficient for only one night. When the bees exhaust their food, they enter torpor and cease to incubate. Occasional periods of semi-starvation lasting for a day or two do not harm the colony. The bees simply become drowsy and remain in a state of suspended animation.

== Life history and survivorship curves ==
The colony begins in the summer in June. The colony is only able to survive for two or three months until winter hits again. All workers, drones, and most females die with the colony.

The queen's first brood after the start of the colony will develop into worker bees – small sterile females who will enlarge the nest, forage, and tend to the next generation of bees. Worker bees will die along with the colony at the beginning of winter.

The young queen is the sole survivor of her colony after 9 months of hibernation during the winter. In the Arctic, only one queen per colony on average will survive the winter to renew the next life cycle. The colony only has one or two months to complete the social cycle of two generations. When winter returns, the queen dies with her progeny.

The queen's second brood in late summer include male drones and fertile females who are candidates for next year's queen. The drone's sole function is to fertilize the females, but most females will die along with the drones at the beginning of winter.

== Interaction with other species ==
=== Food ===
Large zygomorphic flowers of Pedicularis are dependent on B. polaris. B. polaris works the spikes of Pedicularis upwards from the bottom. Through this behavior, the adaption of gustatory organs to sugar is offset by the increasing concentration of sugars in the nectar up the spike. This behavior is also significantly related to pollination.

=== Predators ===
Predators of Bombus polaris include the buff-breasted sandpiper (Tryngites subruficollis), common eider (Somateria mollissima), and long-tailed duck (Clangula hyemalis), which will either eat the bees or feed them to their young.

=== Parasites ===
Bombus hyperboreus and Bombus natvigi (distinguished by the region they inhabit, being found in the Palearctic and Nearctic realms respectively) habitually take over the nests of Bombus polaris. Because of the short Arctic summer, B. polaris normally has time to produce only one brood of workers before the colony has to raise queens. When B. hyperboreus or B. natvigi take over the nest, all of their young are raised as queens by the B. polaris workers. Thus, B. hyperboreus and B. natvigi workers are not produced and pollen collectors are never seen.

=== Humans ===
Due to its cold tolerance the Bombus polaris appears to be one of the earliest pollinators of vegetation in the Arctic each year. Some plants they pollinate include Arctic poppies, Arctic roses, and Arctic willows. Their pollinator effect seems to be heaviest in the early spring, but decreases as the year continues. Samuel Robinson has found that, by the time most scientists arrive for the brief warm summers, the "Bumblebees (Bombus spp.) and Butterflies and Moths (Lepidoptera) were found to play a minor role in pollination, while flies (Dipterans) were shown to be the major pollinators." One of the leading modern experts on B. polaris, Bernd Heinrich, agrees with this finding, saying that when "it gets warm, there's a lot more fly pollination, and there's actually some pollination by mosquitoes, as well."
