= Ellesmere Island =

Island of the Arctic Archipelago in Nunavut, Canada

Native name: Umingmak Nuna
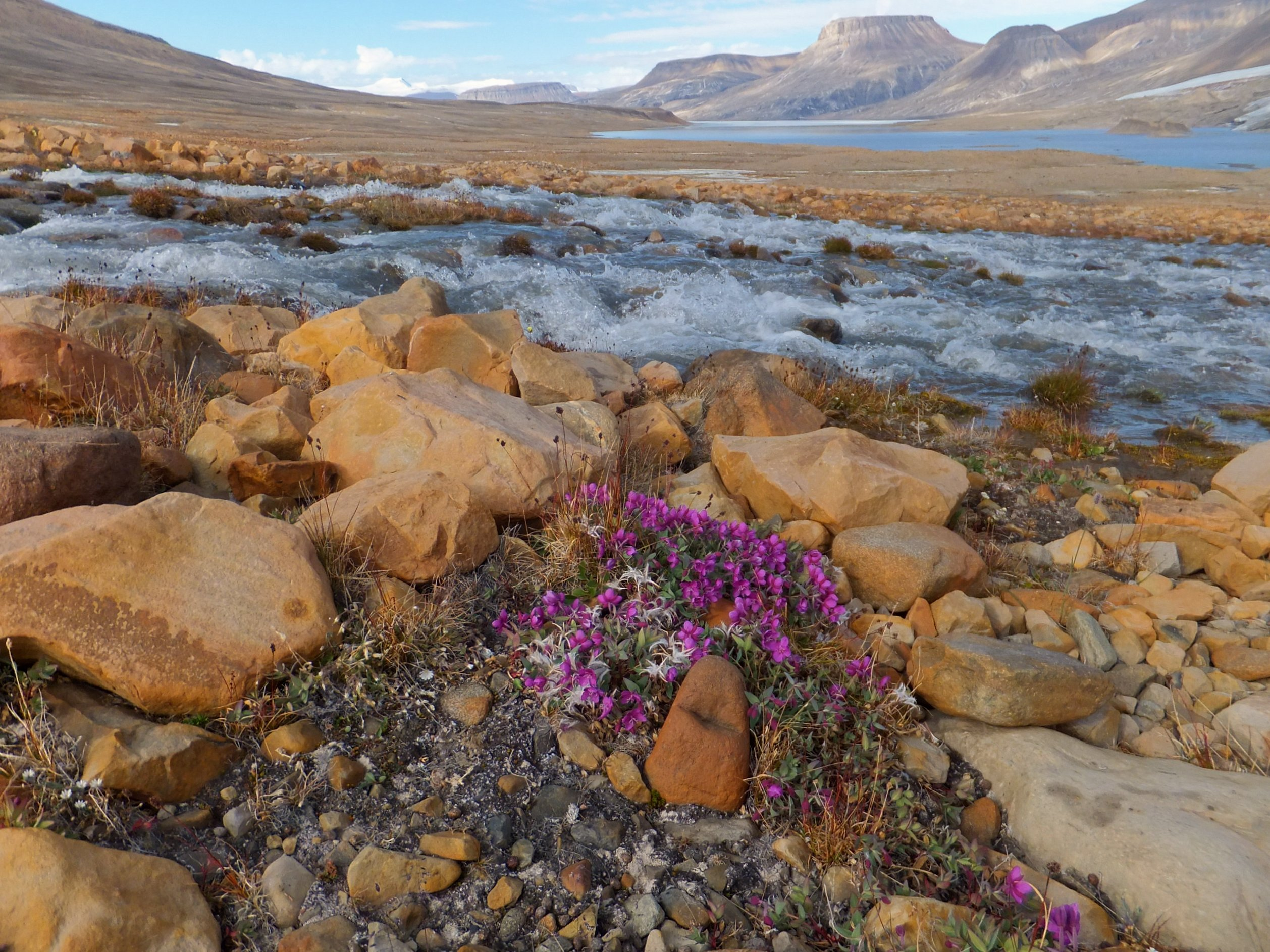
- Tundra in Quttinirpaaq National Park

- Location within Nunavut Location within Canada

Geography
- Location: Northern Canada
- Coordinates: 79°50′N 78°00′W
- Archipelago: Queen Elizabeth Islands
- Area: 197,790.33 km^{2} (76,367.27 sq mi) (2026)
- Area rank: 3rd in Canada & 10th worldwide
- Length: 830 km (516 mi)
- Width: 645 km (400.8 mi)
- Highest elevation: 2,616 m (8583 ft)
- Highest point: Barbeau Peak

Administration
- Canada
- Territory: Nunavut
- Largest settlement: Grise Fiord (pop. 144)

Demographics
- Population: 144 (2021)
- Pop. density: 0.00073/km^{2} (0.00189/sq mi)

Additional information
- Area code: 867

Ellesmere Island (Note: Inuktitut: ᐅᒥᖕᒪᒃ ᓄᓇ, romanized: Umingmak Nuna, lit. 'land of muskoxen'; French: île d'Ellesmere)) is Canada's northernmost and third largest island, and the tenth largest in the world. It comprises an area of 197,790.33 km^{2} (76,367.27 sq mi), slightly smaller than Great Britain, and the total length of the island is 830 km (520 mi). Lying within the Arctic Archipelago, Ellesmere Island is considered part of the Queen Elizabeth Islands. At 83°06′41″N 69°57′13″W is Cape Columbia, the northernmost point of land in Canada and one of the most northern points of land on Earth (the undisputed northernmost point of land on Earth is the nearby Kaffeklubben Island of Greenland). As of 2025, the north geomagnetic pole (the south pole of the earth's magnetic field) is located on the island at 80°51′N 72°46′W. The Arctic Cordillera mountain system covers much of Ellesmere Island, making it the most mountainous in the Arctic Archipelago. More than one-fifth of the island is protected as Quttinirpaaq National Park. In 2021, the population of Ellesmere Island was recorded at 144 in three settlements: Alert, Eureka, and Grise Fiord. Ellesmere Island is administered as part of the Qikiqtaaluk Region in the Canadian territory of Nunavut.

== Geology ==
Ellesmere Island has three major geological regions. The Grant Land Highlands is a large belt of fold mountains which dominate the northern face of the island. It is part of the Franklinian mobile belt, a zone of volcanic and intrusive rock from the Cretaceous. South of this is the Greely-Hazen Plateau, a large tableland composed of sedimentary and volcanic rocks. Covering most of the island, the coastal sedimentary plateau is a succession of highly eroded sedimentary peaks which are part of the Franklinian Shield with an extension of the Canadian Shield (Igneous and metamorphic rocks from the Precambrian) in the island's southeastern corner. In addition, there are syntectonic clastics which comprise the Ellesmere Island Volcanics of the Sverdrup Basin Magmatic Province. A period of uplift and faulting prior to the Pleistocene epoch (>2.6 Ma) established the overall features of the island. Additional uplift occurred due to isostatic rebound following the Last Glacial Period. Land features were then shaped by erosion from glacial ice, meltwaters, and scouring by sea ice.

== History ==
It is believed that each of the pre-contact peoples who migrated through the High Arctic approached Ellesmere Island from the south and west. They were able to travel along Ellesmere's coasts or overland to Nares Strait, and some of them crossed the strait to populate Greenland. The archaeological record of past Arctic settlements and cultures here from up to several thousands of years ago is rather well intact, as artifacts deteriorate very slowly in the polar conditions. Items exposed to the cold, dry winds become naturally freeze-dried, while items that become buried are preserved in the permafrost. From these sites and artifacts, archaeologists have been able to construct a history of these cultures. However, the research is still incomplete, and only a small proportion of the details of excavations have been published.

=== Small tool cultures ===
The Arctic Small Tool tradition peoples (a.k.a. Paleo-Eskimos) in the High Arctic had small populations organized as hunting bands, spread from Axel Heiberg Island to the northern extremity of Greenland, where the Independence I culture was active from 2700 BCE. On Ellesmere, they chiefly hunted in the Eureka Upland and the Hazen Plateau. Six different small-tool cultures have been identified at the Smith Sound region: Independence I, Independence I / Saqqaq, Pre-Dorset, Saqqaq, early Dorset, and late Dorset. They chiefly hunted muskoxen: more than three-quarters of their known archaeological sites on Ellesmere are located in the island's interior and their winter dwellings were skin tents, suggesting a need for mobility to follow the herds. There is evidence at Lake Hazen of a trade network c. 1500–1000 BCE, including soapstone lamps (qulliq) from Greenland and incised lance heads from peoples to the south.

=== Thule culture ===
Decline of the Dorset culture (brown) and expansion of the Thule (green), c. 900–1500

The Thule moved into the High Arctic at the time of a warming trend, c. 1000 CE. Their major population centre was the Smith Sound area (on both the Ellesmere and Greenland sides) due to its proximity to polynyas and its position on transportation routes. From settlements at Smith Sound, the Thule sent summer hunting parties to harvest marine mammals in Nansen Strait. Their summer camps are evidenced by tent rings as far north as Archer Fiord, with clusters of stone dwellings around Lady Franklin Bay and at Lake Hazen which suggest semi-permanent occupations. The Thule genetically and culturally completely replaced the Dorset some time after 1300 CE. The Thule displaced the small-tool cultures, having a number of technological advantages which notably included effective weapons, kayaks and umiaks for hunting marine mammals, and sled dogs for surface transport and pursuit. The Thule also had an extensive trade network, evidenced by meteoritic iron from Greenland which was exported through Ellesmere Island to the rest of the archipelago and to the North American mainland. More than fifty Norse artifacts have been found in Thule archaeological sites on the Bache Peninsula, including pieces of chain mail. It is uncertain if Ellesmere Island was directly visited by Norse Greenlanders who sailed from the south or if the items were traded through a network of middlemen. It is also possible the items may have been taken from a shipwreck. A bronze set of scales discovered in western Ellesmere Island has been interpreted as indicating the presence of a Norse trader in the region. The Norse artifacts date from c. 1250 to 1400 CE. Between 1400 and 1600 CE, the Little Ice Age developed and conditions for hunting became increasingly difficult, forcing the Thule to withdraw from Ellesmere and the other northern islands of the archipelago. The Thule who remained in northern Greenland became isolated, specialized at hunting a diminishing number of game animals, and lost the ability to make boats. Thus, the waters around Ellesmere were not navigated again until the arrival of large European vessels in the 1800s.

=== Early European exploration ===
Much of the initial phase of European exploration of the North American Arctic was centred on a search for the Northwest Passage and undertaken by Britain. The 1616 expedition of William Baffin was the first group of Europeans to record sighting the then-unnamed Ellesmere Island (Baffin named Jones and Smith Sounds on the island's south and southeast coasts). However, the onset of the Little Ice Age interrupted the progress of explorations for two centuries. In 1818, an ice jam in Baffin Bay broke, allowing European vessels access to the High Arctic (whalers had been active in Davis Strait, about 1,000 km [620 mi] southeast of Ellesmere, since 1719). Baffin Bay was then navigable in the summers due to the presence of an ice dam in Smith Sound, which prevented Arctic drift ice from flowing south. The other channels of the archipelago remained congested with ice. That year, John Ross led the first recorded European expedition to Cape York, at which time there were reportedly only 140 Inughuit. (The Inughuit of North Greenland, the Kalaallit of West Greenland, and Inuit of the archipelago are descendants of the Thule culture, which had diverged during the isolation imposed by the Little Ice Age.) Knowledge of Ellesmere persisted in the oral histories of the Inuit of Baffin Island and the Inughuit of northern Greenland, who each called it Umingmak Nuna (Inuktitut for 'land of muskoxen').

=== Euro-American exploration and contact ===
The search for Franklin's lost expedition – also searching for the Northwest Passage and to establish claims to the Far North – involved more than 40 expeditions to the High Arctic over two decades, and represented the peak period of Euro-American Arctic exploration. Edward Augustus Inglefield led an 1852 expedition which surveyed the coastlines of Baffin Bay and Smith Sound, being stopped by ice in Nares Strait. He named Ellesmere Island for the president of the Royal Geographical Society (1849–1852), Francis Egerton, 1st Earl of Ellesmere. The Second Grinnell expedition (1853–1855) made slightly further progress before becoming trapped in the ice. Over two winters the expedition charted both sides of Kane Basin to about 80°N, from where Elisha Kent Kane claimed to have sighted the conjectured Open Polar Sea. During this period, as the Little Ice Age abated and the hunting of marine mammals became more feasible again, Indigenous peoples began to return to Ellesmere Island. The most well-known of these migrations in both Inuit and European accounts is the journey of Qitlaq, who led a group of Inuit families from Baffin Island to northwestern Greenland, via Ellesmere Island, in the 1850s. (Note: Qitlaq reportedly met members of Inglefield's 1854 expedition and Sir Leopold McClintock's 1857–1859 expedition while on Devon Island) This journey reestablished contact between Inuit who had been separated for two centuries and reintroduced vital technologies to the Inughuit. Other groups followed and by the 1870s Inuit were living on Ellesmere Island and had regular contact with those on the neighbouring islands. Contact between Inuit and Europeans or Americans was often indirect, as the Inuit happened upon shipwrecks or abandoned base camps which provided wood and metal resources. European goods were also obtained through inter-group trade. Long-term contact began in the 1800s through whaling stations and trading posts, which frequently relocated. Euro-American expeditions employed Inughuit, Inuit and west Greenlander guides, hunters and labourers, gradually blending their knowledge with European technology to conduct effective exploration.

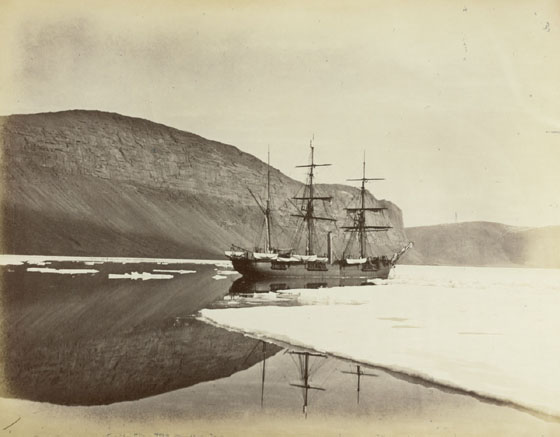
HMS Alert off Cape Prescott in 1875

British and United States Arctic expeditions had been interrupted for some years due to the priorities of the Crimean War and the American Civil War, respectively. By about 1860, the focus of Arctic exploration had shifted to the North Pole. As earlier attempts at the pole via Svalbard or eastern Greenland had reached impasses, numerous expeditions came to Ellesmere Island to pursue the route through Nares Straight.

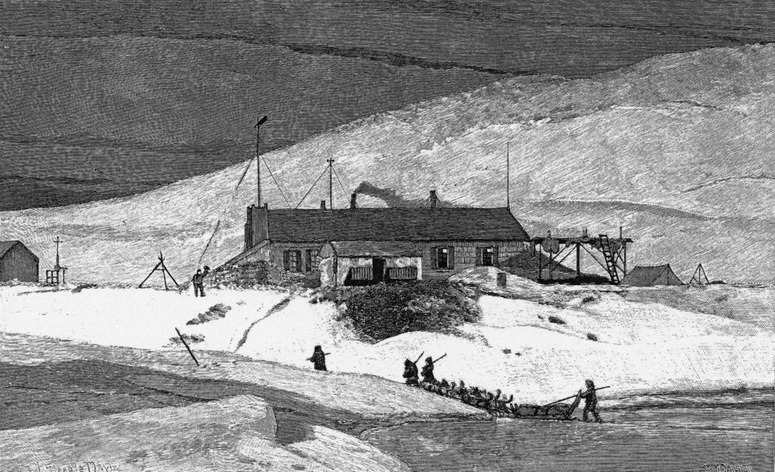
Fort Conger in Grinnel Land, May 1883

The Lady Franklin Bay Expedition, a United States expedition, led by Adolphus Greely in 1881 crossed the island from east to west, establishing Fort Conger in the northern part of the island. The Greely expedition found fossil forests on Ellesmere Island in the late 1880s. Stenkul Fiord was first explored in 1902 by Per Schei, a member of Otto Sverdrup's 2nd Norwegian Polar Expedition. The Ellesmere Ice Shelf was documented by the British Arctic Expedition of 1875–76, in which Lieutenant Pelham Aldrich's party went from Cape Sheridan (82°28′N 61°30′W) west to Cape Alert (82°16′N 85°33′W), including the Ward Hunt Ice Shelf. In 1906 Robert Peary led an expedition in northern Ellesmere Island, from Cape Sheridan along the coast to the western side of Nansen Sound (93°W). During Peary's expedition, the ice shelf was continuous; it has since been estimated to have covered 8,900 km^{2} (3,400 sq mi). The ice shelf broke apart in the 20th century, presumably due to climate change.

=== Establishment of Canadian sovereignty ===
In 1880, the British Arctic Territories were transferred to Canada. Canada did little to solidify its legal possession of the islands until prompted by foreign action in 1902–03: Otto Sverdrup claimed the Sverdrup Islands, three islands west of Ellesmere, for Norway, the Alaska boundary dispute was settled against Canada's interests, and Roald Amundsen set out to sail the Northwest Passage. To establish an official government presence in the Far North, the North-West Mounted Police (NWMP) were sent on sovereignty patrols. A NWMP detachment sailed to the Arctic whaling stations in 1903, where they forbade whalers from killing muskox or trading skins, in order to prevent over-hunting and protect the ability of Inuit to sustain themselves. In 1904 a NWMP detachment sailed to Cape Herschel at the east end of Sverdrup Pass, where they could intercept hunters accessing the interior of Ellesmere.

While the fur trade was brought under control, American exploration parties to the Far North had acted with autonomy and intensively hunted terrestrial mammals to sustain their expeditions. Peary's parties had heavily hunted muskoxen on Ellesmere and had nearly brought the extinction of caribou in northern Greenland; the Crocker Land Expedition (1913–1916) also extensively hunted muskoxen. In response to these and other trespasses, the government amended the Northwest Game Act to prohibit the killing of muskoxen except for Native inhabitants who otherwise faced starvation.

In 1920, the government learned that Inughuit from Greenland had been annually visiting Ellesmere Island for polar bear and muskox hunting – in violation of Canadian law – and selling the skins at Knud Rasmussen's trading post (known as Thule station) at North Star Bay. The Danish government stated that North Greenland was a "no man's land" outside their administration and Rasmussen, as the de facto sole authority, refused to stop the trade, which the Inughuit needed to support themselves. In response, Royal Canadian Mounted Police (RCMP) detachments were established on Ellesmere Island at Craig Harbour in 1922 and at Bache Post in 1926, positioned to guard the coastal and overland routes to the hunting grounds on the western side of Ellesmere. In addition to intercepting illegal hunting and fur-trading, the RCMP conducted patrols and encouraged the Inuit to maintain their traditional lifestyle. These posts were closed in the mid-1930s, after the sovereignty issues had been settled.

== Geography ==
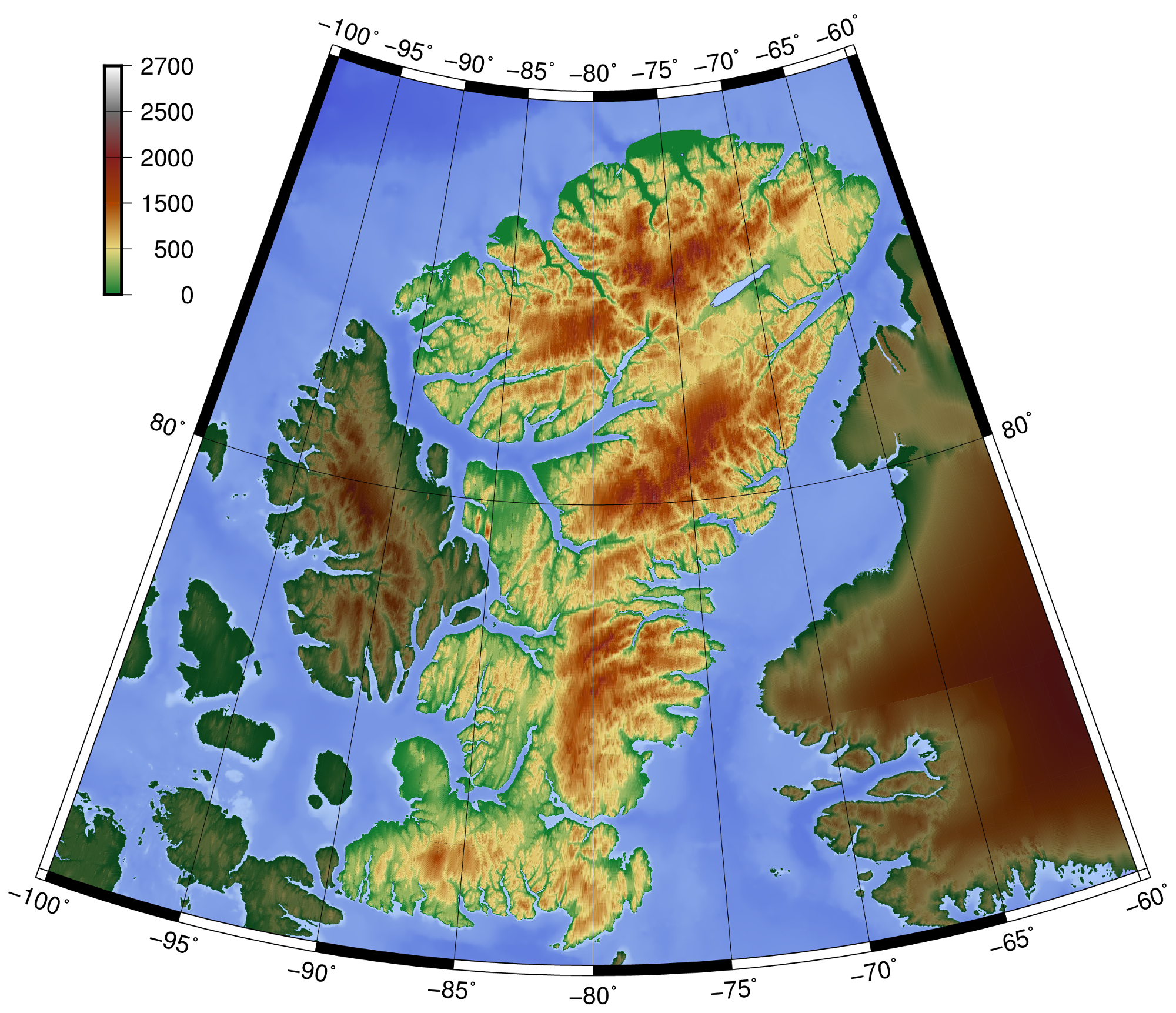
Topography of Ellesmere Island

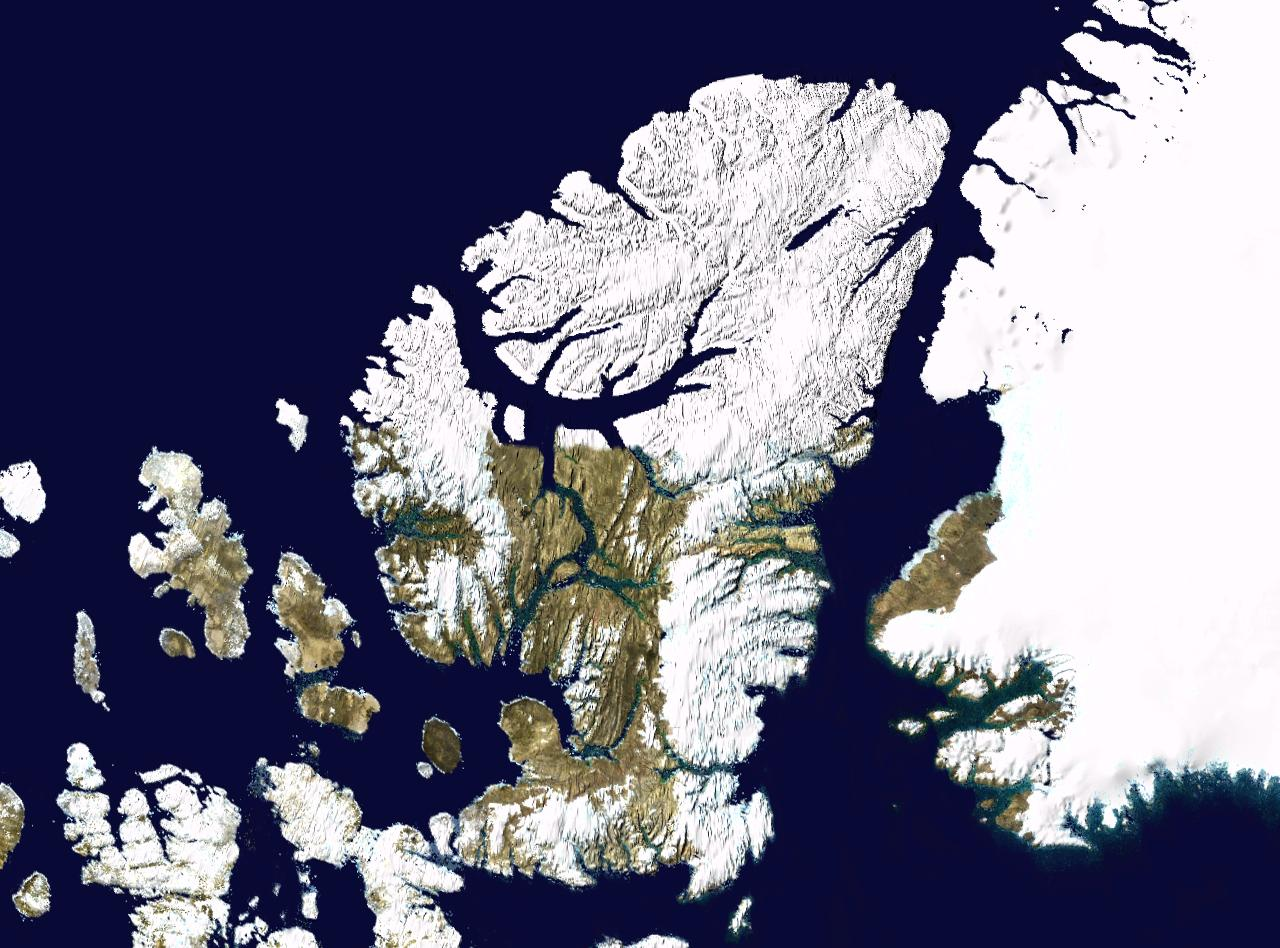
Satellite image montage showing Ellesmere Island and its neighbours

Ellesmere Island is the northernmost island of the Arctic Archipelago in Canada's Far North and one of the world's northernmost land masses. It is exceeded in this regard only by neighbouring Greenland, which extends about 60 km (37 mi) closer to the north pole. Ellesmere's northernmost point, Cape Columbia (at 83°06′41″N 69°57′13″W), is less than 800 km (500 mi) from the north pole, while its southern coasts at 77°N are well within the Arctic Circle. Ellesmere has the highest and longest mountain ranges in eastern North America and is the most mountainous island in the Arctic Archipelago. It has over half of the archipelago's ice cover, with ice caps and glaciers across 40% of its surface. Its extensive coastline includes some of the world's longest fiords. To the west, Ellesmere is separated from Axel Heiberg Island by Nansen and Eureka Sounds, the latter of which narrows to 13 km (8.1 mi). Devon Island is to the south across Jones Sound; at the west end of the sound, they are separated by North Kent Island and two channels which narrow to 4 and 10 km (2.5 and 6.2 mi). Greenland is to the east across Nares Strait; the strait narrows to 46 km (29 mi) at Cape Isabella on Smith Sound and further north narrows to 19 km (12 mi) at Robeson Channel. These channels and straits typically freeze over in winter, though winds and currents leave pockets of open water (temporary leads and persistent polynyas) in Nares Strait. To the north of Ellesmere is the Arctic Ocean, with Lincoln Sea to the northeast.

=== Protected areas ===
More than one-fifth of the island is protected as Quttinirpaaq National Park (formerly Ellesmere Island National Park Reserve), which includes seven fjords and a variety of glaciers, as well as Lake Hazen, North America's largest lake north of the Arctic Circle. The highest mountain in Nunavut, Barbeau Peak (2,616 metres [8,583 ft]), is located in the British Empire Range on Ellesmere Island. The most northern mountain range in the world, the Challenger Mountains, is located in the northeast region of the island. The northern lobe of the island is called Grant Land.

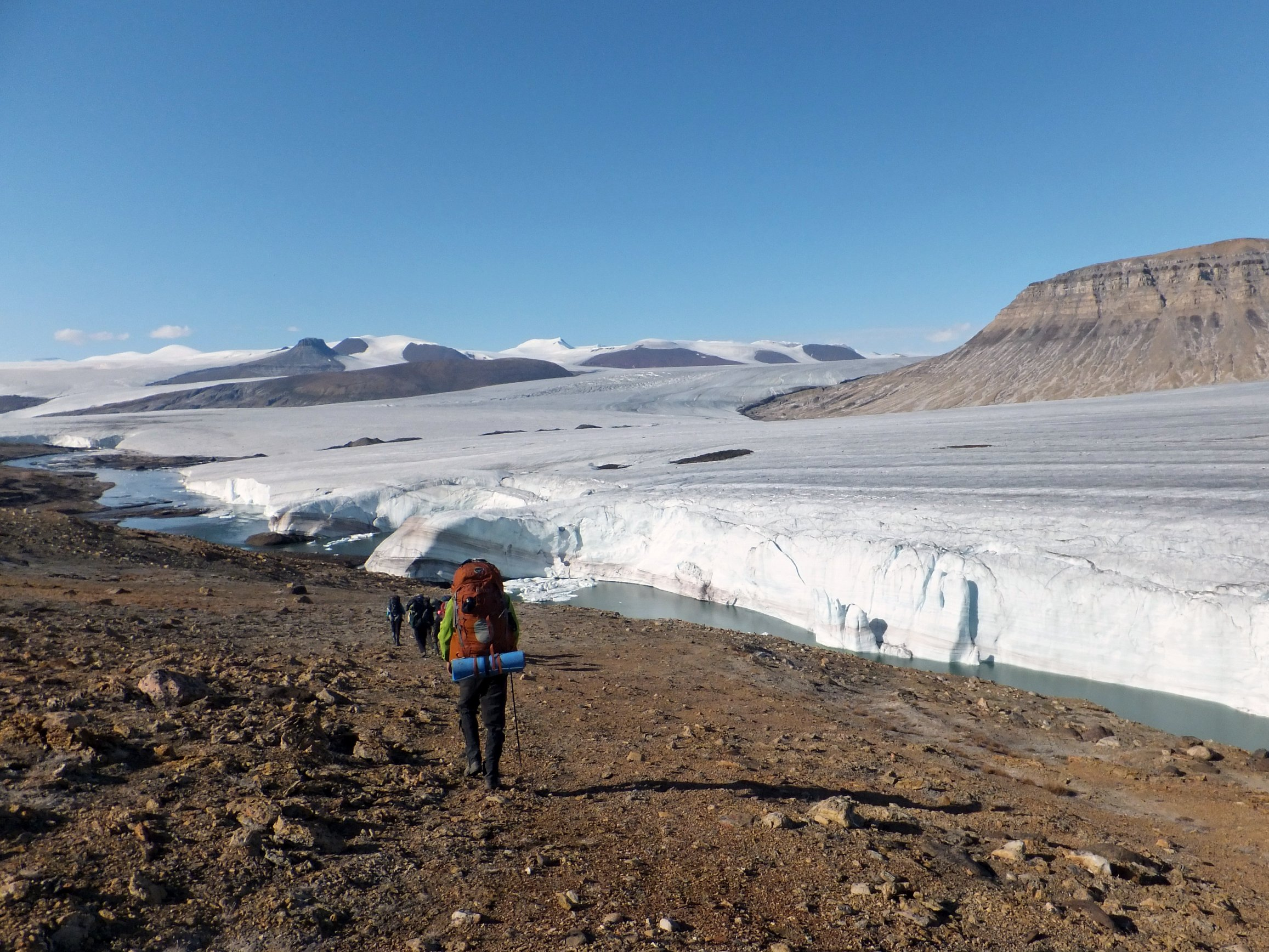
Air Force glacier in Quttinirpaaq National Park

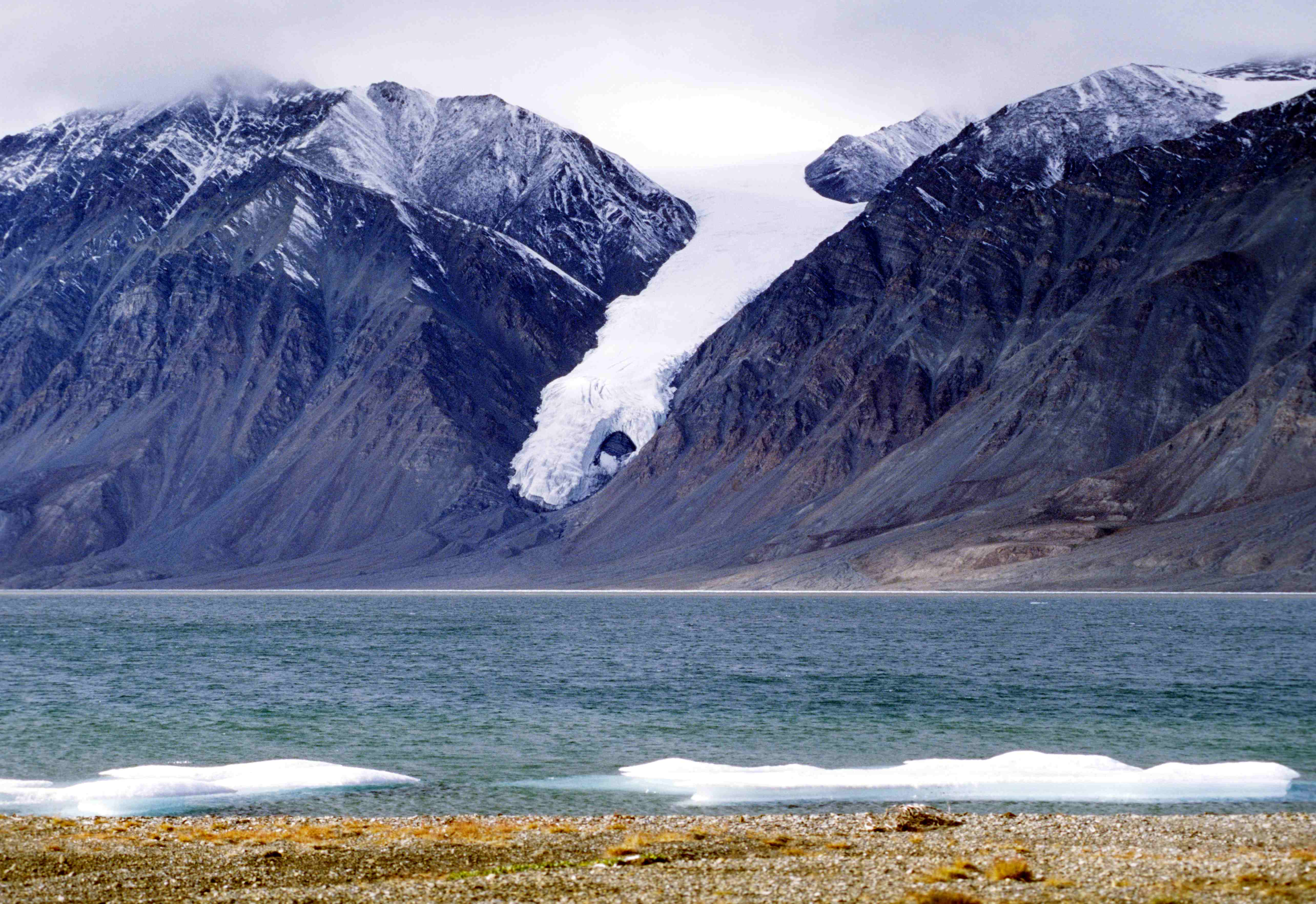
Gull Glacier in Tanquary Fiord

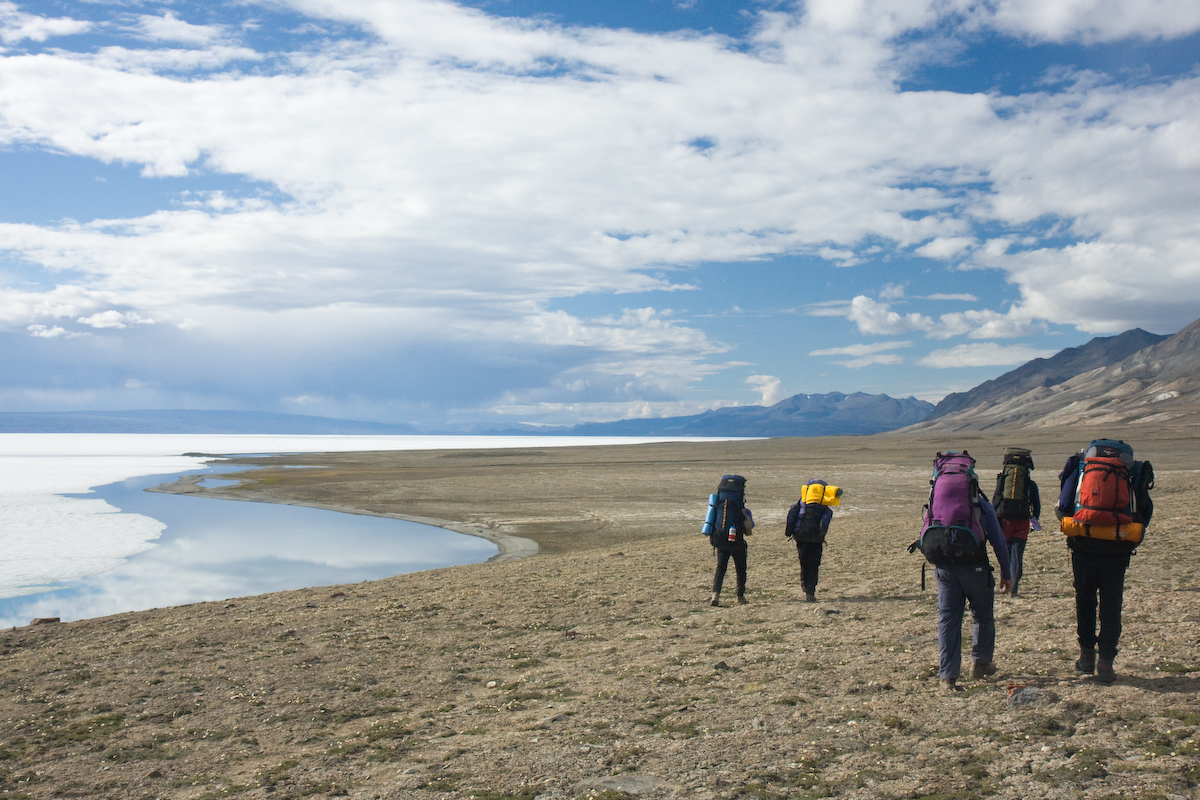
Hiking on Ellesmere Island

The Arctic willow is the only woody species to grow on Ellesmere Island. In July 2007, a study noted the disappearance of habitat for waterfowl, invertebrates, and algae on Ellesmere Island. According to John Smol of Queen's University in Kingston, Ontario, and Marianne S. V. Douglas of the University of Alberta in Edmonton, warming conditions and evaporation have caused low water levels and changes in the chemistry of ponds and wetlands in the area. The researchers noted that "In the 1980s they often needed to wear hip waders to make their way to the ponds...while by 2006 the same areas were dry enough to burn."

=== Climate ===
Ellesmere Island has a tundra climate (Köppen ET) and an ice cap climate (Köppen EF), with temperatures being cold year-round, usually below freezing. Two semi-permanent air systems dominate the weather: the high-pressure northern polar vortex and a low-pressure area which forms in different sites between Baffin Bay and the Labrador Sea. Prevailing winds on Ellesmere are northwesterly, cold, and of low humidity due to ice cover over the Arctic Ocean. Seasonal shifts on Ellesmere are sudden and striking: winters are long and harsh, summers short and relatively abundant, with spring and autumn being brief intervals of transition. Fog regularly occurs near open water in September. While the major air systems strengthen towards their annual peak in winter, the Arctic and Atlantic air masses collide in autumn to produce severe storms at Ellesmere. The storm season peaks in October and persists until the sea freezes. The polar vortex strengthens during the polar night and gives rise to easterly winds which are major hazards for populations, especially given the very low temperatures. January winds have been recorded at 104 kilometres per hour (65 mph) with gusts to 130–145 km/h (81–90 mph) at Fort Conger and 65–80 km/h (40–50 mph) at Lake Hazen. Very cold temperatures continue until April and no month passes without experiencing freezing temperatures. Snowfall begins in late August and does not melt until the June thaw. The seasonal shift in daylight is also extreme. The polar night lasts from four-and-a-half months in the north to about three months in the south, with a similar period of midnight sun.

==== Regional variation ====
Ellesmere's Arctic marine climate is strongly affected in the north by Arctic Ocean currents and the polar vortex, while the climate of the southeastern coast is influenced by the warm Atlantic water of the West Greenland Current. Interior regions shielded by the island's high mountain ranges experience distinctive quasi-continental microclimates. The highest precipitation is on the northern coast, averaging 80 to 100 millimetres (3.1 to 3.9 in). On the south side of the Grant Land mountains, only 20 mm (0.79 in) reaches the Hazen Plateau. The average number of snow-free days varies from 45 days on the north coast to 77 days in the Eureka–Tanquary corridor. Winters are considerably colder in the interior. At Lake Hazen, Peary's expedition recorded daytime temperatures of −53 °C (−64 °F) in February 1900, and a Defence Research Board party recorded temperatures as low as −56.2 °C (−69.2 °F) in the winter of 1957–58. (Note: While Dick 2001 gives this temperature as −70 °C (−94 °F), this is the only temperature the source provides in Celsius on that and the adjacent pages and appears to be a typo. Other sources for this International Geophysical Year observation station give the temperature as −69.2 °F (−56.2 °C), noting that this stands as the coldest temperature reported in the Arctic Archipelago.) Nonetheless, there are archaeological remains of winter dwellings of both Independence and Thule cultures in the interior.

Climate data for Grise Fiord (Grise Fiord Airport) WMO ID: 71971; coordinates 76°25′22″N 82°54′08″W; elevation: 44.5 m (146 ft); 1991–2020 normals, extremes 1984–present
Month	Jan	Feb	Mar	Apr	May	Jun	Jul	Aug	Sep	Oct	Nov	Dec	Year
Record high humidex	−1.3	−5.0	2.3	−2.4	8.4	14.2	15.0	14.4	6.9	5.9	2.4	−1.8	15.0
Record high °C (°F)	4.4 (39.9)	−0.5 (31.1)	2.7 (36.9)	3.0 (37.4)	12.5 (54.5)	14.4 (57.9)	15.6 (60.1)	14.8 (58.6)	8.5 (47.3)	7.5 (45.5)	3.0 (37.4)	0.5 (32.9)	15.6 (60.1)
Mean daily maximum °C (°F)	−27.1 (−16.8)	−27.7 (−17.9)	−25.0 (−13.0)	−15.8 (3.6)	−4.0 (24.8)	4.0 (39.2)	6.8 (44.2)	5.6 (42.1)	0.1 (32.2)	−7.5 (18.5)	−15.9 (3.4)	−21.4 (−6.5)	−10.7 (12.7)
Daily mean °C (°F)	−30.6 (−23.1)	−31.8 (−25.2)	−29.3 (−20.7)	−21.0 (−5.8)	−8.4 (16.9)	1.1 (34.0)	—	—	−1.9 (28.6)	−10.0 (14.0)	−19.3 (−2.7)	−25.0 (−13.0)	—
Mean daily minimum °C (°F)	−31.7 (−25.1)	−33.7 (−28.7)	−32.1 (−25.8)	−24.3 (−11.7)	−11.1 (12.0)	−1.5 (29.3)	1.1 (34.0)	0.7 (33.3)	−3.6 (25.5)	−11.4 (11.5)	−20.2 (−4.4)	−27.0 (−16.6)	−16.3 (2.7)
Record low °C (°F)	−45.0 (−49.0)	−47.0 (−52.6)	−46.0 (−50.8)	−40.5 (−40.9)	−30.5 (−22.9)	−13.0 (8.6)	−3.5 (25.7)	−7.4 (18.7)	−16.0 (3.2)	−29.0 (−20.2)	−41.1 (−42.0)	−42.0 (−43.6)	−47.0 (−52.6)
Record low wind chill	−53.3	−51.8	−54.5	−44.9	−31.3	−12.3	−4.9	−12.6	−20.0	−33.2	−48.0	−45.6	−54.5
Average precipitation mm (inches)	7.9 (0.31)	6.0 (0.24)	13.5 (0.53)	12.1 (0.48)	9.4 (0.37)	13.8 (0.54)	35.0 (1.38)	28.0 (1.10)	15.4 (0.61)	18.6 (0.73)	14.8 (0.58)	8.8 (0.35)	183.2 (7.21)
Average rainfall mm (inches)	0.0 (0.0)	0.0 (0.0)	0.0 (0.0)	0.0 (0.0)	0.2 (0.01)	10.2 (0.40)	31.8 (1.25)	21.3 (0.84)	5.1 (0.20)	0.1 (0.00)	0.0 (0.0)	0.0 (0.0)	68.7 (2.70)
Average snowfall cm (inches)	6.8 (2.7)	5.7 (2.2)	11.1 (4.4)	10.4 (4.1)	9.6 (3.8)	4.7 (1.9)	1.6 (0.6)	11.2 (4.4)	14.3 (5.6)	—	14.8 (5.8)	—	—
Average precipitation days (≥ 0.2 mm)	7.2	6.6	9.3	9.0	7.6	6.0	8.9	8.6	7.4	9.6	8.00	8.0	96.0
Average rainy days (≥ 0.2 mm)	0.0	0.0	0.0	0.0	0.12	3.7	7.2	7.2	1.4	0.13	0.0	0.0	19.8
Average snowy days (≥ 0.2 cm)	5.5	4.7	6.1	5.2	5.6	1.6	0.47	2.2	5.1	—	6.6	—	—
Source: Environment and Climate Change Canada

Climate data for Eureka (Eureka Aerodrome) WMO ID: 71917; coordinates 79°59′N 85°56′W; elevation: 10.4 m (34 ft); 1991–2020 normals, extremes 1947–present
Month	Jan	Feb	Mar	Apr	May	Jun	Jul	Aug	Sep	Oct	Nov	Dec	Year
Record high humidex	−1.1	−1.1	−8.5	−3.0	7.3	17.9	20.8	17.4	7.2	4.8	−3.9	−4.0	20.8
Record high °C (°F)	−1.1 (30.0)	−1.1 (30.0)	−8.0 (17.6)	−2.8 (27.0)	7.5 (45.5)	18.5 (65.3)	20.9 (69.6)	17.6 (63.7)	9.3 (48.7)	5.0 (41.0)	−1.7 (28.9)	−2.1 (28.2)	20.9 (69.6)
Mean daily maximum °C (°F)	−32.3 (−26.1)	−33.0 (−27.4)	−32.3 (−26.1)	−21.9 (−7.4)	−6.7 (19.9)	5.8 (42.4)	10.1 (50.2)	5.7 (42.3)	−3.3 (26.1)	−15.9 (3.4)	−24.3 (−11.7)	−29.2 (−20.6)	−14.8 (5.4)
Daily mean °C (°F)	−35.9 (−32.6)	−36.8 (−34.2)	−35.9 (−32.6)	−25.9 (−14.6)	−9.9 (14.2)	3.1 (37.6)	6.8 (44.2)	3.4 (38.1)	−5.8 (21.6)	−19.5 (−3.1)	−28.0 (−18.4)	−32.8 (−27.0)	−18.1 (−0.6)
Mean daily minimum °C (°F)	−39.5 (−39.1)	−40.5 (−40.9)	−39.4 (−38.9)	−29.8 (−21.6)	−13.1 (8.4)	0.5 (32.9)	3.5 (38.3)	1.2 (34.2)	−8.2 (17.2)	−23.1 (−9.6)	−31.6 (−24.9)	−36.3 (−33.3)	−21.4 (−6.5)
Record low °C (°F)	−53.3 (−63.9)	−55.3 (−67.5)	−52.8 (−63.0)	−48.9 (−56.0)	−31.1 (−24.0)	−13.9 (7.0)	−2.2 (28.0)	−12.9 (8.8)	−31.7 (−25.1)	−41.7 (−43.1)	−48.2 (−54.8)	−51.7 (−61.1)	−55.3 (−67.5)
Record low wind chill	−72.1	−69.5	−66.9	−59.3	−43.2	−20.7	−7.0	−17.4	−40.3	−52.1	−61.3	−66.3	−72.1
Average precipitation mm (inches)	2.6 (0.10)	2.6 (0.10)	2.6 (0.10)	3.6 (0.14)	3.3 (0.13)	8.6 (0.34)	14.4 (0.57)	17.9 (0.70)	8.2 (0.32)	6.6 (0.26)	3.7 (0.15)	3.5 (0.14)	77.6 (3.06)
Average rainfall mm (inches)	0.0 (0.0)	0.0 (0.0)	0.0 (0.0)	0.0 (0.0)	0.0 (0.0)	6.1 (0.24)	14.0 (0.55)	13.1 (0.52)	0.3 (0.01)	0.0 (0.0)	0.0 (0.0)	0.0 (0.0)	33.5 (1.32)
Average snowfall cm (inches)	3.7 (1.5)	3.9 (1.5)	4.0 (1.6)	4.4 (1.7)	4.7 (1.9)	2.8 (1.1)	1.0 (0.4)	5.5 (2.2)	11.3 (4.4)	10.1 (4.0)	5.6 (2.2)	5.5 (2.2)	62.5 (24.6)
Average precipitation days (≥ 0.2 mm)	4.4	4.4	5.3	4.9	3.9	5.2	7.8	7.9	6.8	8.6	5.9	5.4	70.6
Average rainy days (≥ 0.2 mm)	0.0	0.0	0.0	0.0	0.0	3.5	7.7	6.0	0.16	0.0	0.0	0.0	17.4
Average snowy days (≥ 0.2 cm)	4.5	4.8	5.2	4.8	4.0	2.3	0.79	2.8	7.1	9.0	6.2	5.2	56.8
Average relative humidity (%) (at 1500 LST)	64.5	66.5	66.2	64.9	71.9	70.3	67.4	75.7	81.7	75.0	66.9	66.5	69.8
Mean monthly sunshine hours	0.0	0.0	118	355.1	520.7	405	341.2	240.1	101.8	8.6	0.0	0.0	2,090.5
Source: Environment and Climate Change Canada (sun 1951–1980)

Climate data for Alert (Alert Airport) Climate ID: 2400300; coordinates 82°31′04″N 62°16′50″W; elevation: 30.5 m (100 ft); 1991–2020 normals, extremes 1950–present (Note: Climate data 1991–2020 is a composite recorded at Alert Upper Air, Alert Climate (WMO ID: 71082 / 71355; Climate ID: 2400306 / 2400305; coordinates 82°30′N 62°20′W; elevation: 65.4 m (215 ft)), and Alert (Climate ID: 2400300; coordinates 82°31′04″N 62°16′50″W; elevation: 30.5 m (100 ft)))
Month	Jan	Feb	Mar	Apr	May	Jun	Jul	Aug	Sep	Oct	Nov	Dec	Year
Record high humidex	0.0	0.0	−2.4	−1.1	8.1	18.6	20.2	23.8	8.4	4.6	−1.1	1.4	23.8
Record high °C (°F)	1.8 (35.2)	1.1 (34.0)	−2.2 (28.0)	2.4 (36.3)	10.0 (50.0)	18.8 (65.8)	21.0 (69.8)	19.5 (67.1)	11.2 (52.2)	5.3 (41.5)	0.6 (33.1)	3.2 (37.8)	21.0 (69.8)
Mean daily maximum °C (°F)	−27.0 (−16.6)	−27.6 (−17.7)	−27.1 (−16.8)	−19.4 (−2.9)	−8.2 (17.2)	2.4 (36.3)	6.8 (44.2)	3.8 (38.8)	−5.1 (22.8)	−13.6 (7.5)	−20.4 (−4.7)	−24.3 (−11.7)	−13.3 (8.1)
Daily mean °C (°F)	−30.7 (−23.3)	−31.4 (−24.5)	−31.0 (−23.8)	−23.3 (−9.9)	−11.1 (12.0)	0.1 (32.2)	3.9 (39.0)	1.2 (34.2)	−8.0 (17.6)	−17.2 (1.0)	−24.1 (−11.4)	−28.1 (−18.6)	−16.7 (1.9)
Mean daily minimum °C (°F)	−34.4 (−29.9)	−35.2 (−31.4)	−34.9 (−30.8)	−27.0 (−16.6)	−14.0 (6.8)	−2.3 (27.9)	1.0 (33.8)	−1.4 (29.5)	−10.9 (12.4)	−20.7 (−5.3)	−27.8 (−18.0)	−31.9 (−25.4)	−20.0 (−4.0)
Record low °C (°F)	−48.9 (−56.0)	−50.0 (−58.0)	−49.4 (−56.9)	−45.6 (−50.1)	−29.0 (−20.2)	−14.3 (6.3)	−6.3 (20.7)	−15.0 (5.0)	−28.2 (−18.8)	−39.4 (−38.9)	−43.5 (−46.3)	−46.1 (−51.0)	−50.0 (−58.0)
Record low wind chill	−64.7	−60.5	−59.5	−56.8	−40.8	−21.1	−10.3	−19.2	−36.9	−49.4	−53.7	−57.3	−64.7
Average precipitation mm (inches)	10.5 (0.41)	7.3 (0.29)	10.3 (0.41)	11.5 (0.45)	11.6 (0.46)	11.1 (0.44)	21.5 (0.85)	18.4 (0.72)	17.8 (0.70)	12.1 (0.48)	11.5 (0.45)	8.5 (0.33)	152.0 (5.98)
Average rainfall mm (inches)	0.0 (0.0)	0.0 (0.0)	0.0 (0.0)	0.0 (0.0)	0.0 (0.0)	2.3 (0.09)	10.8 (0.43)	5.3 (0.21)	0.2 (0.01)	0.0 (0.0)	0.0 (0.0)	0.0 (0.0)	18.5 (0.73)
Average snowfall cm (inches)	12.7 (5.0)	9.6 (3.8)	12.2 (4.8)	13.2 (5.2)	17.1 (6.7)	11.1 (4.4)	12.8 (5.0)	15.9 (6.3)	30.5 (12.0)	25.5 (10.0)	18.3 (7.2)	13.0 (5.1)	191.7 (75.5)
Average precipitation days (≥ 0.2 mm)	12.4	8.8	11.5	10.1	9.0	7.6	9.6	10.0	11.2	12.3	10.6	10.9	124.1
Average rainy days (≥ 0.2 mm)	0.0	0.0	0.0	0.0	0.1	1.7	5.7	3.4	0.5	0.0	0.0	0.0	11.3
Average snowy days (≥ 0.2 cm)	11.6	9.7	10.2	8.7	9.4	5.4	4.1	6.8	11.5	13.0	10.7	11.1	112.2
Average relative humidity (%) (at 1500 LST)	70.8	70.4	70.1	72.4	81.3	84.5	81.7	84.4	85.3	79.3	73.6	71.8	77.1
Mean monthly sunshine hours	0.0	0.0	110.4	323.6	428.6	333.0	321.6	269.1	111.4	3.9	0.0	0.0	1,901.6
Percentage possible sunshine	0.0	0.0	33.1	46.8	57.6	46.3	43.2	36.2	21.9	4.1	0.0	0.0	24.1
Source: Environment and Climate Change Canada (sun 1981–2010) (April maximum)

==== Climate change ====
A paleolimnological study of algae in the sediments of shallow ponds on Cape Herschel, which faces Smith Sound on Ellesmere's eastern coast, found that the ponds had been permanent and relatively stable for several millennia, until experiencing ecological changes associated with global warming, beginning around 1850 and accelerating in the early 2000s. During the 23-year study period, an ecological threshold was crossed as several of the study ponds had completely desiccated while others had significantly reduced water levels. In addition, the wetlands surrounding the ponds were severely affected, and dry vegetation there was highly flammable.

=== Glaciers, ice caps and ice shelves ===
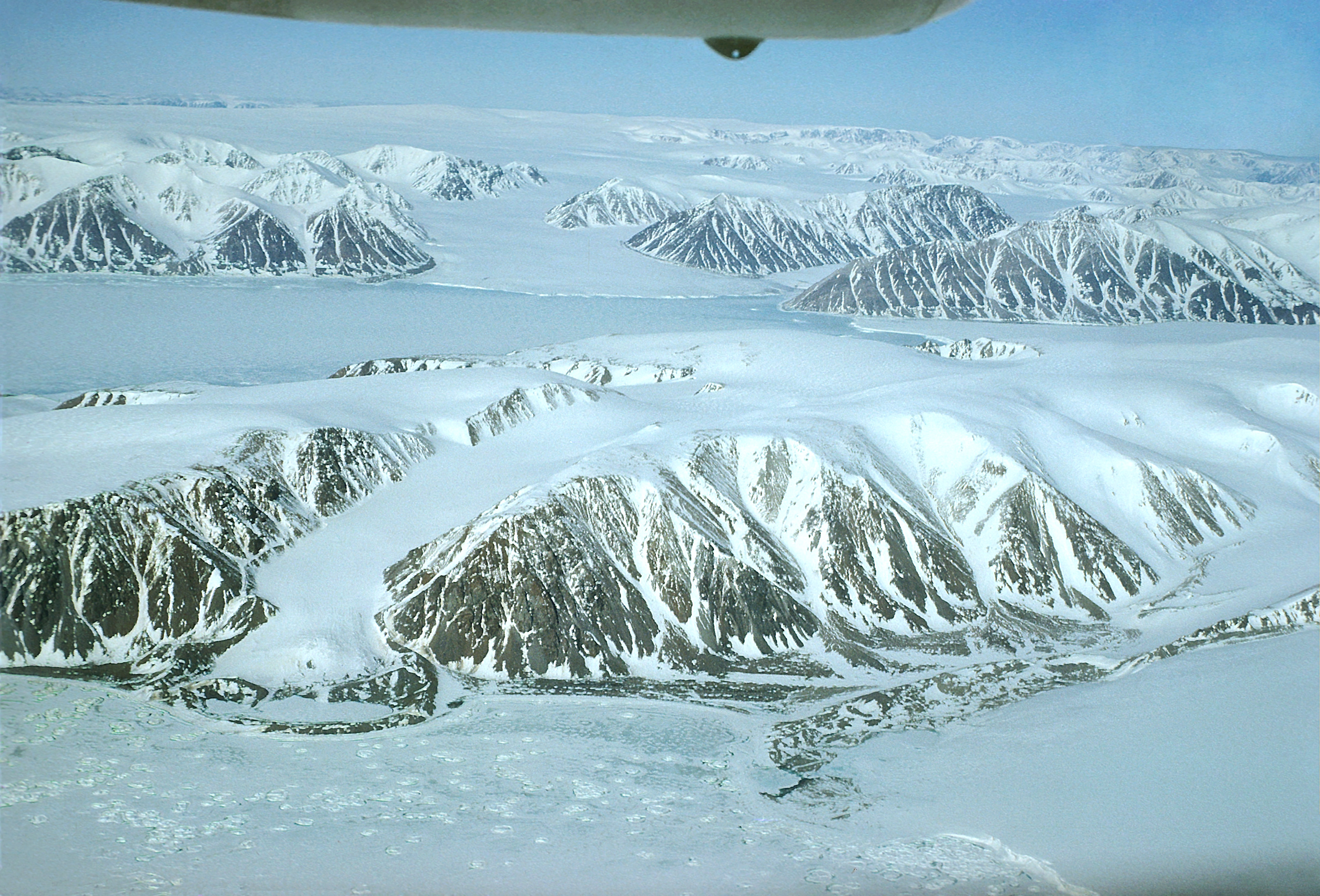
Glaciers of southeastern Ellesmere Island, June 1975

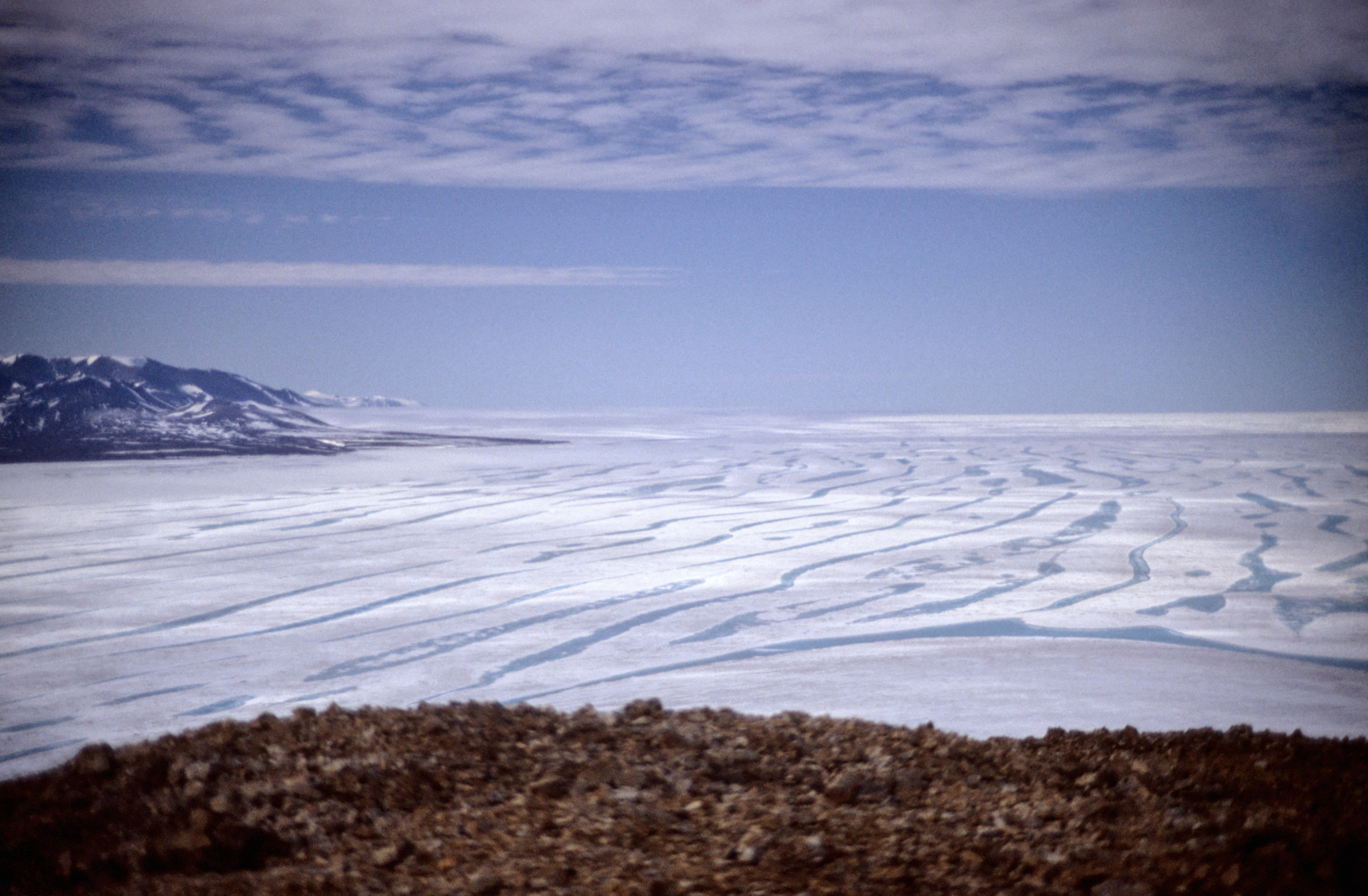
Ward Hunt Island (foreground), Ward Hunt Ice Shelf and northern Ellesmere Island (left), July 1988

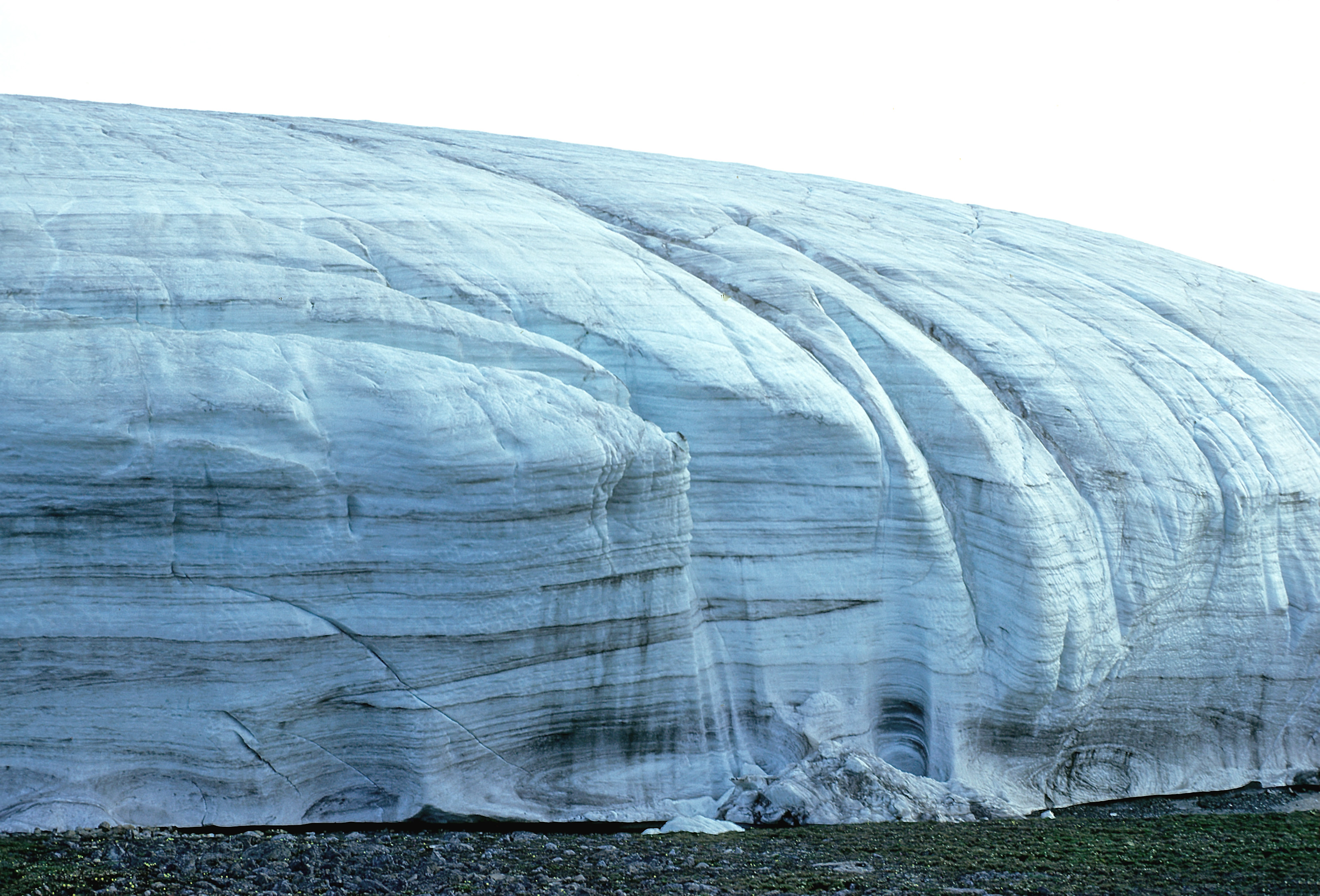
The overhanging ice front of Webber Glacier with waterfalls. Debris rich layers of the ground moraine are sheared and folded into the ice of the advancing polar glacier. The glacier front is 6 km (3.7 mi) broad and up to 40 m (130 ft) high. Borup Fiord, Grant Land, Ellesmere Island, July 1978

Large portions of Ellesmere Island are covered with ice and glaciers, with Manson Icefield (6,200 km^{2} (2,400 sq mi)) and Sydkap (3,700 km^{2} (1,400 sq mi)) in the south, Prince of Wales Icefield (20,700 km^{2} (8,000 sq mi)) and Agassiz Ice Cap (21,500 km^{2} (8,300 sq mi)) along the central-east side of the island, and the Northern Ellesmere icefields (24,400 km^{2} (9,400 sq mi)). The northwest coast of Ellesmere Island was covered by a massive, 500 km (310 mi) long ice shelf until the 20th century. The Ellesmere Ice Shelf shrank by 90% in the 20th century due to warming trends in the Arctic, particularly in the 1930s and 1940s, a period when the largest ice islands (the 520 km^{2} (200 sq mi) T1 and the 780 km^{2} (300 sq mi) T2 ice islands) were formed leaving the separate Alfred Ernest, Ayles, Milne, Ward Hunt, and Markham Ice Shelves. The Ward Hunt Ice Shelf, the largest remaining section of thick (>10 m >33 ft) landfast sea ice along the northern coastline of Ellesmere Island, lost almost 600 km^{2} (230 sq mi) of ice in a massive calving in 1961–1962. Five large ice islands which resulted account for 79% of the calved material. It further decreased by 27% in thickness (13 m (43 ft)) between 1967 and 1999. A 1986 survey of Canadian ice shelves found that 48 km^{2} (19 sq mi) or 3.3 cubic kilometres (0.79 cu mi) of ice calved from the Milne and Ayles ice shelves between 1959 and 1974.

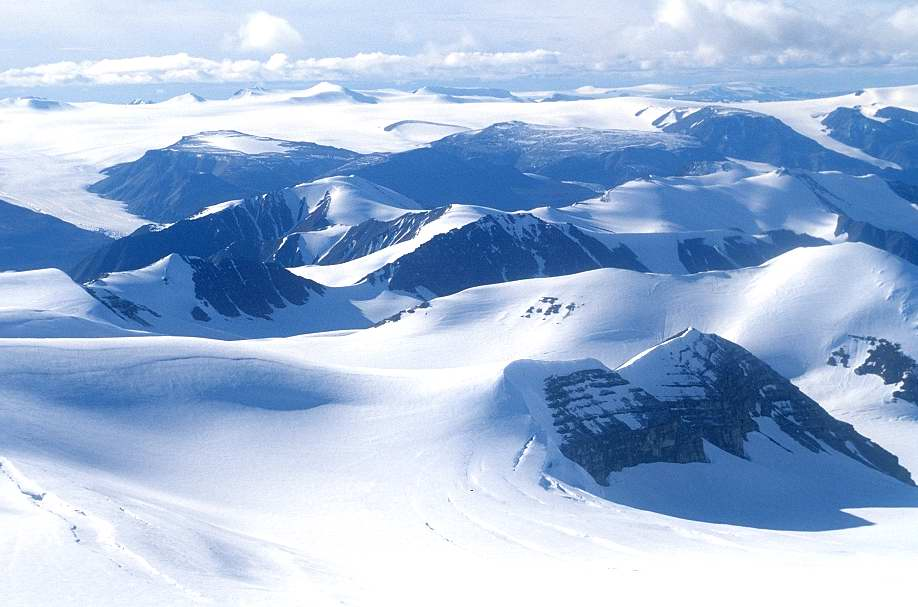
The Osborn Range of the Arctic Cordillera mountain system

The breakup of the Ellesmere Ice Shelves has continued in the 21st century: the Ward Ice Shelf experienced a major breakup during the summer of 2002; the Ayles Ice Shelf calved entirely on 13 August 2005; the largest breakoff of the ice shelf in 25 years, it may pose a threat to the oil industry in the Beaufort Sea. The piece is 66 km^{2} (25 sq mi). In April 2008, it was discovered that the Ward Hunt shelf was fractured, with dozens of deep, multi-faceted cracks and in September 2008 the Markham shelf (50 km^{2} (19 sq mi)) completely broke off to become floating sea ice. A 2018 study measured a 5.9% reduction in area amongst 1,773 glaciers in northern Ellesmere island in the 16-year period 1999–2015 based on satellite data. In the same period, 19 out of 27 ice tongues disintegrated to their grounding lines and ice shelves suffered a 42% loss in surface area.

=== Paleontology ===
Canada's northern neighbours shown on a circumpolar projection of the Arctic

Schei and later Alfred Gabriel Nathorst described the Paleocene-Eocene (ca. 55 Ma) fossil forest in the Stenkul Fiord sediments. The Stenkul Fiord site represents a series of deltaic swamp and floodplain forests. The trees stood for at least 400 years. Individual stumps and stems of >1 m >3.3 ft diameter were abundant, and are identified as Metasequoia and possibly Glyptostrobus. Well preserved Pliocene peats containing abundant vertebrate and plant macrofossils characteristic of a boreal forest have been reported from Strathcona Fiord. In 2006, University of Chicago paleontologist Neil Shubin and Academy of Natural Sciences paleontologist Ted Daeschler reported the discovery of the fossil of a Paleozoic (ca. 375 Ma) fish, named Tiktaalik roseae, in the former stream beds of Ellesmere Island. The fossil exhibits many characteristics of fish, but also indicates a transitional creature that may be a predecessor of amphibians, reptiles, birds, and mammals, including humans. In 2011, Jason P. Downs and co-authors described the sarcopterygian Laccognathus embryi from specimens collected from the same locality that Tiktaalik was found.

=== Ecology ===
The ecosystems of the High Arctic are considered to be young and underdeveloped, having only emerged since the glacial retreat of 8,000 to 6,000 BCE. There is a lack of species diversity, with a small number of animal species and short food chains.

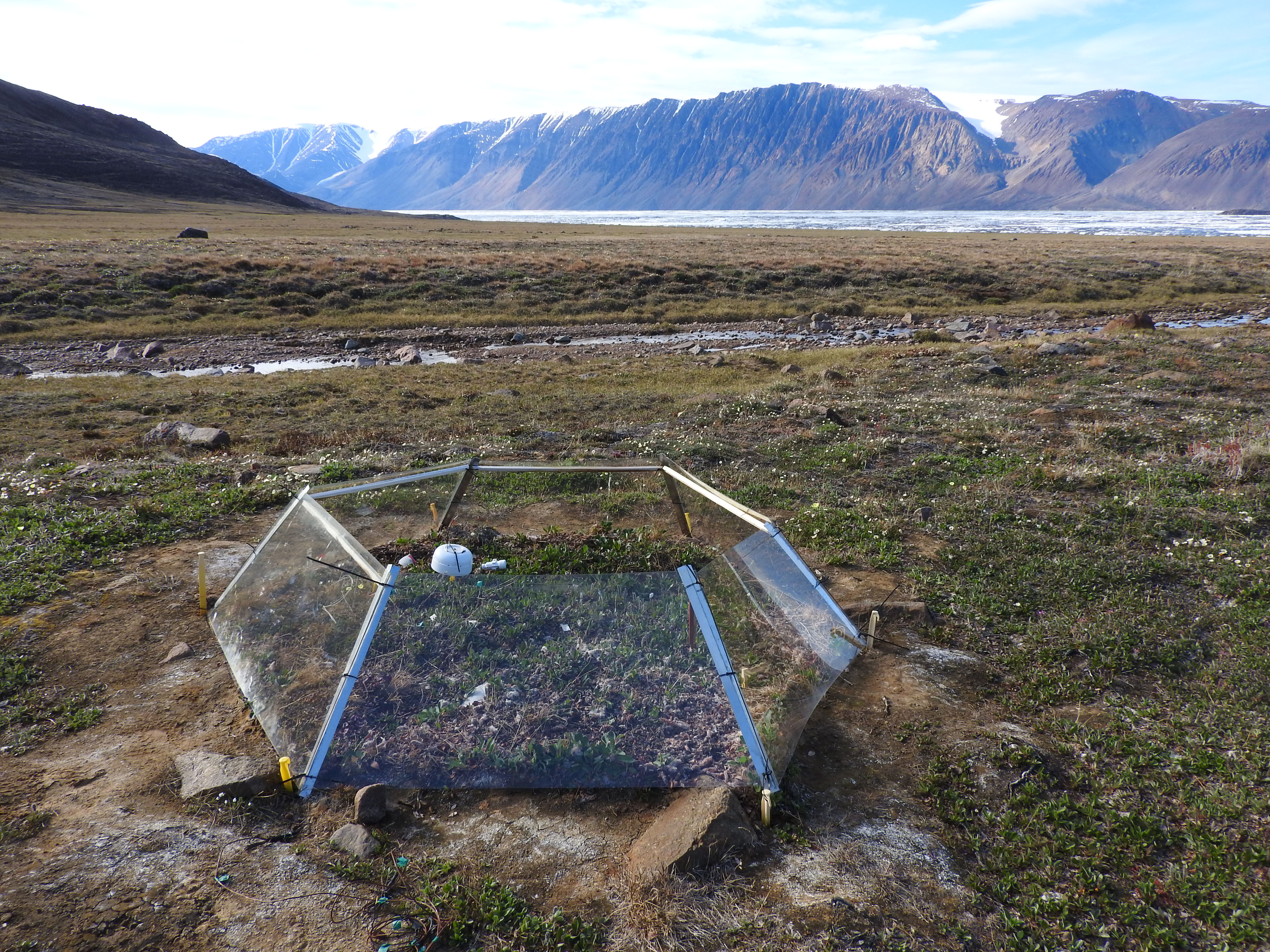
International Tundra Experiment on Ellesmere Island

These species have adapted to take advantage of the productive summer while surviving through winter scarcity. Zooplankton, for example, grow to a larger body size and produce larger eggs in greater numbers than in other regions. Aside from the polar desert conditions of much of the island, there are remarkably productive ecological zones in the Arctic oasis of the Lake Hazen area and the polynyas of the island's coastal waters.

==== Insect ecology ====
Ellesmere Island is noted as being the northernmost occurrence of eusocial insects; specifically, the bumblebee Bombus polaris. There is a second species of bumblebee occurring there, Bombus hyperboreus, specifically the Bombus natvigi subspecies, which is a parasite in the nests of B. polaris. While non-eusocial, the Arctic woolly bear moth (Gynaephora groenlandica) can also be found on Ellesmere Island. While this species generally has a 10-year life cycle, its life is known to extend to up to 14 years at both the Alexandra Fiord lowland and Ellesmere Island.

=== Earth's magnetism ===
In 2015, the Earth's geomagnetic north pole was located at approximately 80°22′N 72°37′W, on Ellesmere Island. It was forecasted to remain on Ellesmere Island in 2020, shifting to 80°39′N 72°41′W. As of 2025, the north geomagnetic pole (the south pole of the Earth's magnetic field) was still located on the island at 80°51′N 72°6′W.

== Population ==
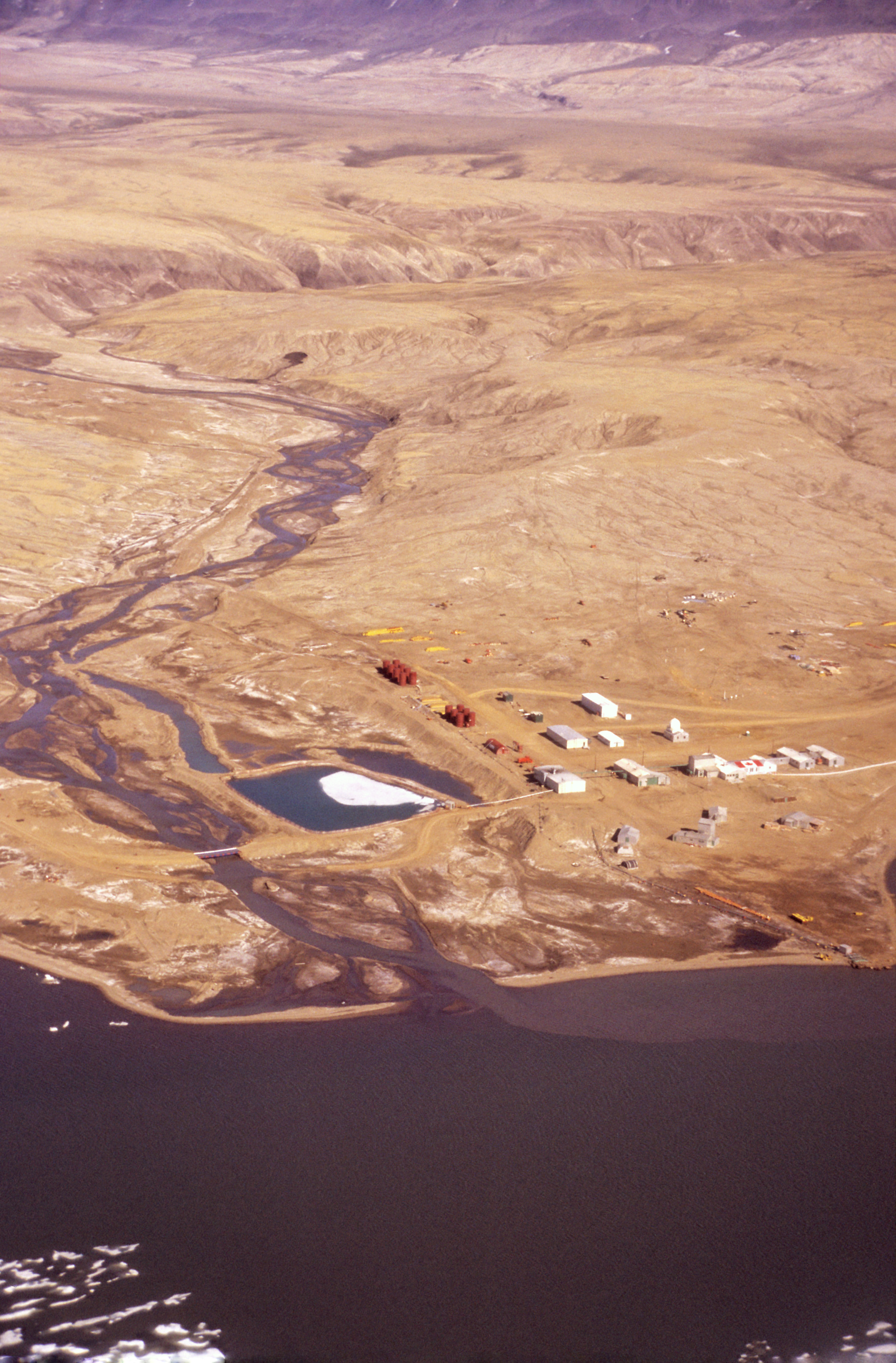
Aerial view of Eureka, June 1988

All groups occupying the island have settled on the coast, particularly those relying on maritime resources, while modern-era government-funded settlements were initially supplied by sea. In 2021, the population of Ellesmere Island was recorded as 144. There are three settlements on Ellesmere Island: Alert (permanent pop. 0, but home to a small temporary population), Eureka (permanent pop. 0), and Grise Fiord (pop. 144). Politically, it is part of the Qikiqtaaluk Region. Part of the year there are also Parks Canada staff stationed at Camp Hazen and Tanquary Fiord Airport.

=== Alert ===
Canadian Forces Station (CFS) Alert is the northernmost continuously inhabited settlement in the world. With the end of the Cold War and the advent of new technologies allowing for remote interpretation of data, the overwintering population has been reduced to 62 civilians and military personnel as of 2016.

=== Eureka ===
Eureka (the third northernmost settlement in the world) consists of three areas: Eureka Aerodrome, which includes Fort Eureka (the quarters for military personnel maintaining the island's communications equipment); the Environment and Climate Change Canada Weather Station; and the Polar Environment Atmospheric Research Laboratory (PEARL), formerly the Arctic Stratospheric Ozone (AStrO) Observatory. Eureka has the lowest average annual temperature and least precipitation of any weather station in Canada.

=== Grise Fiord ===
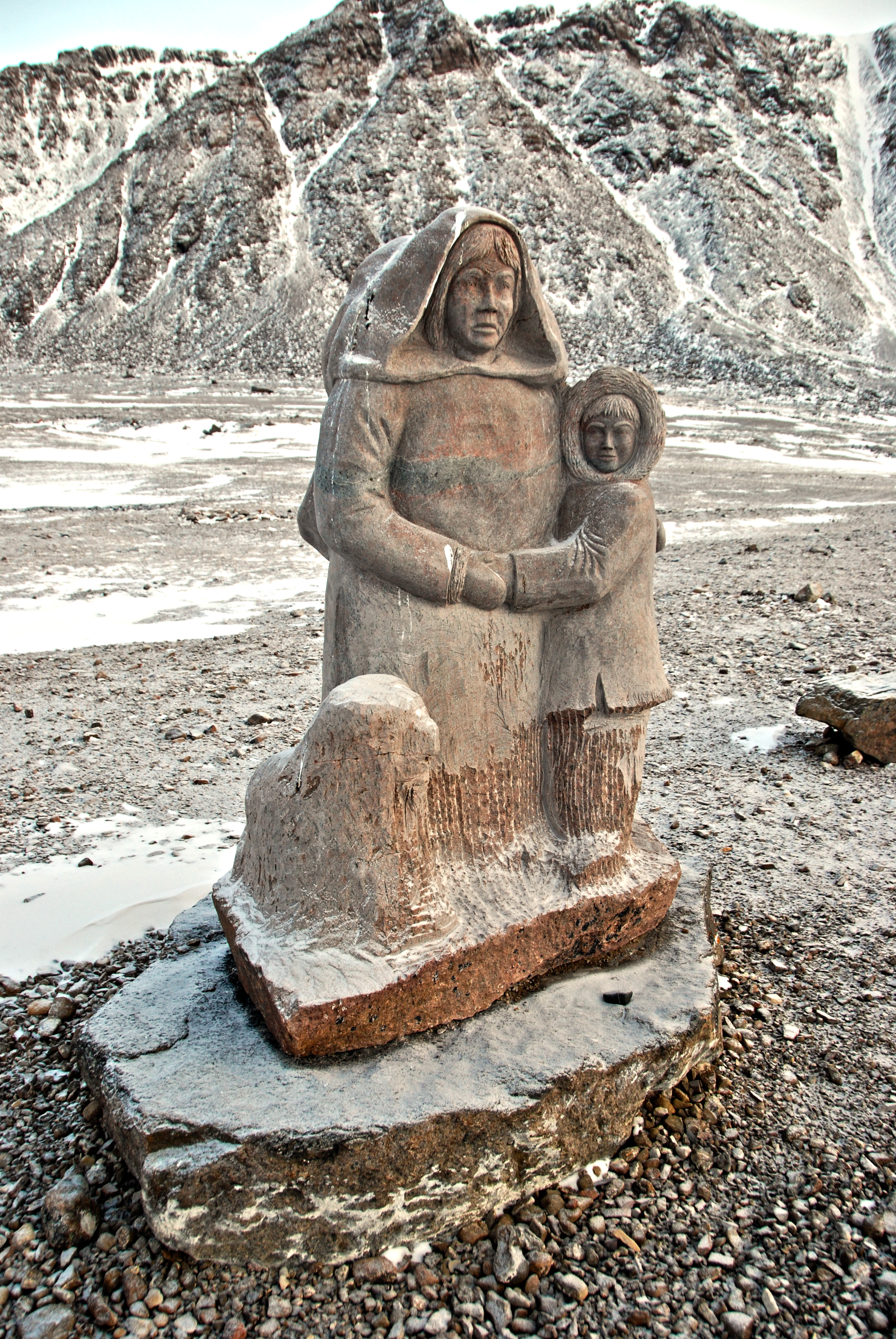
Monument to the first Inuit settlers relocated to Grise Fiord in 1952–55. This was during Canada's controversial High Arctic relocation program

Grise Fiord (Inuktitut: ᐊᐅᔪᐃᑦᑐᖅ, Romanized: Aujuittuq, lit. "place that never thaws") is an Inuit hamlet that, despite a population of only 144, is the largest community on Ellesmere Island. Located at the southern tip of Ellesmere Island, Grise Fiord lies 1,160 km (720 mi) north of the Arctic Circle. Grise Fiord is the northernmost civilian settlement in Canada. It is also one of the coldest inhabited places in the world, with an average yearly temperature of −16.5 °C (2.3 °F). It was created during the High Arctic relocation program when Inuit were forced from their traditional homes in Quebec to become "human flagpoles". Grise Fiord is cradled by the Arctic Cordillera mountain range.

== Transportation ==
Transportation along coastal waters has been historically important for hunting and trade, whether on the sea ice or in small boats. The ice foot, a belt of level and secure ice around the shoreline between the high and low water marks, can be used from mid-September to July. In contrast, the pack ice does not stabilize and freeze fast until February, and presents a much rougher surface for travel. The navigation season for seagoing vessels is from late July to September, but is often considered treacherous due to currents, persistent shore ice, sea ice, and massive icebergs calved off of the many glaciers. September also marks a change in the weather with regular fog and the beginning of the autumn storm season.

== In popular culture ==
Ellesmere Island is the setting of much of Melanie McGrath's The Long Exile: A True Story of Deception and Survival Amongst the Inuit of the Canadian Arctic about the High Arctic relocation, and also of her Edie Kiglatuk mystery series. In Man of Steel, a 2013 American superhero film, Ellesmere Island is the site of a combined United States-Canadian scientific expedition to recover an ancient Kryptonian spaceship buried in the glacial ice pack. The island is the location for the 2014 BBC program Snow Wolf Family and Me. The 2008 documentary Exile by Zacharias Kunuk documents the experiences of Inuit families who were forcibly relocated to Grise Fiord on Ellesmere Island in the 1950s, to settle it for the Canadian government. The families discuss being deceived by the government about the locale's conditions and about the agreement's terms and, then, surviving in inhospitable conditions with little food or water. In 2022, the US National Museum of Wildlife Art debuted the travelling exhibit Wolves: Photography by Ronan Donovan. The exhibit was developed in collaboration with the National Geographic Society and features images and videos of the Arctic wolves living on Ellesmere Island.

== See also ==
- Lomonosov Ridge
- Ledoyom
- Serson Ice Shelf
- Borup Fiord Pass
