= Charles Harington =

Charles Harington may refer to:

- Sir Charles Harington (British Army officer, born 1872) (1872–1940), British Army general
- Charles Herbert Harington (1874–1941), commandant of the British North Borneo Constabulary
- Sir Charles Harington (chemist) (1897–1972), Welsh chemist
- Sir Charles Harington (British Army officer, born 1910) (1910–2007), British Army general
- Charles Richard Harington (born 1933), Canadian zoologist
