= Strathcona Fiord =

Fjord in Nunavut, Canada

- Location in Nunavut
- Location: Ellesmere Island, Nunavut
- Coordinates: 78°43′N 82°55′W
- Ocean/sea sources: Bay Fiord
- Basin countries: Canada

Strathcona Fiord is a fiord on the west central coast of Ellesmere Island, the most northern island within the Arctic Archipelago, Nunavut, Canada.

== Geography ==
Strathcona Fiord is a southern tributary of Bay Fiord. The landscape in the region is fragile and spectacular. The steep hills forming the sides of the valley rise about 400 m (1,300 ft) above sea level. The striking arc of a terminal moraine marks the limit of the last ice advance in the area. Taggart Lake running eastward of the moraine drains Upper and Lower Taggart lakes into the head of the fiord. The Prince of Wales Icefield lies on the eastern flank of this valley.

== Human activity ==
Although currently there is no permanent settlement in the Strathcona Fiord area, stone tent rings and other archaeological features indicate past human habitation. Eureka, about 170 km (110 mi) to the northwest, is a weather station and staging point for scientific expeditions and for other visitors to Ellesmere Island and the Qikiqtaaluk Region. Grise Fiord is an Inuit community, located about 250 km (160 mi) to the south, also on Ellesmere Island.

A parcel of land located south of the head of Strathcona Fiord is designated Inuit Owned Land. The area is sometimes visited by hunters from the nearest Inuit community, Grise Fiord.

== Coal ==
A large portion of the Strathcona Fiord area lies within a coal license area, owned by Canadian Sovereign Coal Corporation, a subsidiary of Weststar Resources Corporation. The coal property is governed by three coal exploration licenses covering an area of 37,628 ha (92,980 acres). Coal deposits in the Strathcona Fiord area are ranked from lignite to sub-bituminous and have been estimated to comprise roughly 1 billion tonnes.

In January 2010, when the paleontological scientific community learned of Weststar's interest in exploring this area the Society of Vertebrate Paleontology issued a press release outlining the need to preserve the fossils in the area, Within four days the Nunavut Impact Review Board received over 70 letters of concern from paleontologists and the public alike.

== Paleontology ==
The vicinity of Strathcona Fiord has yielded a fossil record of tremendous international scientific significance. These fossils, including plant and animal remains, have provided a unique opportunity for understanding the effect of climatic change through the past 4 or 5 million years on the Arctic environment, and on its flora and fauna.

=== Pliocene fossils (3-5 million years old) ===
The only Pliocene High Arctic vertebrate fossil locality known is the Beaver Pond site at Strathcona Fiord. The Beaver Pond site was first noted by John Fyles of the Geological Survey of Canada in 1961. In 1988 he found the first vertebrate remains there. In 1992 vertebrate paleontologist, Richard Harington of the Canadian Museum of Nature, began ten summers of excavations at the site.

This fossil site includes the mummified remains of fossil plants, including trees such as an extinct larch (Larix groenlandii) and other trees indicative of a boreal forest. Much of the wood preserved at the site has been gnawed by beavers and some of it is fire-blackened. This exceptional site also has yielded remains of pollen, insects, mollusks, fish (a percid), frogs and mammals such as an unusual rodent, a deerlet (Boreameryx), 3-toed horse, an extinct beaver (Dipoides), a rabbit (Hypolagus), an unusual shrew (Arctisorex polaris), a primitive black bear (Ursus abstrusus), a badger (Arctomeles), and several other carnivores.

Paleoclimatic reconstruction suggests a mean annual temperature that was 14–19 °C (25–34 °F) warmer than present day Ellesmere Island. The assemblage of Pliocene plant macrofossils (wood, leaves, cones and seeds) is typical of present-day boreal forest, as it includes alder (Alnus), birch (Betula), bogbean (Menyanthes trifoliata), larch (Larix), sweet gale (Myrica gale), spruce (Picea), pine (Pinus), and lingonberry (Vaccinium vitis-idaea), as well as the southern boreal tree, the white cedar (Thuja occidentalis).

=== Eocene fossils (about 50 million years old) ===
The first High Arctic terrestrial fossil vertebrates were discovered in 1975, in the Strathcona Fiord by a team led by Mary R. Dawson from the Carnegie Museum. These earliest finds include the fossil remains of an alligator, considered to be Allognathosuchus, and also small arboreal mammals called plagiomenids. Since then, field expeditions in Strathcona Fiord have yielded a much more complete picture of the biodiversity of the Eocene Arctic. Although, Eocene fossil vertebrates are known from other areas on Ellesmere Island (e.g., Stenkul Fiord), and Axel Heiberg Island, Strathcona Fiord has yielded the richest vertebrate fossil record. Simialir fossils have been unearthed in the nearby Buchanan Lake Formation.

The fossil vertebrate record of the Eocene Arctic includes giant tortoises, varanid lizards, and boid snakes. Mammal fossils are extremely diverse, including the rhino-like brontotheres, the hippo-like Coryphodon, a tapir like relative (Thuliadanta), an early horse (Hyracotherium?), carnivores (e.g., Viverravus, Miacis), meat-eating creodonts (e.g. Paaeonictis), a mesonychid (Pachyaena), a small swimming carnivore (Pantolestid), a leptictid and at least five rodents (including Paramys and Microparamys). There are over 40 fossil vertebrate sites in the Strathcona Fiord region.

There are numerous Eocene plant fossil sites, including shale units that are rich with leaves as compression fossils. Very notable are the petrified tree stumps, some of which are preserved in their original growth position. The trees show wide growth rings indicating favorable growth conditions. The fossil flora indicates the presence of rich floodplain forests dominated by dawn redwood (Metasequoia glyptostroboides), together with ginkgo (Ginkgo adiantoides), walnut family (Juglans and other Juglandaceae), elms (Ulmus spp.), birch and alder (Betulaceae), and katsura (Cercidiphyllum). Analysis of nearby fossil leaf sites from central Ellesmere Island of the same age indicate that these forests grew under very high rainfall, and can be considered to have represented a polar rainforest.

This lush Eocene ecosystem thrived under a polar light regime. Like today, the region would have seen 24-hour sun in the summer and 24-hour darkness in the winter as it was positioned at almost the same latitude in the Eocene as it is today. Despite an early Eocene climate with generally mild frost-free temperatures, the polar light regime likely forced these plants to be deciduous.
