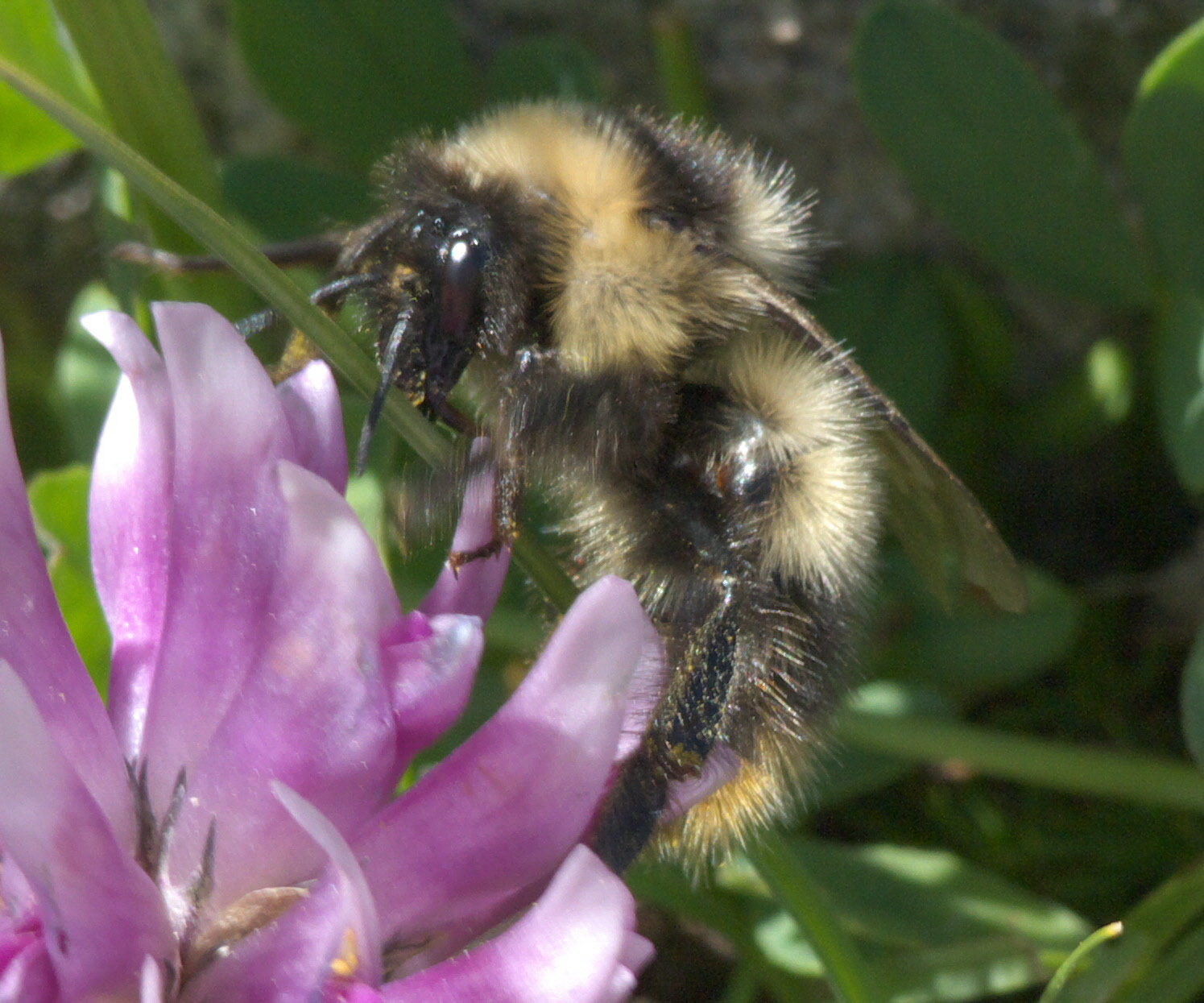

Conservation status
- Data Deficient (IUCN 3.1)

Scientific classification
- Kingdom: Animalia
- Phylum: Arthropoda
- Clade: Pancrustacea
- Class: Insecta
- Order: Hymenoptera
- Family: Apidae
- Genus: Bombus
- Species: B. kirbiellus

Binomial name
- Bombus kirbiellus Curtis, 1835

Synonyms
- Bombus atrifasciatus Morrill, 1903; Bombus kirbyellus Smith, 1854; Bombus putnami Cresson, 1879; Bremus kirbyellus subsp. alexanderi Frison, 1923; Bremus kirbyellus subsp. arizonensis Frison, 1923; Psithyrus kodiakensis Ashmead, 1902

= Bombus kirbiellus =

Species of bumble bee

Bombus kirbiellus is a hymenopterous insect in the bee family. The scientific name of the species was first validly published in 1835 by Curtis. The species is found in Canada and the United States, and is on the IUCN Red List as having insufficient data to make an assessment.
