= Charles Richard Harington =

Canadian zoologist (1933–2021)

Charles Richard Harington (May 22, 1933 – September 8, 2021) was a Canadian zoologist.

== Life and career ==
Harington was born in Calgary in May 1933.

After working for geophysical companies in Alberta, and for the Arctic Institute of North America in Ottawa, he spent a year on northern Ellesmere Island during the International Geophysical Year, 1957–58, and came full circle in the summer of 2008 by carrying out field work on Ellesmere Island during the International Polar Year. From 1960-65, he worked as a Canadian Wildlife Service biologist, specializing in polar bear and muskox research.

In 1965, he was appointed Curator of Quaternary Zoology with the National Museums of Canada and was Chief of the Paleobiology Division (1982–91). He carried out detailed studies of the ice age animals of the Yukon, concentrating his work on the unglaciated country near Dawson and Old Crow; and on Pliocene vertebrates and environments of Ellesmere Island where he spent 10 field seasons between 1992 and 2008 leading a team collecting fossils from a unique four-million-year-old vertebrate site (the Beaver Pond site) near the head of Strathcona Fiord. His interests include: the ice age vertebrates of Canada, Alaska and Greenland; the evolution and distribution of arctic and alpine mammals; and climatic change in Canada during the ice age. He has written or contributed over 300 scientific papers, publications and reports.

In 2004, Harington received an honorary degree from the University of Alberta.

Harington died in Ottawa on September 8, 2021, at the age of 88.

== Archives ==
There is a Charles R. Harington fonds at the Canadian Museum of Nature Library and Archives.
