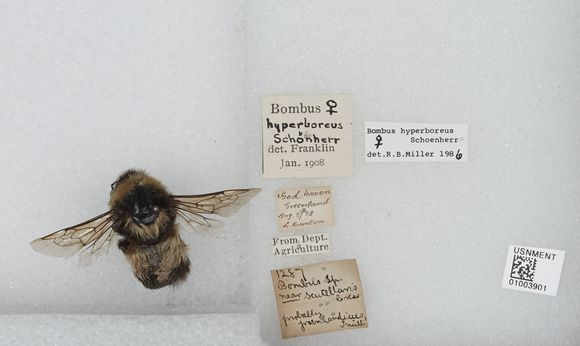
- Specimen of subspecies natvigi from Greenland

Conservation status
- Vulnerable (IUCN 3.1)

Scientific classification
- Kingdom: Animalia
- Phylum: Arthropoda
- Class: Insecta
- Order: Hymenoptera
- Family: Apidae
- Genus: Bombus
- Subgenus: Alpinobombus
- Species: B. hyperboreus

Binomial name
- Bombus hyperboreus Schönherr, 1809

= Bombus hyperboreus =

Species of bee

Bombus hyperboreus is a species of Arctic bumblebee with a circumpolar distribution. The species is primarily found in the arctic areas of Canada, Greenland, northern Scandinavia, and Russia. In 2015, Bombus natvigi, from the Nearctic, was separated from this species, based on genetic analysis. Subsequent studies considered the genetic differentiation too weak for species status, but instead treat natvigi as a subspecies of hyperboreus. Accordingly, Bombus hyperboreus is now considered to have one subspecies (hyperboreus) limited to the Palaearctic, and the other (natvigi) occurring in North America and Greenland.

It is a brood parasite, and attacks and enslaves other bumblebee colonies in order to reproduce as they do not even have the ability to produce workers themselves. Most of its targets are colonies of species of the same subgenus, Alpinobombus.

== Taxonomy and phylogeny ==
Bombus hyperboreus was originally named B. arcticus in 1802. Zoologist Carl Schönherr independently named the species as B. hyperboreus in 1809. It was not until 1950 that B. hyperboreus was used commonly to identify the species, when it was recognized that the name arcticus had been widely misapplied for a different species named in 1824. Petitions were needed to change the name to B. hyperboreus officially, to eliminate confusion with this other species, presently classified as Bombus polaris.

Bombus hyperboreus is part of the genus Bombus, which is composed of all of the bumblebee species. It also falls under the subgenus Alpinobombus and is most closely related to Bombus neoboreus.

It was suggested that Bombus natvigi was a separate species from Bombus hyperboreus based on genetic analysis, but later work using specimens from intermediate geographic areas concluded that this result was spurious, and the two taxa are, at best, subspecies occupying different geographic areas. Bombus h. hyperboreus is from the Palaearctic, while Bombus hyperboreus natvigi is from the Nearctic.

== Description ==
Due to its parasitic lifestyle, workers are rarely present. Queens and drones are similar, with the thorax and anterior part of the abdomen brownish-orange. The thorax has a black transversal band, while the last abdominal segments are black. Because the environment the species inhabits is cold and windy, it is suggested that their black bands act as a method to increase their body temperature through solar radiation, and their long, dense hair coat minimizes insulation loss. The mean length of the queen is relatively large at 18.4 millimetres (0.72 in) and is presumed to allow the species to counter the strong effects of the windy and cold environment.

== Distribution and habitat ==
Members of the subgenus Alpinobombus, including B. hyperboreus, live in grasslands and shrub land in high Arctic and alpine areas, otherwise known as the Arctic tundra. They are distributed in the Arctic, Palearctic, and western Nearctic regions. The distribution of the species in terms of altitude varies depending on the season. During the summer, B. hyperboreus makes use of the entire altitudinal range (350–1,500 metres (1,150–4,920 ft)). However, they tend to inhabit and forage at basal altitudes in the spring and higher altitudes towards the end of the summer and beginning of autumn.

== Diet ==
Bombus hyperboreus have a varied diet and mostly forage on medium to deep flowers. Some species that have been observed pollinating are of the genus Pedicularis, specifically Pedicularis hirsuta and Pedicularis lapponica. However, they are not limited to just those species. Near Lake Latnjajaure of northern Sweden, Bombus hyperboreus have been observed collecting pollen and nectar of Saxifraga oppositifolia and then switching to forage on Astragalus alpinus and Bartsia alpina once those come into flower. The flowers they forage on also vary depending on the season and altitude of their habitation. In Mt. Njulla of northern Sweden, for example, in the beginning of the summer, Rhododendron lapponicum and Salix species dominate their diet, but as the season goes on, their diet changes to consumption of Vaccinium species mid-summer and, finally, to consumption of Astragalus alpinus and Solidago virgaurea towards the beginning of August.

== Colony cycle ==
In the early spring, mated queens emerge from the frozen ground in the tundra and seek out a growing colony of a different bee species. Bombus hyperboreus obtains a colony by killing the queen of the host species and enslaving her workers. The queen produces solely queens and drones. Because queens do not produce workers of their own, they rely on the captured workers to care for them. The number of queens and drones the species produces is far greater than any of the other alpine and non-alpine species of the Arctic region and are most commonly seen from early spring to the end of August, in tandem with the species that it usurps.

== Nesting ==
Nests are mainly found covered by foliage, such as moist, mossy shrub; lichens; twigs; withered leaves of Salix glauca; and dry leaves of Pyrola grandiflora. The entrance to the nest is also usually well camouflaged. Sometimes, waxy coverings are used to support additional foliage above the nest. Inside the nest, many cocoons carry male and queen larvae, with most of the vacated ones containing honey, and a few containing pollen. The nests have a tremendous amount of honey (15 millilitres (0.53 imp fl oz; 0.51 US fl oz)), considering that a majority of the hive is composed of sexual beings—queens and drones—and few workers. The temperatures of the nests are closely regulated and maintained at a range of 25–35 °C (77–95 °F).

Bees of the genus Bombus organize their cocoons in a certain manner. New cocoons are placed slightly to the side of other cocoons so that the emerging adults do not disturb the rest of the cells. After the emergence of the adults, the cocoons are used to store honey or pollen.

== Behavior ==
=== Parasitic behavior ===
Bombus hyperboreus, a cuckoo bumblebee, is known to be a social parasite among the bumblebee family, mostly attacking and enslaving colonies of species of the same subgenus. Though it mostly usurps Bombus polaris, there have been evidence of B. hyperboreus usurping Bombus balteatus and Bombus jonellus as well. Most parasitic bumblebees depend on social bumblebees because they do not have pollen baskets and cannot produce their own wax. However, B. hyperboreus is different: although it is parasitic, it has pollen baskets and collects pollen.

To begin usurpation, an impregnated queen emerges in the spring some time after a B. polaris queen, and searches to invade her nest. After invading her colony, the B. polaris queen is killed and her workers are enslaved. The B. hyperboreus queen lays her first batch of eggs, which emerge as queens and drones and are fed and reared by the enslaved workers. B. hyperboreus evolved traits of social parasitism because it inhabits harsh cold environments and must produce small colonies during short periods when conditions are favorable. These very short periods of time, favorable for founding and reproduction, push B. hyperboreus to invade and enslave other colonies, thereby reducing the time it would take to start a colony on their own.

=== Queen behavior ===
Depending on its habitat, B. hyperboreus queens will exhibit different behavior and will produce different types of offspring. Alpine and Arctic habitats have short growing seasons (2 to 3 months), which pushes the species to produce more sexual individuals (queens and males) instead of workers. Additionally, queens found in Scandinavia have been found to actively collect nectar and pollen while those found in Arctic Canada have not been found to do so. The queens also invade and usurp other colonies once they emerge, and rely on the workers to help rear new queens and drones.

=== Mating behavior ===
To mate, males, otherwise known as drones, patrol circuits of scent marks to find queens. B. hyperboreus have been found to have certain compounds that mark their pheromones. These include octadecenol, 2,3-dihydro-6-transfarnesol, citronellol, and geranylcitronellol.

== Risk of predation ==
There is not much information on the predators that threaten B. hyperboreus. The few predators they have include:

- Foxes
- Wheatears
- Humans

== Competition ==
B. hyperboreus compete with many other species of the same subgenus for resources and habitats. The alpine species (species that mostly occupy high altitudes) that it competes with include B. alpinus and B. polaris. The non-alpine species it competes with include Bombus pratorum, B. jonellus, B. pascuorum, B. lucorum, B. lapponicus, and B. balteatus. However, it mostly encounters alpine species because they usually share the same altitude at different times of the season and thus compete for the same resources at the same time.

== Importance to humans ==
Bumblebees play a vital role in propagation of certain flower species as well as production of crops for human consumption. However, due to pesticide use, urban development, and climate change, bumblebee species are being threatened. With rising temperatures and longer periods of drought, Bombus hyperboreus are experiencing loss of habitat and are declining in numbers, placing them as "Vulnerable" on the International Union for Conservation of Nature (IUCN) Red List.
