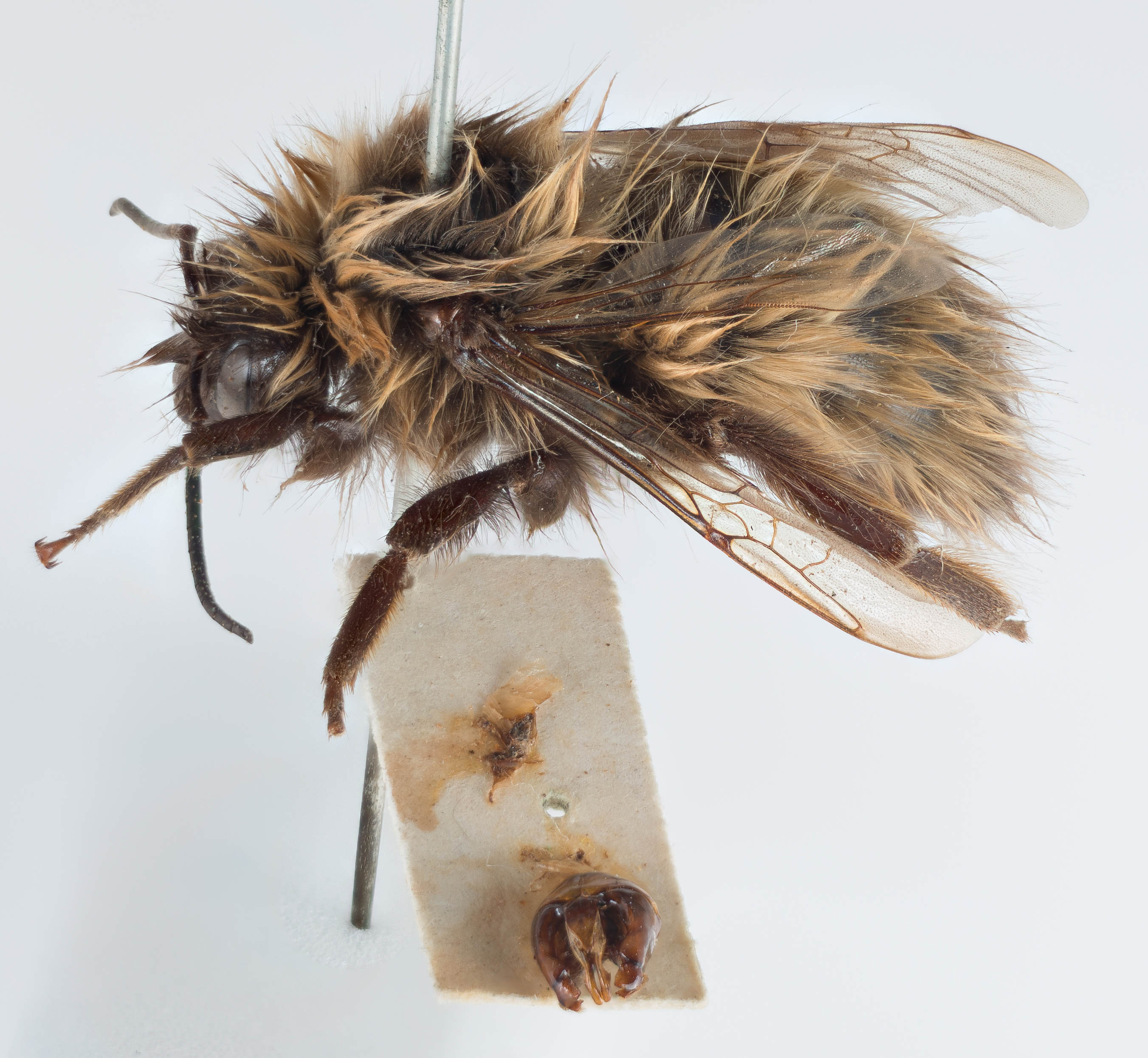

Conservation status
- Data Deficient (IUCN 3.1)

Scientific classification
- Kingdom: Animalia
- Phylum: Arthropoda
- Class: Insecta
- Order: Hymenoptera
- Family: Apidae
- Genus: Bombus
- Species: B. natvigi

Binomial name
- Bombus natvigi Richards, 1931

= Bombus natvigi =

Species of bee

Bombus natvigi (also referred to as the high arctic bumble bee) is a species of cuckoo bumblebee found in northern Canada and Alaska. They were originally considered a synonym of Bombus hyperboreus but were recognised as a valid species in 2015. These bumblebees can be identified by their plain black heads, yellow and black banded thorax and abdomen consisting of two yellow segments of the metasoma follow by four black segments. They are brood parasites of Bombus polaris, with females using pheromones to invade colonies and alter worker bee behaviour to make them tend to her and their broods. Bombus natvigi is currently listed as "data deficient" by the IUCN Red List.
