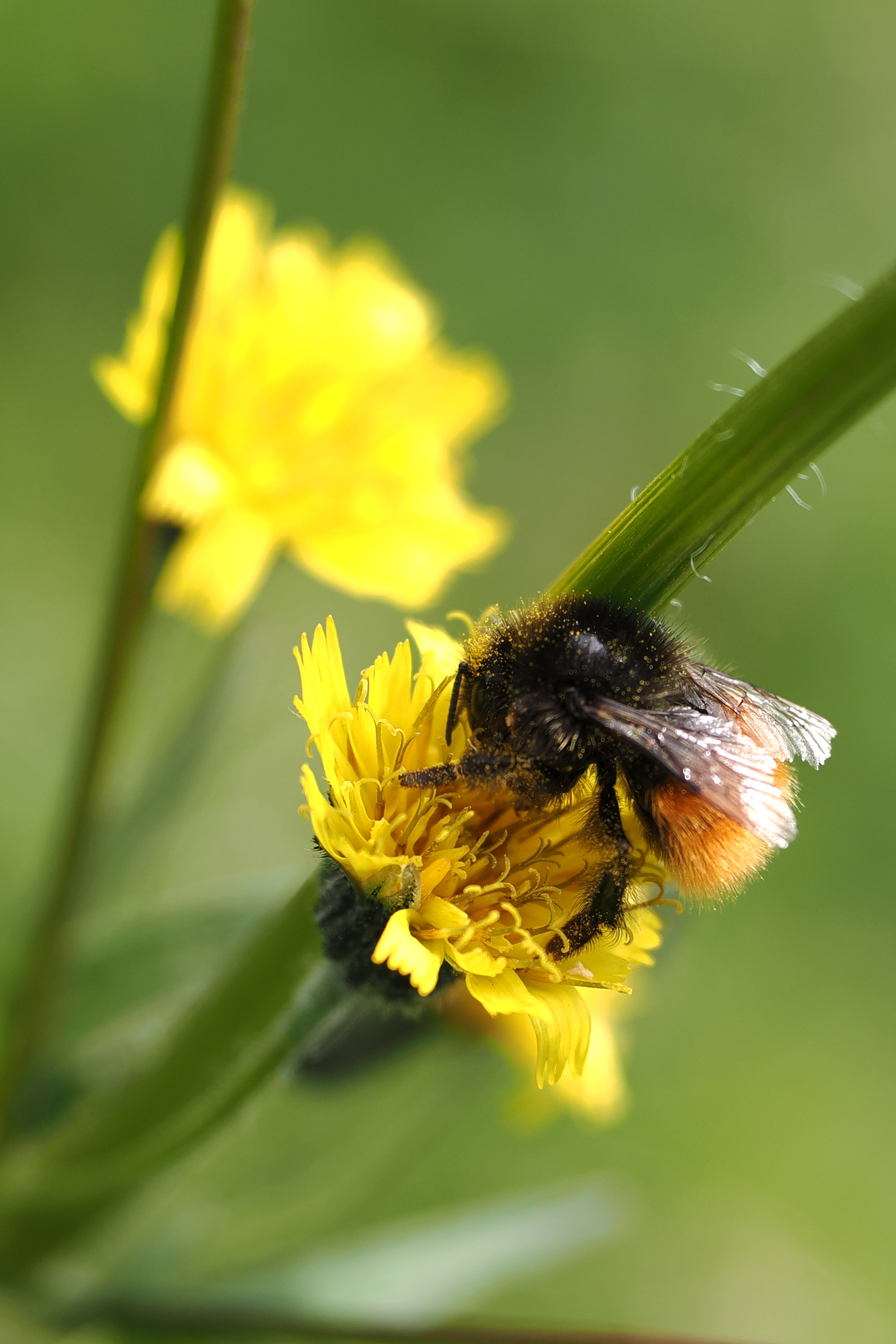
- Nordland, Norway, 2023

Conservation status
- Vulnerable (IUCN 3.1)

Scientific classification
- Kingdom: Animalia
- Phylum: Arthropoda
- Class: Insecta
- Order: Hymenoptera
- Family: Apidae
- Genus: Bombus
- Subgenus: Alpinobombus
- Species: B. alpinus

Binomial name
- Bombus alpinus (Linnaeus, 1758)

Synonyms
- Apis alpina Linnaeus, 1758; Bombus helleri Dalla Torre, 1882

= Bombus alpinus =

Species of bee

Bombus alpinus (Alpine Bumblebee) is a species of bumblebee. It is native to Europe and Eurasia, where it occurs in Austria, Finland, France, Germany, Italy, Norway, Romania, Russia, Sweden, and Switzerland.

This bee occurs in tundra habitats and alpine climates on mountains. It can be found in mountain meadows, heaths, and willow woodlands. It collects pollen from mountain plants such as willows, bog blueberry, bird's-foot trefoil, and louseworts.

Some populations are threatened by habitat degradation caused by climate change.

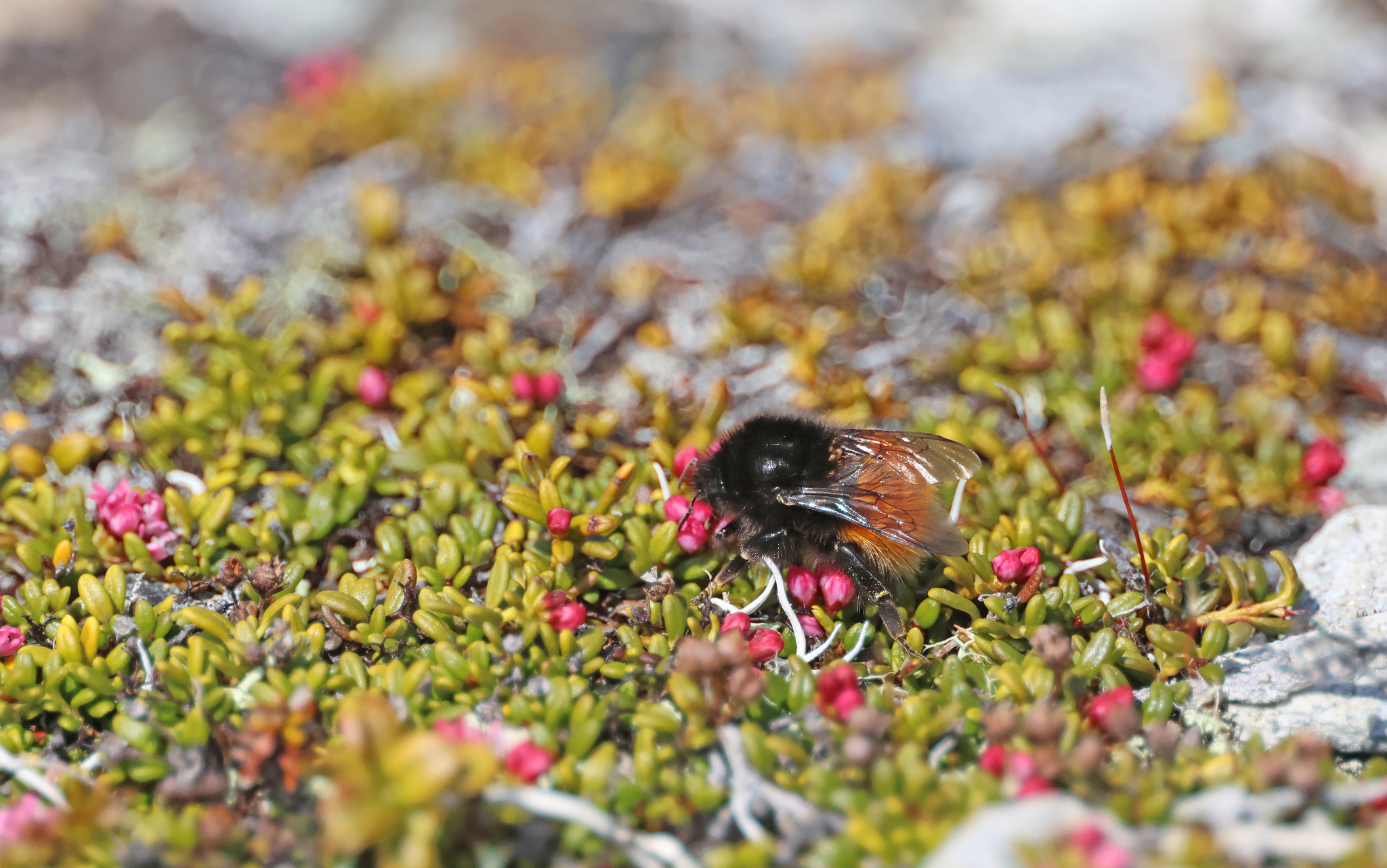
Berg Municipality, Sweden 2023
