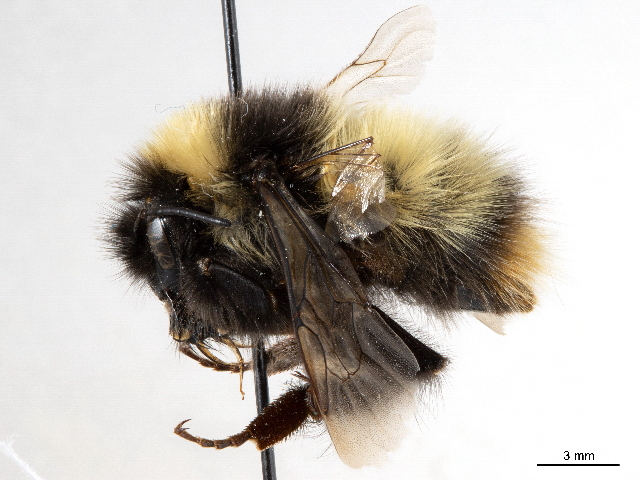

Conservation status
- Vulnerable (NatureServe)

Scientific classification
- Domain: Eukaryota
- Kingdom: Animalia
- Phylum: Arthropoda
- Class: Insecta
- Order: Hymenoptera
- Family: Apidae
- Genus: Bombus
- Subgenus: Alpinobombus
- Species: B. neoboreus

Binomial name
- Bombus neoboreus Sladen, 1919

= Bombus neoboreus =

Species of bee

Bombus neoboreus, the active bumble bee, is a species of bumblebee. It is native to Canada, its distribution extending west into Alaska. It is an arctic species.
