= Albert Hastings Markham =

British explorer, author, and Royal Navy officer (1841–1918)

Admiral Sir Albert Hastings Markham KCB
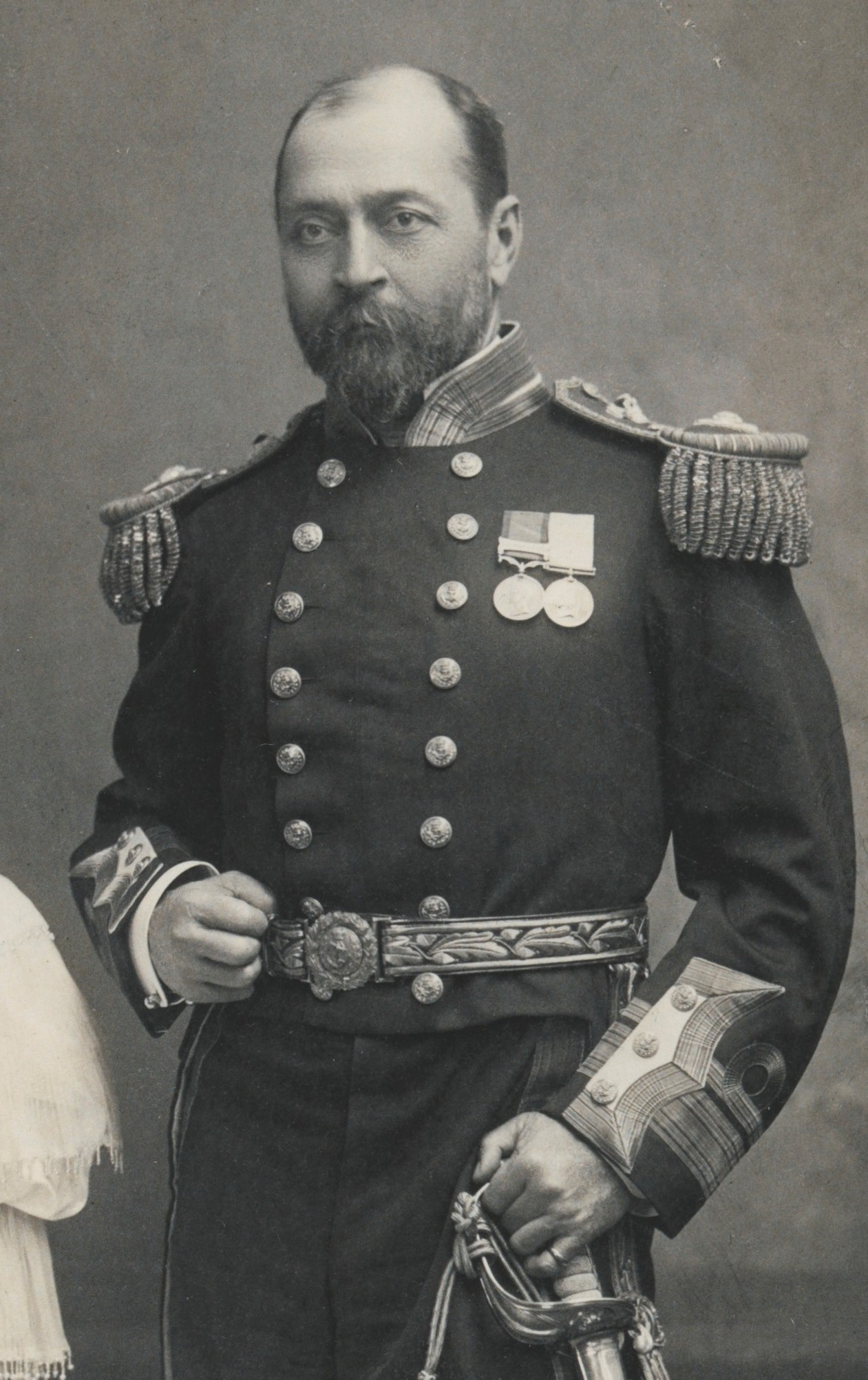
- Markham as a Rear-Admiral between 1894-1897
- Born: Albert Hastings Markham; 11 November 1841; Bagnères-de-Bigorre, France
- Died: 28 October 1918 (aged 76); London, England
- Relatives: Father: Captain John Markham; Mother: Marianne Markham (née Wood); Wife: Theodora Markham (née Gervers); Cousin: Sir Clements Robert Markham KCB FRS
- Military career
- Allegiance: United Kingdom
- Branch: Royal Navy
- Service years: 1856–1906
- Rank: Admiral
- Units: HMS Camilla; HMS Niger; HMS Retribution; HMS Imperieuse; HMS Coromandel; HMS Centaur; HMS Victoria; HMS Blanche; HMS Sultan; HMS Alert
- Commands: HMS Rosario; HMS Triumph; HMS Vernon (Torpedo School); Commodore of the Training Squadron; Second-in-command of the Mediterranean Fleet; Commander-in-Chief at the Nore
- Conflicts: Nukapu Expedition
- Awards: ADC; KCB (1903)
- Other work: Arctic Exploration; Council of the Royal Geographical Society; Author

Admiral Sir Albert Hastings Markham KCB (11 November 1841 – 28 October 1918) was a British explorer, author, and officer in the Royal Navy. In 1903 he was invested as a Knight Commander of the Order of the Bath. He is also remembered for designing the flag of New Zealand.

== Family and background ==
Albert Markham was the fifth son of Captain John Markham, who had retired from the navy because of ill health with the rank of lieutenant. John Markham's grandfather, William Markham, had been Archbishop of York. He was a cousin and close friend of Sir Clements Markham.

Albert was born in Bagnères-de-Bigorre in the Hautes-Pyrénées department of France, where his British family lived before moving to a farm on Guernsey. At age thirteen, Albert was sent to London to live with his aunt, the wife of his uncle David Markham (Canon of Windsor from 1827 to 1853), at 4 Onslow Square. Neighbours included the explorer Vice-Admiral Robert FitzRoy and novelist William Thackeray.

He was educated at home and at Eastman's Royal Naval Academy. Markham's father was short of money for his education and had for some time tried to find a naval officer willing to sponsor Albert for admission to the navy. He only succeeded in doing so after Albert had passed the normal entry age of fourteen, but by good luck the admiralty at that time had decided to experiment with accepting older cadets. His aunt's son Clements Markham, who was eleven years older than Albert, had also joined the navy before leaving to become a geographer and explorer. He became a lifelong friend to his cousin Albert and exerted a considerable influence on his career.

When away from Clements and his wife Minna, whom for much of his life he regarded as his only family, Albert was often moody, irritable and defensive. He had a strong sense of duty as a naval officer, which compelled him to serve with a strict adherence to rules and established practices, and strong religious convictions. He did not smoke, allowing that a gentleman might have an occasional cigar, but believing that cigarettes were for effeminate weaklings and that a black pipe ruined mind and body. He did not drink and disapproved of those who did. He found it difficult to socialise with other officers. He disliked the peacetime navy, with its endless social engagements, partying and ritual displays.

Markham's family emigrated to the United States and John Markham bought a farm at La Crosse in Wisconsin. Albert visited them twice and was unimpressed. He found the trains slow, the hotels disreputable, and travelling companions murderous. He was, however, impressed by the wild grandeur and wildlife of the Mississippi Valley and was invited to hunt with General Mackenzie in Indian territory. Throughout his life he enjoyed hunting all manner of beasts. The only killing at which he showed disgust was the drawn-out deaths of whales, which he saw on Arctic voyages.

He married Theodora Gervers in 1894, with whom he had one daughter.

== Naval career ==
The flag of New Zealand as designed by Markham in 1869

Markham had no great conviction for a naval career, but accepted the constraints it placed upon him in return for the opportunities it presented to further his other interests. He followed the advice he had been given to join and stick with the navy, although he suffered from seasickness and disliked the customary cruelty of service punishments. However, his austere upbringing had better suited him to the rigours of navy life than had his cousin's.

Markham joined the Royal Navy in 1856 at the age of 15 and spent the first eight years of his career on the China Station, travelling out in HMS Camilla and later serving on HMS Niger, HMS Retribution, Imperieuse, HMS Coromandel and HMS Centaur.

His brother John was also in Hong Kong, where he was suffering food poisoning from arsenic added to flour by local Chinese people. Chinese pirates were the chief preoccupation of the navy as they would regularly make raids on the harbour. On one occasion aged fifteen Markham led a party of six boys and two marines against a pirate junk. The pirates abandoned ship and those captured were taken ashore and eventually beheaded. On another occasion he commanded a lorcha armed with a 12-pounder howitzer against a pirate ship holding two British captives. After a three-hour fight he boarded the ship with five men while heavily outnumbered and took eleven prisoners. The British prisoners were found to have been crucified, so the pirates were executed. He became acquainted with a British Consulate official who encouraged an interest in ornithology and shooting snipe.

In 1862, Markham received a promotion to lieutenant. In 1864, he returned to Britain where he took naval exams and stayed with Clements and his wife Minna, at what was to be his only permanent home in England for 30 years. In November he was appointed to the last three-decker constructed for the Royal Navy, HMS Victoria, in the Mediterranean. Life sailing in the Levant was considerably less dangerous, and normally only required the arrival of a British ship to settle a dispute. There was plenty of time for leave and Markham visited Turkey, Egypt, the Holy Land, Greece and the Aegean islands. Appointment to the fleet patrolling the eastern end of the Mediterranean was considered by many as less desirable than the western patrol which visited France and Italy, but the historical sites in the east suited Markham's interests. He kept a journal describing the places he visited, as he did throughout his life. One of his greatest delights was to meet Minna and Clements ashore and to accompany them on archaeological expedition in the region.

In 1868, Markham was appointed first lieutenant of HMS Blanche on the Australia Station where he helped suppress "blackbirding", the illegal trading of slaves between Queensland and the South Sea Islands. This included time spent as an acting commander on HMS Rosario. The issue was not straightforward, because the Queensland government was ambivalent towards the trade, which provided workers for its plantations. Some of the native workers were pleased to be travelling to Queensland, while others hated all white men. A bishop and three others were murdered in one incident, and Markham led a party to Nukapu to exact revenge, destroying a local village. Although Markham's actions were supposedly fuelled by his righteous indignation at an attack upon churchmen, he was criticised in parliament and the press for overreacting. The admiralty, however, approved of his actions. Markham himself found the work more worthwhile than the Mediterranean posting, although it meant he no longer saw Clements and Minna.

In 1869 he submitted a design to George Bowen, the Governor of New Zealand, for a national ensign for New Zealand. His proposal, incorporating the Southern Cross, was approved and remains in use to this day.

On 29 November 1872 he was promoted to commander and spent the next six years engaged in Arctic Exploration. As a reward for his efforts in the British Arctic Expedition of 1876, he was promoted to captain. From 1879 to 1882 he was the captain of Triumph, the flagship of the Pacific Station. In 1883 he was appointed as captain of HMS Vernon, a naval torpedo school in Portsmouth. From 1886 to 1889 he acted as commodore of the training squadron, and on 14 May 1888 he was appointed naval aide-de-camp to Queen Victoria. On 1 August 1891, he was promoted to the rank of rear-admiral.

=== Sinking of HMS Victoria ===
Markham was appointed second in command of the Mediterranean fleet on 20 March 1892, commanding the second division. For part of the year the fleet would operate combined, and for part the first division under Vice-Admiral Sir George Tryon visited the eastern Mediterranean, while the second patrolled the west.

On 22 June 1893, the whole fleet was operating together for the annual exercises off the Syrian coast. The two divisions were proceeding in parallel columns headed towards the shore, which meant that shortly they must turn. Tryon issued orders for a turn through 180 degrees, which was to be done by the two columns turning towards each other. The two columns were only three cables apart, but the minimum safe spacing for such a turn was generally considered to be four cables. Markham was faced with a dilemma, what to do when given an order which appeared impossible to carry out safely. He hesitated acknowledging the order (sent by flag signals), but eventually acknowledged it when Tryon queried his delay. Tryon's flagship HMS Victoria executed an extreme tight turn, while Markham executed a slower standard turn. The effect was that Victoria turned slightly faster, and Markham's ship, HMS Camperdown, rammed her towards the bow. Victoria sank within 15 minutes, taking with her 358 men including Tryon.

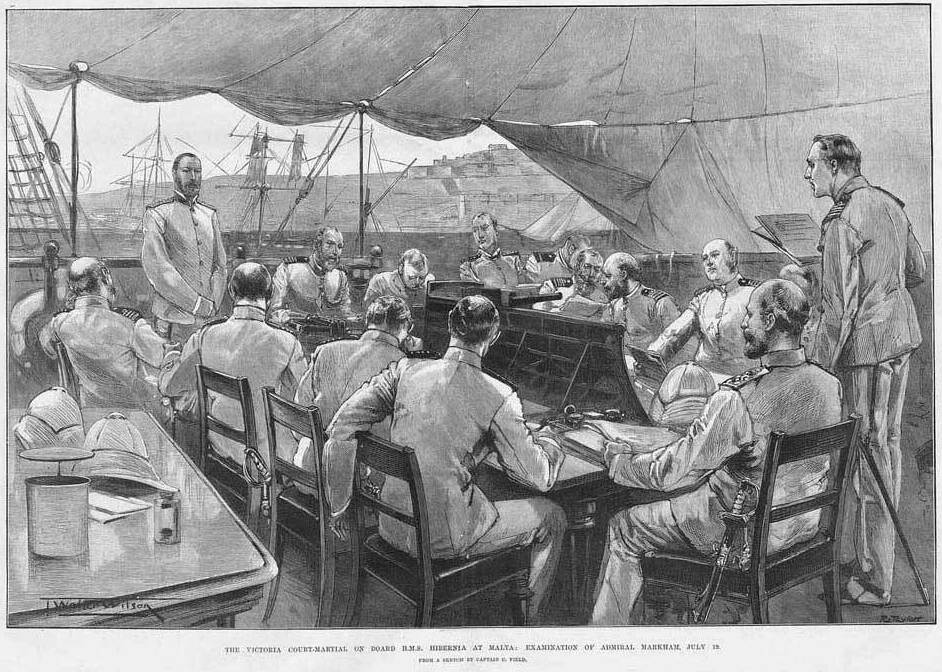
The Victoria court-martial on board HMS Hibernia at Malta, examination of Admiral Markham, 19 July Illustrated London News 1893

The surviving crew of Victoria were court-martialled for the loss of their ship and were exonerated. Markham was not tried so no verdict was passed upon his actions. The Victoria verdict noted that it was difficult to condemn an officer for obeying an explicit command, but regrettable that Markham had accepted the order without query. Markham attempted to obtain his own court martial to clear his name, but was persuaded by the new commander of the Mediterranean fleet and chairman of Victoria's court martial, Admiral Michael Culme-Seymour, that it was not in his best interest to persist in this attempt.

Markham completed his tour of the Mediterranean before a period on half pay without a command. He was promoted to Vice-Admiral on 23 August 1897.

On 1 November 1901, he was made Commander-in-Chief, The Nore, making him responsible for the defence of the port of London and of merchant ships along the East coast of Britain. He hoisted his flag on board the battleship HMS Edinburgh on the same day. He was promoted to the full rank of admiral on 21 January 1903. Stepping down from his command after two years in November 1903, he was made a Knight Commander of the Order of the Bath in the 1903 Birthday Honours on 9 November 1903. He retired from the navy upon reaching the age limit on 11 November 1906. At the outbreak of the First World War he offered his services to the Admiralty, but his services were declined. Instead, he worked for the next four years as treasurer for the Mine Sweepers' Fund. He had just finished some fund work on 23 October 1918 when he fell ill, and died at age 76.

== Exploration ==
Flag flown by Markham on his sledge Marco Polo during the British Arctic Expedition of 1875–1876

In 1873, Markham shipped as the second mate in the whaler Arctic through Davis Straits and Baffin Bay. While performing his share of whaling duties, which he would later write about, he also kept detailed notes on the ice conditions and wrote a report suggesting the route for use with steam vessels.

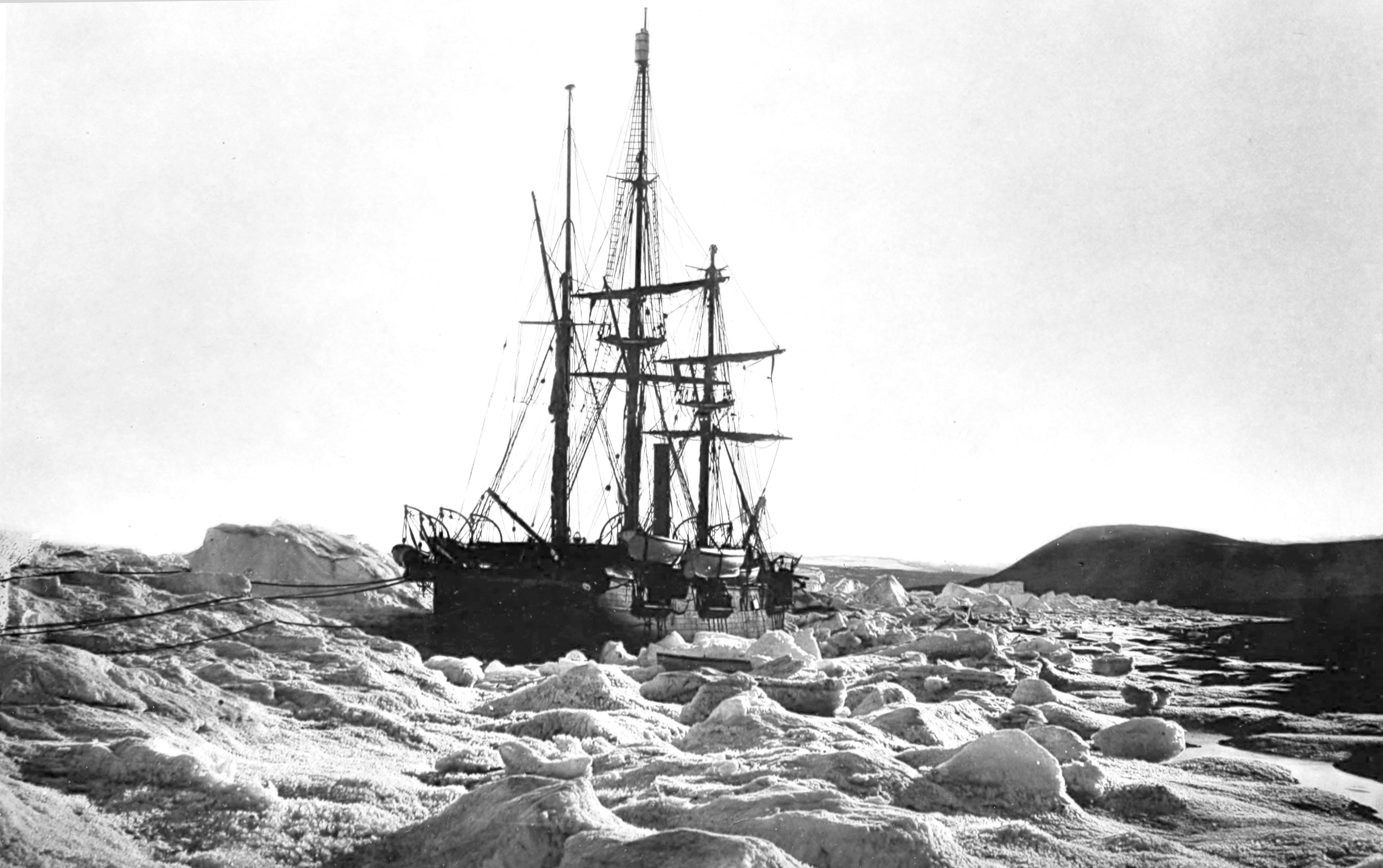
HMS Alert in pack ice during the Arctic Expedition of 1876

For the British Arctic Expedition of 1875–76 he was appointed second-in-command of HMS Alert under Captain Nares. Despite suffering from scurvy and being poorly clothed, he led a sledge-party to reach the highest latitude ever attained at the time (83°20′26″ N), a record that stood for 20 years. They did, however, fail to realize their ultimate goal of reaching the North Pole.

In 1879, Markham accompanied Lars Jorgensen and Sir Henry Gore Booth on a surveying expedition around the Novaya Zemlya archipelago on the Norwegian schooner Isbjörn. Reaching their highest latitude of 78° 24’ N south of Franz Josef Land, the expedition passed through the Matochkin Shar to the Kara Sea, The expedition surveyed the coast, the drift of ice flow and collected natural history specimens as well as participating in hunting and fishing. In 1886, he went alone to report on the ice conditions of Hudson Strait and Hudson Bay, a report which garnered thanks from both Houses of the Canadian Parliament. The ship which took him to Hudson Bay was his old ship Alert from the British Arctic Expedition of 1875–76, by then on loan to the Canadian Marine Service of the Department of Marine and Fisheries.

He served for many years on the Council of the Royal Geographical Society along with his cousin Sir Clements Markham, whose biography he would later write. He remained an avid supporter of both Arctic and Antarctic exploration and delighted in the successes of young explorers.

== Writings ==
Markham wrote numerous books and articles about his exploration as well as two biographies. While stationed in the Pacific from 1879 to 1882 he compiled a list of Pacific gulls which was published in 1882 by the ornithologist Howard Saunders and republished in 1883 by Osbert Salvin. Salvin named a bird, Markham's storm petrel, after him in honor of his contributions to science.

- The New Hebrides and Santa Cruz Groups, South-West Pacific (1871)
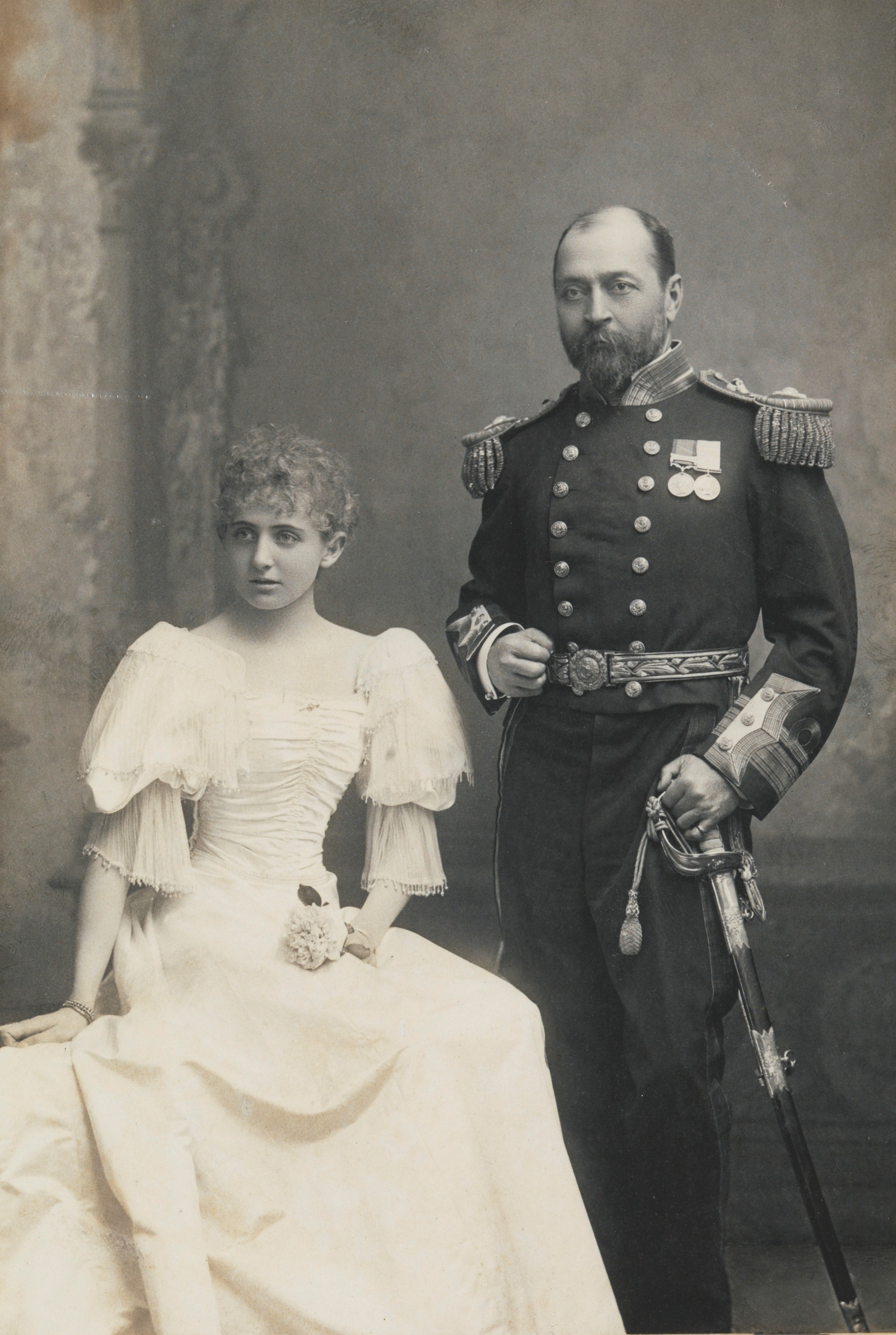
  Sir Albert Markham and Lady Dora Markham
- The New Hebrides and Santa Cruz Groups (1872)
- The Cruise of the 'Rosario' Amongst the New Hebrides and Santa Cruz Islands (1873)
- A Whaling Cruise to Baffin's Bay and the Gulf of Boothia (1874)
- On Sledge Travelling (1876)
- Our Life in the Arctic Regions (1877)
- Northward Ho! (1879)
- The Arctic Campaign of 1879 in the Barents Sea (1880)
- A Visit to the Galapagos Islands in 1880 (1880)
- The Great Frozen Sea (1880)
- A Polar Reconnaissance: Being the Voyage of the 'Isbjörn' to Novaya Zemlya in 1879 (1881)
- Hudson's Bay and Hudson's Strait as a Navigable Channel (1888)
- Life of Sir John Franklin and the North-west Passage (1891)
- The Life of Sir Clements R. Markham, K.C.B., F.R.S (1917)

== Birds discovered by Markham ==
- Waved albatross
- Markham's storm petrel

== Posthumous homage ==
Captain Markham's most northerly encampment, by Admiral Richard Brydges Beechey

Location of geographical features named after Sir Albert Hastings Markham:

- Markgama Island (Russian: Остров Маркгама)
- Cape Alberta Markgama (Russian: Мыс Маркгама), the Northwestern cape of Hooker Island
- Markham Channel (Russian: Земля Зичи)
- Markham Ice Shelf former ice shelf on the Canadian Arctic island Ellesmere Island
- Mount Albert Markham in Antarctica

== See also ==
- Arctic exploration
- History of Antarctica
- List of polar explorers
- List of explorers
- "Archival material relating to Albert Hastings Markham". UK National Archives.

== Notes ==
Military offices
Preceded by Sir William Kennedy	Commander-in-Chief, The Nore; 1901–1903	Succeeded by Sir Hugo Pearson
