= Markgama Island =

Coordinates: 75°16′N 88°05′E

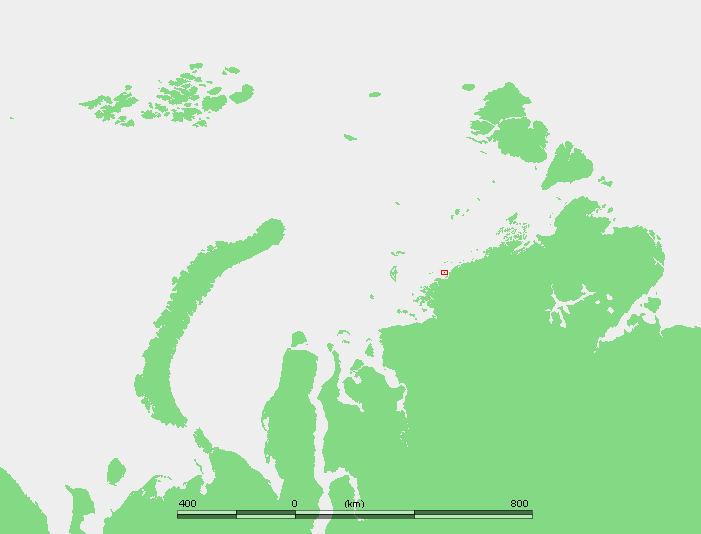
Location of Markgama in the Kara Sea

Markgama, or Markham Island (Russian: Остров Маркгама, literally "Island of Markham") is a small, isolated island in the southern region of the Kara Sea off Sorevnovaniya Bay. The island has only sparse tundra vegetation and is covered with snow for most of the year. The coast of the Taymyr Peninsula is located 15 kilometres (9.3 mi) to the southeast.

The island's length is only 2 kilometres (1.2 mi) and its maximum width is 1.5 kilometres (0.93 mi). The sea surrounding it is covered with pack ice with some polynias in the long winter and there are many ice floes even in the summer.

Markgama belongs to the Krasnoyarsk Krai administrative division of the Russian Federation. It is part of the Great Arctic State Nature Reserve, the largest nature reserve in Russia and one of the biggest in the world.

== History ==
The area around Markgama was explored by Otto Sverdrup on the ship Eklips in 1914 while he was searching for Georgy Brusilov and Vladimir Rusanov. The island was named by Fridtjof Nansen after the British Arctic explorer Clements Robert Markham in 1893.
