= Clements Markham =

British geographer (1830–1916)

Sir Clements Markham KCB FRS FRSGS
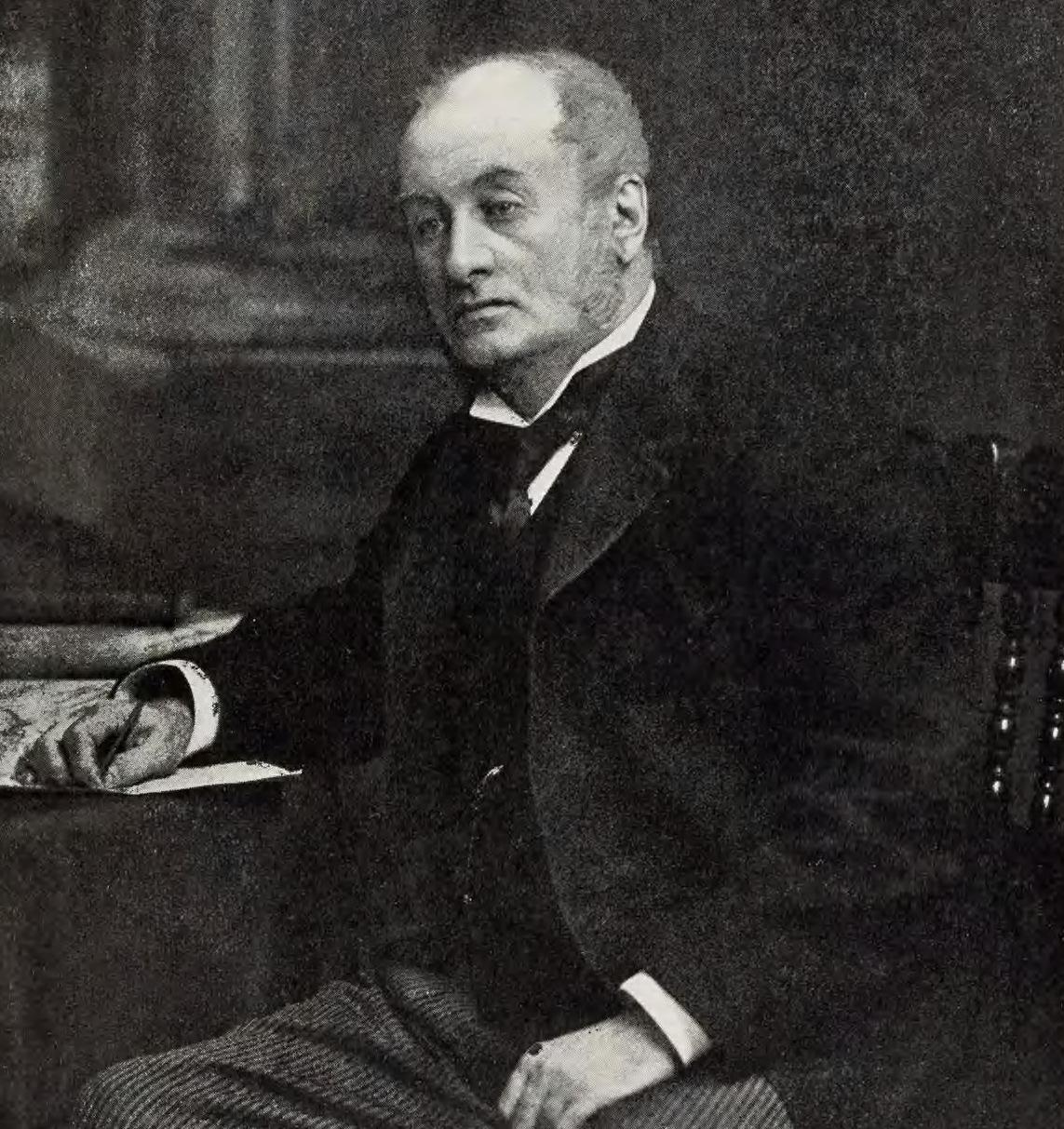
- Markham in 1905

President of the Royal Geographical Society
- In office 29 May 1893 – 22 May 1905
- Preceded by: Sir Mountstuart Duff
- Succeeded by: Sir George Goldie

Personal details
- Born: Clements Robert Markham; 20 July 1830 Stillingfleet, York, England
- Died: 30 January 1916 (aged 85) London, Middlesex, England
- Spouse: Minna Chichester (m. 1857)
- Parent: David Frederick Markham
- Relatives: Sir Albert Markham (cousin)
- Education: Cheam School; Westminster School
- Occupation: Explorer, geographer, writer
- Awards: Royal Geographical Society's Founder's Medal (1888); Knight Commander of the Order of the Bath (1896)

Military service
- Branch: Royal Navy
- Service years: 1844–1852
- Rank: Midshipman
- Ships: Collingwood, Assistance
- Expeditions: Austin expedition (1850)

Sir Clements Robert Markham KCB FRS FRSGS (20 July 1830 – 30 January 1916) was an English geographer, explorer and writer. He was secretary of the Royal Geographical Society (RGS) between 1863 and 1888, and later served as the Society's president for a further 12 years. In the latter capacity he was mainly responsible for organising the British National Antarctic Expedition of 1901–1904, and for launching the polar career of Robert Falcon Scott.

Markham began his career as a Royal Navy cadet and midshipman, during which time he went to the Arctic with HMS Assistance in one of the many searches for Franklin's lost expedition. Later, Markham served as a geographer to the India Office, and was responsible for the collection of cinchona plants from their native Peruvian forests, and their transplantation in India. By this means, the Indian government acquired a home source from which quinine could be extracted. Markham also served as geographer to Sir Robert Napier's Abyssinian expeditionary force, and was present in 1868, at the fall of Magdala.

The main achievement of Markham's RGS presidency was the revival at the end of the 19th century of British interest in Antarctic exploration, after a 50-year interval. He had strong and determined ideas about how the National Antarctic Expedition should be organised, and fought hard to ensure that it was run primarily as a naval enterprise, under Scott's command. To do this he overcame hostility and opposition from much of the scientific community. In the years following the expedition he continued to champion Scott's career, to the extent of disregarding or disparaging the achievements of other contemporary explorers.

All his life Markham was a constant traveller and a prolific writer, his works including histories, travel accounts and biographies. He authored many papers and reports for the RGS, and did much editing and translation work for the Hakluyt Society, of which he also became president in 1890. He received public and academic honours, and was recognised as a major influence on the discipline of geography, although it was acknowledged that much of his work was based on enthusiasm rather than scholarship. Among the geographical features bearing his name is Antarctica's Mount Markham, named after him by Scott in 1902.

== Early life ==
Markham was born on 20 July 1830, at Stillingfleet, now in North Yorkshire, the second son of the Reverend David Frederick Markham, then vicar of Stillingfleet. The family were descendants of William Markham, former Archbishop of York and royal tutor; this Court connection led to David Markham's appointment, in 1827, as an honorary canon of Windsor. Markham's mother Catherine, née Milner, was the daughter of Sir William Milner, 4th Baronet, of Nun Appleton Hall, Yorkshire.

In 1838, David Markham was appointed rector of Great Horkesley, near Colchester, Essex. A year later, Clements began his schooling, first at Cheam School, and later at Westminster School. Reportedly an apt pupil, he showed particular interest in geology and astronomy, and from an early age he wrote prolifically, an activity which filled much of his spare time. At Westminster, which he found "a wonderful and delightful place", he developed a particular interest in boating, often acting as coxswain in races on the River Thames.

== Royal Navy ==
=== Naval cadet, 1844–1850 ===
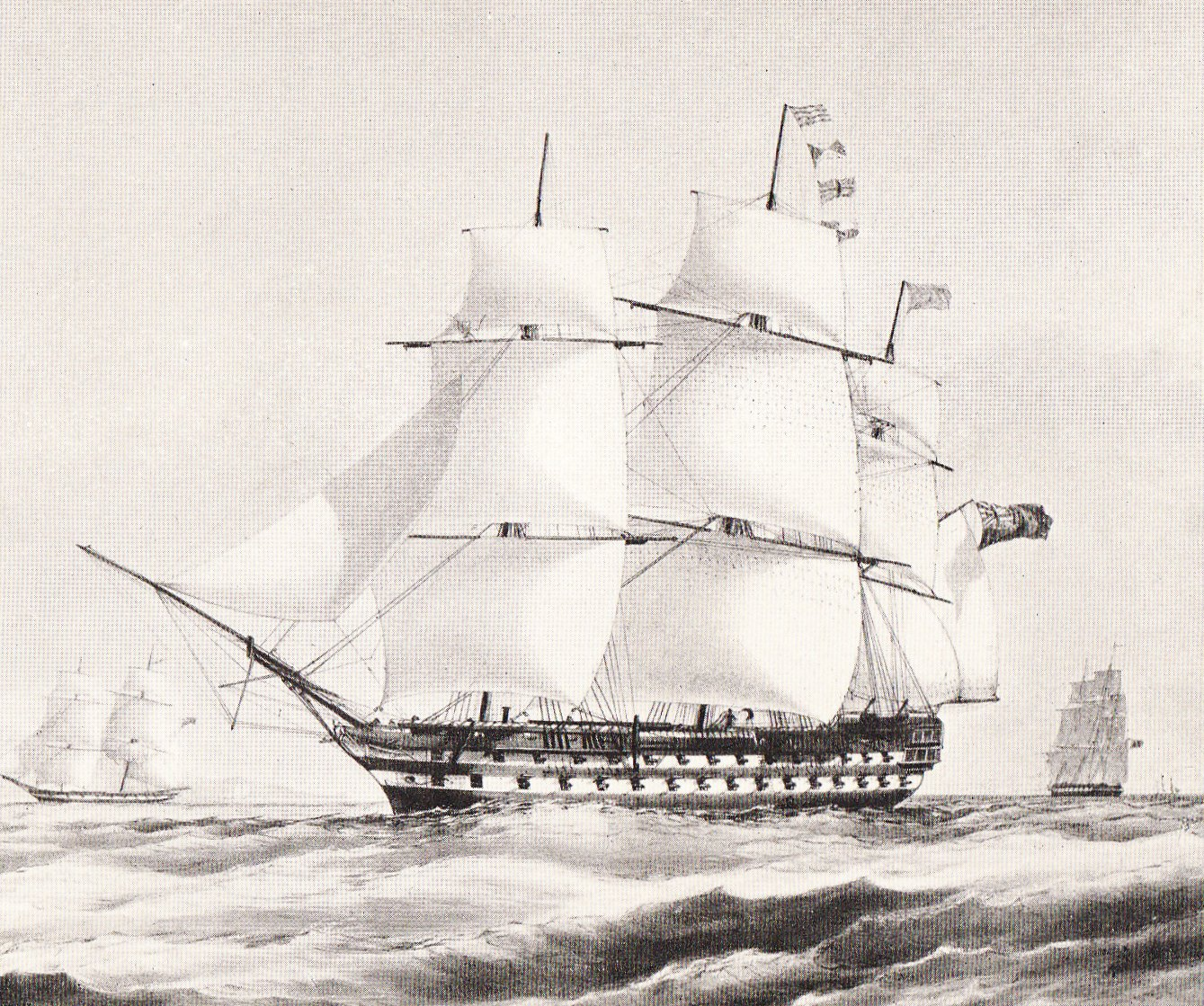
Collingwood, Markham's first ship

In May 1844, Markham was introduced by his aunt, the Countess of Mansfield, to Rear Admiral Sir George Seymour, a Lord of the Admiralty. The boy made a favourable impression on the admiral, and the meeting led to the offer of a cadetship in the Royal Navy. Accordingly, on 28 June 1844, Markham travelled to Portsmouth to join Seymour's flagship, HMS Collingwood. Collingwood was being fitted out for an extended voyage to the Pacific Ocean where Seymour was to assume command of the Pacific station. This tour of duty lasted for almost four years. The ship reached the Chilean port of Valparaíso, the headquarters of the Pacific station on 15 December 1844, after a cruise that incorporated visits to Rio de Janeiro and the Falkland Islands, and a stormy passage in the Southern Ocean. Markham's social connections assured him of a relatively comfortable time; he was frequently invited to dine with the admiral, whose wife and daughters were on board.

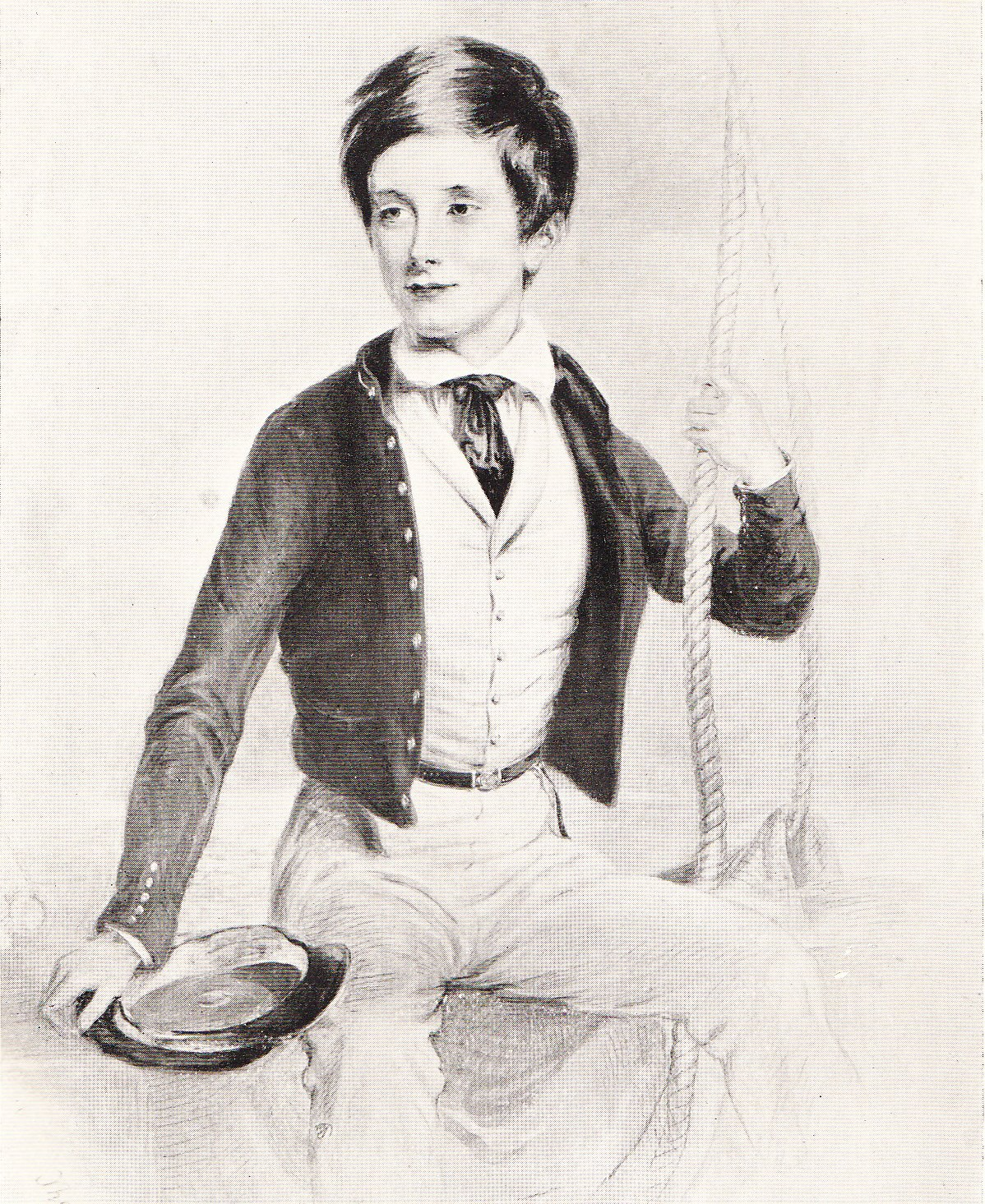
Markham as a naval cadet in 1844, aged 14

After a few weeks' respite in Valparaiso, Collingwood sailed again, this time for Callao, the main port on the Peruvian coast, giving Markham his first experience of a country that would figure prominently in his later career. During the next two years Collingwood cruised in the Pacific, visiting the Sandwich Islands, Mexico, and Tahiti, where Markham attempted to assist the nationalist rebels against their French governor. On 25 June 1846, Markham passed the examination for midshipman, being placed third in a group of ten. The long periods spent in Chilean and Peruvian ports had also enabled him to learn Spanish.

Towards the end of the voyage, Markham experienced growing doubts about a conventional naval career; he now desired above all to be an explorer and a geographer. On arrival in Portsmouth in July 1848 he informed his father of his wish to leave the navy, but was persuaded to stay. After a brief period of service in the Mediterranean Markham experienced months of inactivity while based at Spithead and the Cove of Cork, which further diminished his interest in the service. However, early in 1850, he learned that a squadron of four ships was being assembled to undertake a new search for the lost Arctic expedition of Sir John Franklin. Markham used his family's influence to secure a place in this venture, and in April 1850, was informed of his appointment to HMS Assistance, one of the squadron's two principal vessels.

=== First Arctic voyage, 1850–1851 ===
Sir John Franklin had left England in May 1845 with two ships, HMS Erebus and HMS Terror, in search of the Northwest Passage between the Atlantic and Pacific Oceans. The expedition was last seen on 29 July, by whalers in the northern waters of Baffin Bay, moored to an ice floe and waiting for the chance to sail westward.

The hunt for the missing ships began two years later. The relief squadron which Markham joined was commanded by Captain Horatio Austin in HMS Resolute. Markham's ship Assistance was captained by Erasmus Ommanney. Markham, as the youngest member of the expedition and its only midshipman, had a limited role, but carefully noted every detail of expedition life in his journal. The ships sailed on 4 May 1850.

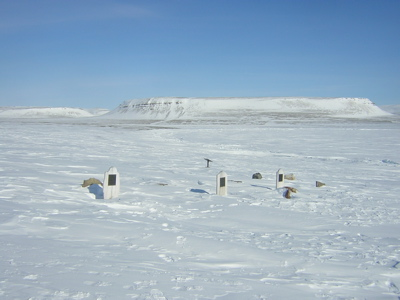
A modern photograph of the graves discovered at Beechey Island in 1850

After rounding the southernmost point of Greenland on 28 May, the squadron proceeded northwards until stopped by ice in Melville Bay on 25 June. They were held here until 18 August, when they were finally able to proceed west into Lancaster Sound, the known route taken by Franklin. Here the ships dispersed to search different areas for signs of the vanished expedition. On 23 August, Ommanney sighted a cairn, and discovered packing materials nearby which bore the name of "Goldner", Franklin's canned meat supplier. Together with other odds and ends of abandoned equipment, these fragments were the first traces of Franklin that anyone had found. A few days later, on Beechey Island, the party came across three graves, which proved to be those of members of Franklin's crew who had died between January and April 1846.

Searches continued until the ships were laid up for the long Arctic winter. During this enforced rest there were lectures and classes for the crew, and various theatrical diversions in which Markham was able to display his "great histrionic talent". He did much reading, mainly Arctic history and classical literature, and thought about a possible return visit to Peru, a country which had captivated him during the Collingwood voyage. When spring returned, a series of sledging expeditions was launched to search for further signs of the missing crews. Markham played a full part in these activities, which produced no further evidence of Franklin, but led to the mapping of hundreds of miles of previously uncharted coast. The expedition returned to England in early October 1851.

Immediately on his return to England, Markham informed his father of his determination to leave the navy. One of the reasons for his disaffection was the severity of the corporal punishment that was constantly administered for what in his view were trivial offences. He had been in trouble during his Collingwood service for attempting to prevent the flogging of a crewman. He had also become disenchanted by the idleness that had occupied long periods of his service. With some regret the elder Markham consented to his son's request, and after taking and passing the gunnery part of the examination for the rank of lieutenant, Markham resigned from the service at the end of 1851.

== Peruvian journeys ==
=== First journey, 1852–1853 ===
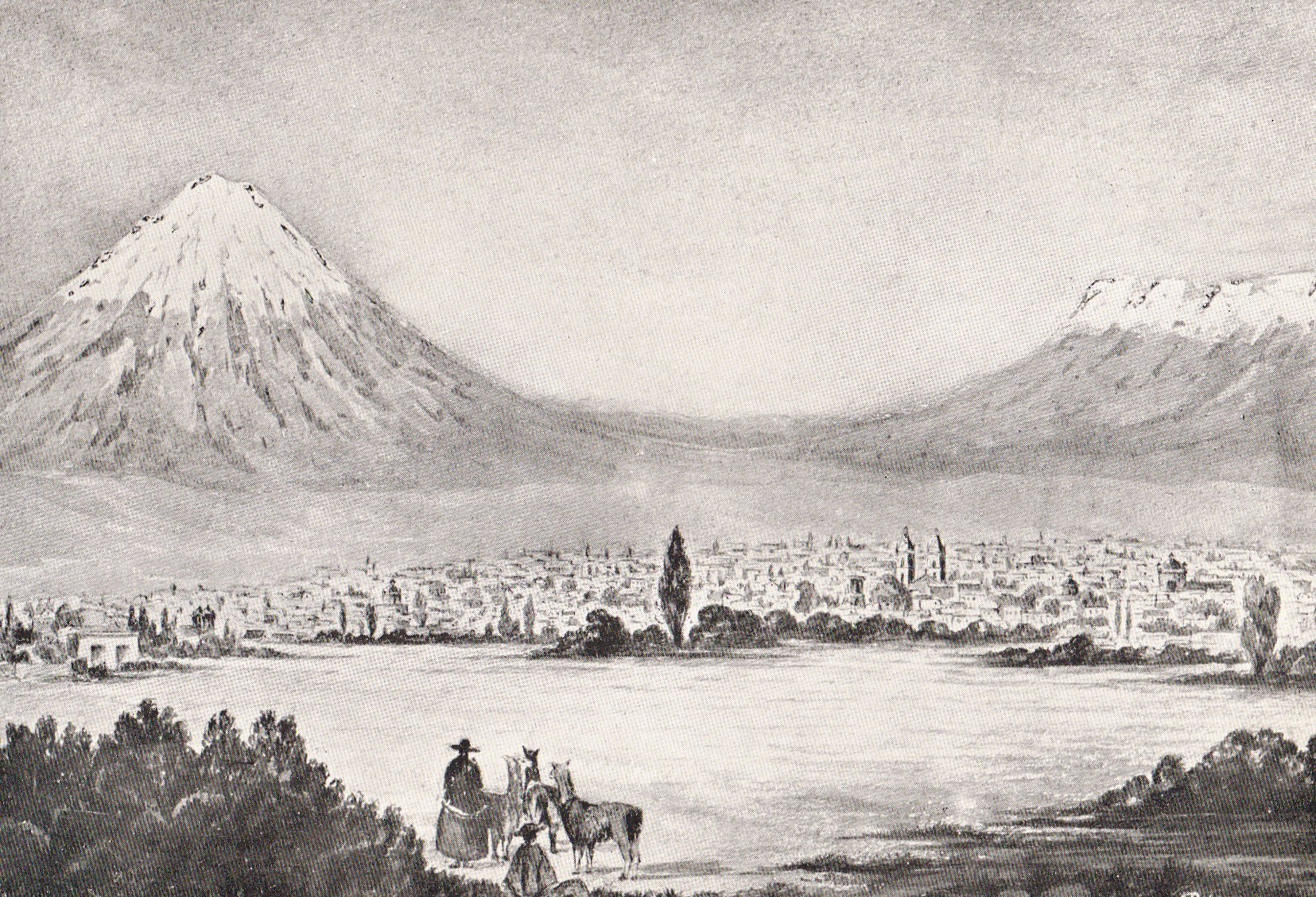
Old print of Arequipa, Peru, with Mount Misti in the background

In the summer of 1852, freed from his naval obligations, Markham made plans for an extended visit to Peru. Supported by a gift from his father of £500 (more than £40,000 at 2008 values) to cover expenses, Markham sailed from Liverpool on 20 August.

Markham travelled by a roundabout route, proceeding first to Halifax, Nova Scotia, then overland to Boston and New York, before taking a steamer to Panama. After crossing the isthmus of Panama, he sailed for Callao, finally arriving there on 16 October. He set out for the Peruvian interior on 7 December 1852, heading across the Andes towards his goal, the ancient Inca city of Cuzco. On the way, Markham paused for nearly a month in the town of Ayacucho, to study the local culture and increase his knowledge of the Quechua people. He then travelled on towards Cuzco, and after crossing a swinging bridge—the Apurimac Bridge—suspended 300 feet (91 m) above the raging Apurímac River, he and his party passed through fertile valleys which brought them finally to the city of Cuzco, on 20 March 1853.

Markham remained in the city for several weeks, researching Inca history, describing in his journal the many buildings and ruins that he visited. During the course of an excursion to nearby towns and ruins he reached the area of San Miguel, La Mar, Ayacucho, where he first learned of the properties of the cinchona plant, a source of quinine, cultivated in that vicinity. He finally left Cuzco on 18 May, accompanied by a party of six who, like him, were returning to Lima. Their journey took them southwards, descending the mountains to the city of Arequipa, a former Spanish colonial settlement with a mixture of native and European architecture. The city is overlooked by the conical volcano Mount Misti, which Markham likened to Mount Fuji in Japan. On 23 June, the party reached Lima, where Markham learned of the death of his father. He departed for England, where he arrived on 17 September.

=== Cinchona mission, 1859–1861 ===
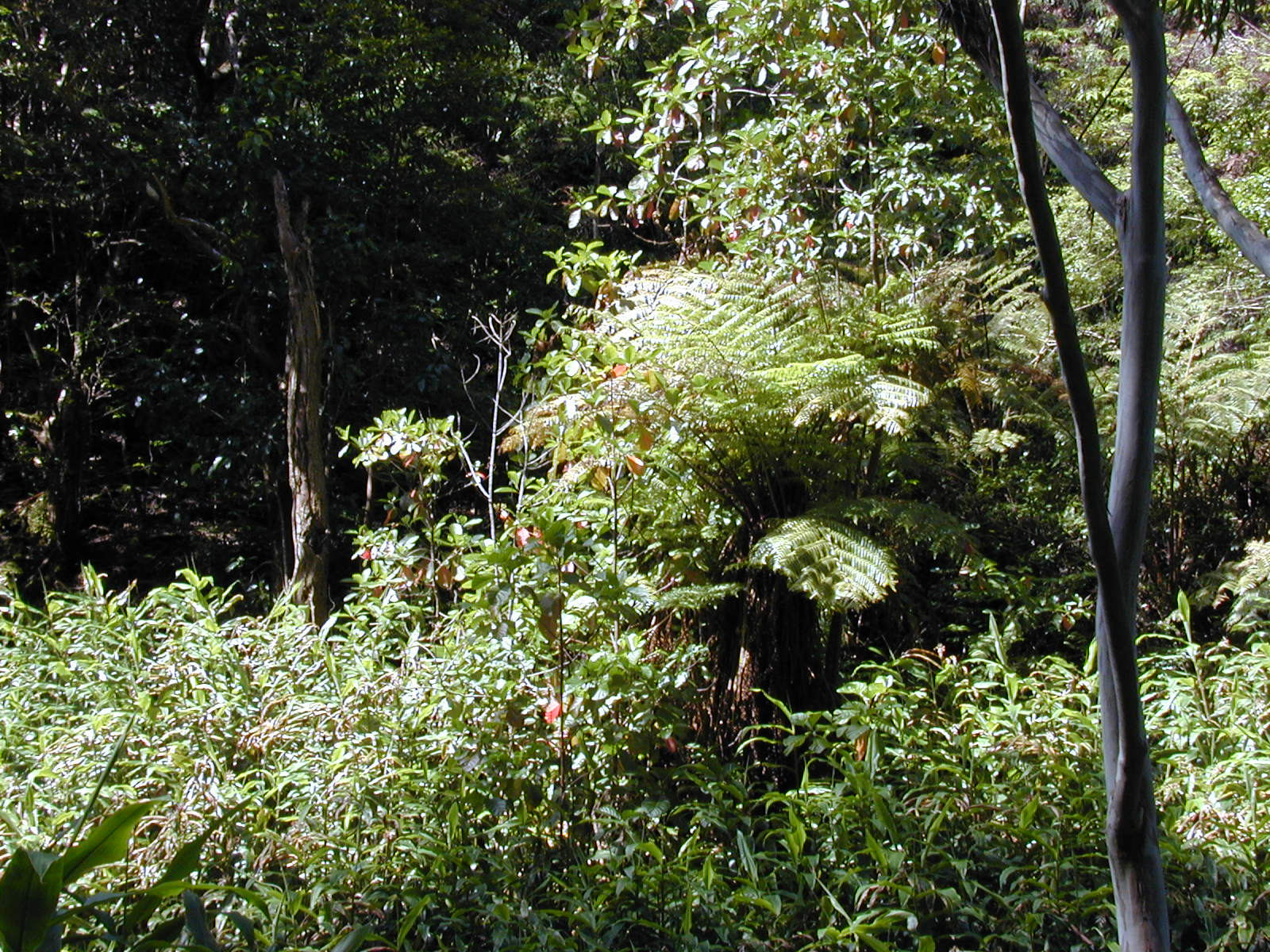
Cinchona plant (photographed in 2002 at a Hawaiian plantation)

The idea of introducing cinchona to India was first made in 1813, by W. Ainslie, and, years later, in 1839, John Forbes Royle suggested that it could be tried in the Nilgiris. The Indian government was spending £7000 a year around 1852 when Royle made a proposal to introduce cinchona to India. By coincidence Markham was a civil servant in the India Office, and in 1859 he made proposals to his employers for a scheme for collecting cinchona trees from the Peruvian and Bolivian Andes, and transplanting them to selected sites in India. Cinchona bark, a source of quinine, was the first known treatment for malaria and other tropical diseases. These plans were approved and Markham was placed in charge of the operation.

Markham and his team, which included the botanist Richard Spruce and his future brother-in-law, the New Zealander Charles Bowen, left England for Peru in December 1859, arriving in Lima late in January 1860. There was danger in their enterprise; Peru and Bolivia were on the verge of war, and Markham's party soon experienced the hostility of Peruvian interests anxious to protect their control over the cinchona trade. This limited his sphere of operations, and prevented him from obtaining specimens of the best quality. Later Markham overcame bureaucratic obstruction to obtain the necessary export licences.

Markham returned briefly to England before sailing to India, to select suitable sites for cinchona plantations there and in Burma (now Myanmar) and Ceylon. Although many of the Indian plantations failed to flourish and were soon destroyed by insects, others survived, and were augmented by species obtained by Spruce which were more suited to Indian conditions. Twenty years after the first plantations the annual cinchona bark crop from India was estimated at 490,000 pounds (220,000 kg). For his work in introducing cinchona to India, Markham received a grant of £3,000 (over £200,000 in 2008 terms) from the British Government.

== Civil servant, geographer, traveller ==
=== India Office, 1857–1867 ===
After the death of his father in 1853 Markham needed paid employment, and in December 1853 secured a junior clerkship in the Legacy Duty Office of the Inland Revenue at a salary of £90 per annum (around £6,000 in 2008). He found the work tedious, but after six months was able to transfer to the forerunner of what became, in 1857, the India Office. Here, the work was interesting and rewarding, with sufficient time to allow him to travel and pursue his geographical interests.

In April 1857, Markham married Minna Chichester, who accompanied him on the cinchona mission to Peru and India. Their only child, a daughter Mary Louise (known as May), was born in 1859. As part of his India Office duties Markham investigated and reported to the Indian government on the introduction of Peruvian cotton into the Madras Presidency, on the growth of ipecacuanha in Brazil and the possibilities for cultivating this medicinal plant in India, and on the future of the pearl industry at Tirunelveli in Southern India. He was also involved in an ambitious plan for the transplanting of Brazilian rubber trees, claiming that he would "do for the india-rubber or caoutchouc-yielding trees what had already been done with such happy results for the cinchona trees." This scheme was not, however, successful.

=== Abyssinia, 1867–1868 ===
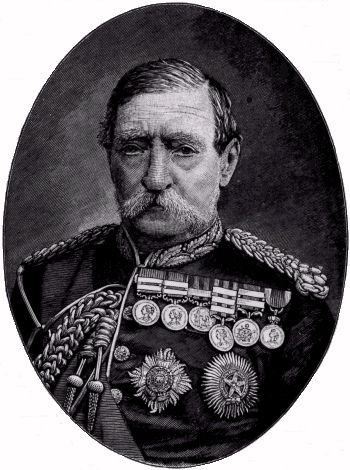
Sir Robert Napier, Abyssinian campaign commander

In 1867, Markham was selected to accompany Sir Robert Napier's military expeditionary force to Abyssinia, as the expedition's geographer. This force was despatched by the British government as a response to actions taken by the Abyssinian King Theodore. In 1862, the king had written to the British government requesting help to modernise his nation, and proposing the appointment of an ambassador, which the British had previously suggested. Unwilling to risk its monopoly of cotton in Egypt, the British government did not reply. The king reacted to this slight and other snubs by seizing and imprisoning the British consul and his staff, and ordered the arrest and whipping of a missionary who had insulted the king's mother. A belated reply to the king's letter resulted in the capture and incarceration of the deputation that brought it. After efforts at conciliation failed, the British decided to settle the matter by sending a military expedition. Because the geography of the country was so little known, it was decided that an experienced traveller with map-making skills should accompany the force, hence Markham's appointment.

Napier's troops arrived at Annesley Bay in the Red Sea, early in 1868. Markham was attached to the force's headquarters staff, with responsibility for general survey work and in particular the selection of the route to Magdala, the king's mountain stronghold. Markham also acted as the party's naturalist, reporting on the species of wildlife encountered during the 400-mile (640 km) march southward from the coast. He accompanied Napier to the walls of Magdala, which was stormed on 10 April 1868. As the king's forces charged down the mountain to meet Napier's advancing troops Markham recorded: "The Snider–Enfield rifles kept up a fire no Abyssinian troops could stand. They were mown down in lines ... the most heroic struggle could do nothing in the face of such vast inequality of arms." Markham added that although the king's misdeeds had been numerous and his cruelties horrible, he had finally died as a hero.

On the orders of General Napier, Magdala was burnt to the ground, its native and foreign guns destroyed and the accumulated treasures in the fortress looted. The British troops then departed, and Markham was back in England in July 1868. For his services to this campaign Markham was appointed Companion of the Order of the Bath in 1871.

=== Second Arctic voyage, 1875–1876 ===
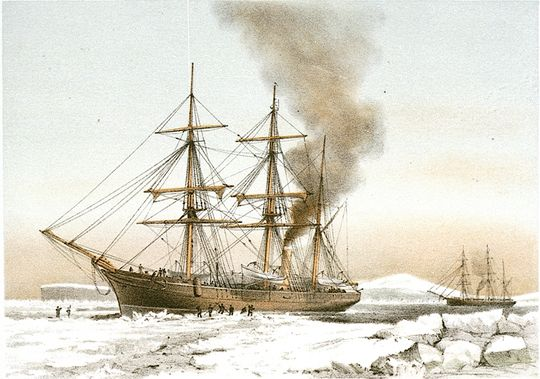
Discovery and Alert in the Arctic; both ships had auxiliary steam engines

Markham had, through his various activities, come to know many influential people, and during the early 1870s used these connections to make the case for a Royal Naval Arctic expedition. Prime minister Benjamin Disraeli consented, in the "spirit of maritime enterprise that has ever distinguished the English people". When the expedition was ready to sail, Markham was invited to accompany it as far as Greenland, on HMS Alert, one of the expedition's three ships. Markham accepted, and left with the convoy on 29 March 1875. He was gone for three months, remaining with Alert as far as Disko Island in Baffin Bay.

He wrote of this journey: "I never had a happier cruise ... a nobler set of fellows never sailed together." He returned to England on the support vessel HMS Valorous, although the homeward voyage was delayed after Valorous struck a reef and required substantial repairs. Markham's extended absence from his India Office duties, together with his increasing involvement in a range of other interests, caused his superiors to request his resignation. Markham retired from his post in 1877, his 22 years of service entitling him to a pension.

Meanwhile, the main expedition, under the command of Captain George Nares, had proceeded north with the two ships HMS Discovery and HMS Alert. On 1 September 1875, they reached 82° 24', the highest northern latitude reached by any ship up to that date. In the following spring a sledging party led by Markham's cousin, Commander Albert Hastings Markham, achieved a record Farthest North at 83° 20'.

== Royal Geographical Society ==
=== Honorary secretary, 1863–1888 ===
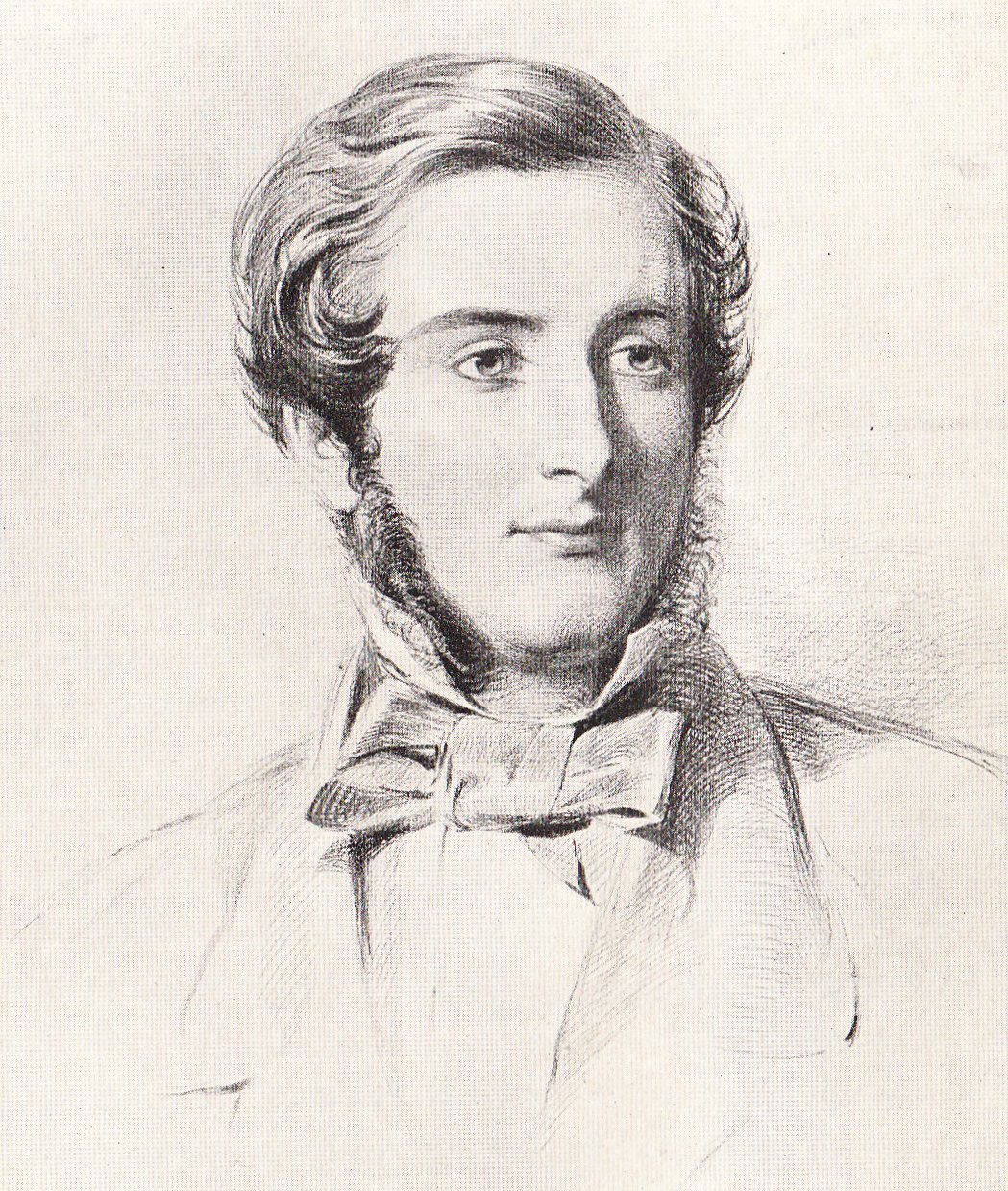
Clements Markham at the time of his election to the Royal Geographical Society

In November 1854, Markham had been elected a Fellow of the Royal Geographical Society. The Society soon became the centre of his geographical interests, and in 1863 he was appointed its honorary secretary, a position he was to hold for 25 years.

In addition to his work in promoting the Nares Arctic expedition, Markham followed the work of other Arctic explorers, organising a reception in 1880, for the Swedish explorer Adolf Erik Nordenskiöld after the latter's successful navigation of the North-East Passage, and monitoring the progress of the American expeditions of Adolphus Greely and George W. DeLong. Release from the India Office provided Markham with more time for travel. He made regular trips to Europe, and in 1885, went to America, where he met with President Grover Cleveland in the White House. Throughout his secretaryship Markham was a prolific writer of travel books and biographies, and of many papers presented to the RGS and elsewhere.

He was the author of the Encyclopædia Britannica (ninth edition) article entitled "Progress of Geographical Discovery". He also wrote popular histories. Within the RGS Markham was responsible for the revision of the Society's standard Hints to Travellers, and for relaunching the journal Proceedings of the Royal Geographical Society in a much livelier format. Markham conducted the Geographical Magazine from 1872 to 1878, when it became merged in the Proceedings of the Royal Geographical Society.

In parallel with his RGS duties Markham served as secretary of the Hakluyt Society until 1886, subsequently becoming that society's president. As part of his work for this body, Markham was responsible for many translations from Spanish into English of rare accounts of travel, in particular those relating to Peru. In time scholars would express doubts about the quality of some of these translations, finding them prepared in haste and lacking in rigour. Nevertheless, this work ran to 22 volumes in the society's publications. In 1873, Markham had been elected a Fellow of the Royal Society, and in subsequent years received several overseas honours, including the Portuguese Order of Christ and the Order of the Rose of Brazil. He briefly considered, but did not pursue, the idea of a parliamentary career.

Markham maintained his interest in the navy, particularly in the training of its officers. He often visited the merchant officer training vessels, HMS Conway and HMS Worcester, and became a member of the latter's governing body. In early 1887 he accepted an invitation from his cousin Albert Markham, who now commanded the Royal Navy's training squadron, to join the squadron at its station in the West Indies. Markham spent three months aboard the flagship HMS Active, during which, on 1 March 1887, he had his first encounter with Robert Falcon Scott, who was serving as a midshipman aboard HMS Rover. Scott was victorious in a race between cutters, an event that was noted and remembered by Markham.

=== President, 1893–1905 ===
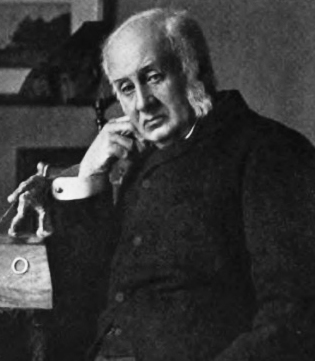
Markham as President of the Royal Geographical Society

In May 1888, Markham resigned from his position as RGS Secretary, finding himself at odds with the Society's new policies which appeared to favour education over exploration. On his retirement he was awarded the Society's Founder's Medal for what were described at the presentation ceremony as his "incomparable services to the Society".

The next few years were filled with travel and writing. There were further cruises with the training squadron, and extended visits to the Baltic and the Mediterranean. In 1893, during the course of one of these journeys, Markham was elected in absentia president of the society. This unexpected elevation was the result of a dispute within the Society over the question of women members, about which Markham had kept silent. When in July 1893, the issue was put to a special general meeting, the proposal to admit women was narrowly defeated despite an overwhelming postal ballot in favour. In these circumstances the Society's President, Sir M. E. Grant Duff, resigned his office. The 22 existing women members were allowed to remain, but no more were admitted until January 1913 when the RGS changed its policy.

Although Markham was not the first choice as a replacement for Grant Duff—other notable figures were approached—he had kept out of the women members controversy and was broadly acceptable to the membership. Shortly after his accession to the presidency, in recognition of his services to geography Markham was promoted Knight Commander of the Order of the Bath, and became Sir Clements Markham.

In a letter written many years later, Markham said that on the assumption of the presidency he had felt the need, after the dispute over women, to "restore the Society's good name" by the adoption of some great enterprise. He chose Antarctic exploration as the basis for this mission; there had been no significant Antarctic exploration by any country since Sir James Clark Ross's expedition fifty years previously. A new impetus was provided through a lecture given to the RGS in 1893, by the oceanographer John Murray, calling for "an expedition to resolve the outstanding questions still posed in the south." In response to Murray the RGS and the Royal Society formed a joint committee, to campaign for a British Antarctic expedition.

=== National Antarctic Expedition, 1895–1904 ===
Murray's call for the resumption of Antarctic exploration was taken up again two years later, when the RGS acted as host to the sixth International Geographical Congress in August 1895. This Congress passed a unanimous resolution:

[That] the exploration of the Antarctic Regions is the greatest piece of geographical exploration still to be undertaken. That, in view of the additions to knowledge in almost every branch of science which would result from such a scientific exploration, the Congress recommends that the scientific societies throughout the world should urge, in whatever way seems to them most effective, that this work should be undertaken before the close of the century.

The joint committee organising the British response to this resolution contained a difference of view. Murray and the Royal Society argued for a largely civilian expedition, directed and staffed by scientists, while Markham and most of the RGS contingent saw a National Antarctic Expedition as a means of reviving naval glories, and wanted the expedition organised accordingly. Markham's tenacity finally won the day when in 1900 he secured the appointment of his protégé Robert Falcon Scott, by then a torpedo lieutenant on HMS Majestic, as the expedition's overall commander. In doing so he thwarted an attempt to place the leadership in the hands of Professor John Walter Gregory of the British Museum.

In the view of Markham's critics, this represented the subordination of scientific work to naval adventure, although the "Instructions to the Commander", drawn up by Markham, give equal priorities to geographical and scientific work. The "science versus adventure" arguments were renewed when, after the return of the expedition, there was criticism over the accuracy and professionalism of some of its scientific results.

Discovery moored in 1902

Markham faced further problems in securing funding for the expedition. In 1898, after three years' effort, only a fraction of what was required had been promised. Meanwhile, the Anglo-Norwegian explorer Carsten Borchgrevink had obtained a sum of £40,000 (over £3 million in 2008) from publisher George Newnes, to finance a private Antarctic venture. Markham was furious, believing that funds were being diverted from his own project, and denounced Borchgrevink as "evasive, a liar and a fraud".

He was equally hostile to William Speirs Bruce, the Scottish explorer who had written to Markham asking to join the National Antarctic Expedition. On receiving no confirmation of an appointment, Bruce obtained finance from the Scottish Coats baronets family and organised his own Scottish National Antarctic Expedition. Markham accused Bruce of "mischievous rivalry", and of attempting to "cripple the National Expedition ... in order to get up a scheme for yourself". The Scottish expedition duly sailed, but Markham remained unforgiving towards it, and used his influence to ensure that its participants received no Polar Medals on their return.

A substantial private donation and a government grant finally allowed the National Antarctic Expedition to proceed. A new ship, the Discovery, was built, and a mainly naval crew of officers and crewmen appointed, along with a scientific staff which was later described as "underpowered". Discovery sailed on 5 August 1901, after an inspection by King Edward VII, at which Markham was present to introduce Scott and the officers. The ship was gone for just over three years during which time, from a base in the Ross Sea area, significant explorations of this sector of Antarctica were carried out, along with an extensive scientific programme. Although it was reported by the Times as "one of the most successful [expeditions] that ever ventured into the Polar regions, north or south," it was largely ignored by the government of the day. Markham was criticised in official quarters for privately sanctioning a second season in the Antarctic, contrary to the original plan, and then being unable to raise funds for the expedition's relief in 1904. The cost for this had to be borne on His Majesty's Treasury.

== Later life ==
=== Shackleton and Scott ===
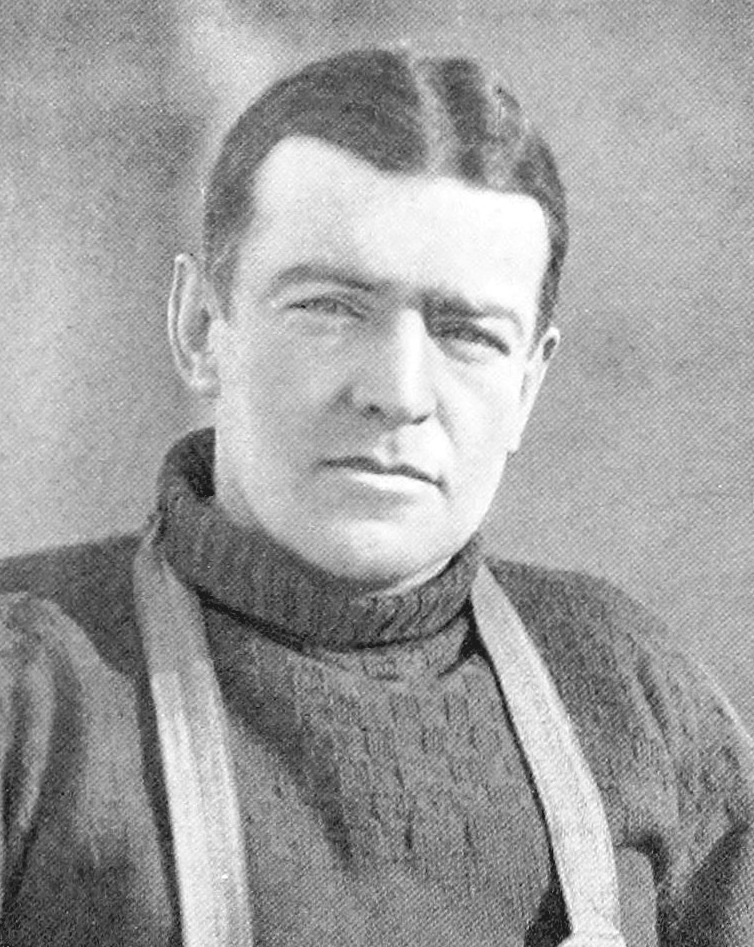
Markham initially supported—but later turned against—Ernest Shackleton

A few months after the Discovery's return, Markham announced his retirement from the RGS presidency. He was 75 years old; according to his biographer he felt that his active geographical life was now over. His 12 years in the presidency was the longest period on record. He remained a member of the RGS Council, a vice-president, and he kept an active interest in Antarctic exploration, particularly in the two British expeditions which set out in the five years following his retirement. These were led respectively by Ernest Shackleton and Scott.

Markham had agreed to Shackleton's appointment as third officer on the Discovery following a recommendation from the expedition's principal private donor. He had given sympathy and support after Shackleton's early return from the expedition on grounds of ill health, and had backed the latter's unsuccessful application for a Royal Navy commission. Later, after Shackleton had confided his intention to lead an expedition of his own, Markham supplied a generous testimonial, describing Shackleton as "well-fitted to have charge of men in an enterprise involving hardship and peril", and "admirably fitted for the leader[ship] of a Polar Expedition."

He expressed strong support for Shackleton's 1907–1909 Nimrod expedition: "... not only my most cordial wishes for your success will accompany you, but also a well-founded hope." When news of the expedition's achievement of a new Farthest South latitude of 88°23' reached him, Markham publicly signified his intention to propose Shackleton for the RGS Patron's Medal.

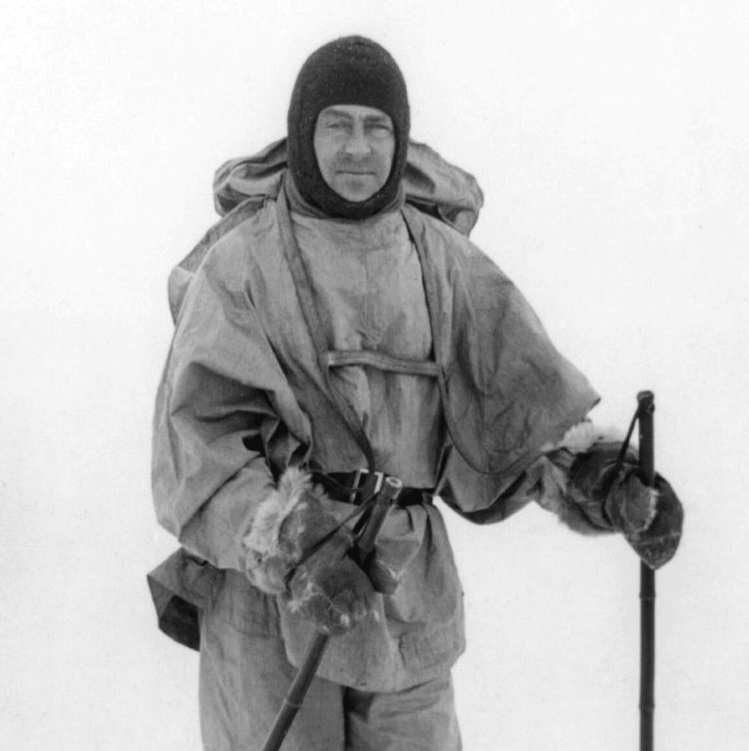
Robert Falcon Scott, who remained Markham's protégé throughout his polar career

However, Markham had second thoughts, and was soon writing to the current RGS president, Leonard Darwin, to express disbelief about Shackleton's claimed latitudes, repeating these doubts to Scott. Historians have surmised that Scott was Markham's protégé, and that the old man resented polar glory going to someone else. Whatever his reason, Markham adopted a bitterness towards Shackleton which he retained for the rest of his life. He is said to have crossed out all favourable references to Shackleton in his own notes on the Discovery expedition, and to have virtually ignored Shackleton's achievements in a 1912 address to the British Association. He was equally dismissive in his history of Antarctic exploration, The Lands of Silence, published posthumously in 1921.

By contrast, Markham remained on close personal terms with Scott and was godfather to the explorer's son, born 14 September 1909 and named Peter Markham Scott in the old man's honour. In his tribute to Scott in the preface to Scott's Last Expedition (1913), Markham describes Scott as "among the most remarkable men of our time", and talks of the "beauty" of his character. As Scott lay dying "there was no thought for himself, only the earnest thought to give comfort and consolation to others." In one of the last letters written from his final camp, days from death, Scott wrote: "Tell Sir Clements I thought much of him, and never regretted his putting me in command of the 'Discovery'."

=== Retirement ===
Markham in old age. Originally painted by George Henry in 1913 and of which a photogravure was made by Emery Walker. It includes a statuette of a polar explorer on the table and a painting of a cinchona plant on the wall.

After his retirement from the RGS presidency, Markham led an active life as a writer and traveller. He wrote biographies of the English kings Edward IV and Richard III, and of his old naval friend Admiral Sir Leopold McClintock; he also kept up his editing and translating work. He continued to produce papers for the RGS, and remained president of the Hakluyt Society until 1910. Markham continued to travel extensively in Europe, and in 1906 cruised with the Mediterranean squadron, where Scott was acting as flag captain to Rear Admiral George Egerton. When, in 1909, Scott announced his plans for a new Antarctic venture, the Terra Nova expedition, Markham assisted with fundraising and served on the expedition's organising committee, arranging the deal which brought in Lieutenant "Teddy" Evans as second-in-command, in return for the abandonment of Evans's own expedition plans.

Markham was awarded honorary degrees from the University of Cambridge and University of Leeds. In conferring this latter degree, the Chancellor referred to Markham as "a veteran in the service of mankind", and recalled that he had been "for sixty years the inspiration of English geographical science." However, Markham did not altogether avoid controversy. In 1912, when Roald Amundsen, conqueror of the South Pole, was invited by RGS president Leonard Darwin to dine with the Society, Markham resigned his council seat in protest.

The news of the death of Scott and his returning polar party reached Markham in February 1913, while he was staying in Estoril. He returned to England, and assisted with the preparation of Scott's journals for publication. Scott's death was a heavy blow, but Markham continued to lead a busy life of writing and travelling. In 1915, he was present at the service in St Peter's Church, Binton, near Stratford-upon-Avon, where a window was dedicated to Scott and his companions; later that year he assisted at the unveiling of the Royal Navy's statue of Scott, in Waterloo Place, London. Markham read his last paper for the RGS on 10 June 1915, its title being "The History of the Gradual Development of the Groundwork of Geographical Science".

== Death and legacy ==
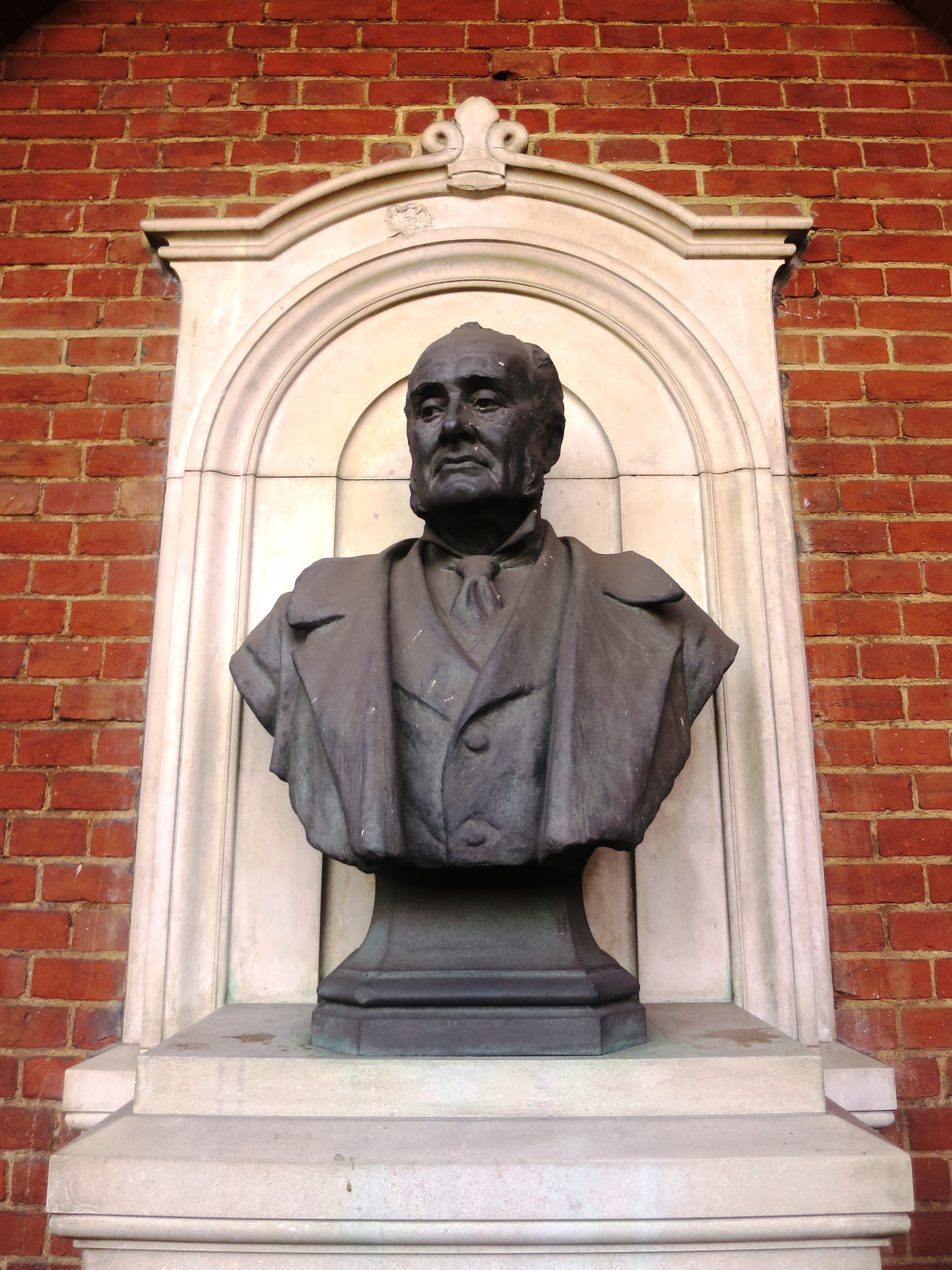
Bust of Markham by F. W. Pomeroy

On 29 January 1916, while reading in bed by candlelight, Markham set fire to the bedclothes and was overcome by smoke. He died the following day. His last diary entry, a few days earlier, had recorded a visit from Peter Markham Scott.

The family received tributes from King George V, who acknowledged the debt the country owed to Markham's life work of study and research; from the Royal Geographical Society and the other learned bodies with which Markham had been associated; from the Naval Commander-in-Chief at Devonport; and from Fridtjof Nansen, the Norwegian Arctic explorer. Other messages were received from France, Italy, Denmark, Sweden, the United States, and from Arequipa in Peru.

More critical assessments of Markham's life and work were to follow. Hugh Robert Mill, Shackleton's first biographer and for many years the RGS librarian, referred to the dictatorial manner in which Markham had run the Society. In time, questions would be raised about the accuracy of some of his Hakluyt translations, and about the evidence of haste in the preparation of other publications. On a personal level he had made enemies as well as friends; Frank Debenham, the geologist who served with both Scott and Shackleton, called Markham "a dangerous old man", while William Speirs Bruce wrote of Markham's "malicious opposition to the Scottish National Antarctic Expedition".

Bruce's colleague Robert Rudmose-Brown went further, calling Markham "that old fool and humbug". These protestations reflected Markham's protective attitude towards Scott; according to Bruce, "Scott was Markham's protégé, and Markham thought it necessary, in order to uphold Scott, that I should be obliterated". He added that "Scott and I were always good friends, in spite of Markham." Markham's writings on naval history have been criticised by modern scholars due to his nationalistic exaggeration of English sailors' achievements in the Age of Discoveries.

It has been suggested that Markham's prejudices about polar travel, particularly his belief in the "nobility" of manhauling, had been passed to Scott, to the detriment of all future British expeditions. Mill's measured opinion, that Markham was "an enthusiast rather than a scholar", has been asserted as a fair summary of his strengths and weaknesses, and as the basis for his influence on the discipline of geography in the late-19th and early-20th centuries. He is commemorated by Mount Markham, 82°51′S 161°21′E, in the Transantarctic range, discovered and named by Scott on his southern march during the Discovery expedition in 1902.

The Markham River in Papua New Guinea was named after him; Carsten Borchgrevink discovered and named Markham Island in the Ross Sea during his 1900 expedition, a gesture that was not, however, acknowledged by Markham. The name lives on in Lima, Peru, through Markham College, a private co-educational school. Minna Bluff, a promontory extending into the Ross Ice Shelf, was named by Scott for Lady Markham. The plant genus Markhamia was named after Markham by the German botanist Berthold Carl Seemann in 1863.

Markham's estate was valued for probate purposes at £7,740 (2008 equivalent £376,000). He was survived by his wife Minna, to whom Albert Hastings Markham's 1917 biography of Sir Clements is dedicated. Markham's only child, May, avoided public life and devoted herself to church work in the East End of London. According to the family's entry in Burke's Landed Gentry she died in 1926.

== Portrayal in media ==
Markham was portrayed by the character actor Geoffrey Chater in the BBC TV miniseries Shackleton in 1983, and by Alexander Knox in the Central Television serial The Last Place on Earth in 1985.

== Writings ==
Markham was a prolific writer and diarist; his first published work, an account of his voyage with HMS Assistance in search of Franklin, had appeared in 1853. After his retirement from the India office in 1877, writing became his chief source of income. In addition to papers and reports for the Royal Geographical Society and other learned bodies, Markham wrote histories, biographies and travel accounts, many as full-length books. He also translated many works from Spanish to English, and compiled a grammar and dictionary for the Quichua language of Peru.

His books include the following:

- Franklin's Footsteps (1852) London, Chapman and Hall
- Cuzco ... and Lima (1856) London, Chapman and Hall
- Travels in Peru and India (1862) London, John Murray
- Contribution Toward a Grammar and Dictionary of Quichua (1864) London, Trubner & Co,
- A History of the Abyssinian Expedition (1869) London, Macmillan
- A Life of the Great Lord Fairfax (1870) London, Macmillan
- Ollanta: An Ancient Ynca Drama (1871) London, Trubner & Co
- A Memoir of the Lady Ana de Osorio, Countess of Chinchon and Vice-Queen of Peru (A. D. 1629–39) with a Plea for the Correct Spelling of the Chinchona Genus (1874) London, Trubner & Co
- General Sketch of the History of Persia (1874) London, Longman Green
- The Threshold of the Unknown Regions(1875) London, Samson Low
- Narrative of the Mission of George Bogle to Tibet (1877) London, Trubner & Co
- A Memoir of the Indian Surveys (1878) London, W.H. Allen
- Peruvian Bark (1880) London, John Murray
- The Voyages of William Baffin, 1612–1622 (1881) London, Hakluyt Society
- The War between Peru and Chile, 1879–1882 (1882) London, Samson Low
- A Narrative of the Life of Admiral John Markham (1883) London, Low Marston Searle & Rivington
- The Sea Fathers (1885) London, Cassell
- Life of Robert Fairfax of Steeton, Vice-admiral (1885) London, MacMillan & Co,
- The Fighting Veres (1888) London, Samson Low
- The Life of John Davis the Navigator (1889) London, George Philip and Son
- The Life of Christopher Columbus (1892) London, George Philip and Son
- The History of Peru (1892) Chicago, Charles H Sergel
- Major James Rennel and the Rise of Modern English Geography (1895) London, Cassell & Co
- The Paladins of Edwin the Great (1896) London, Adam & Charles Black
- Richard III: His Life and Character (1906) London, Smith, Elder & Co
- The Story of Minorca and Majorca (1909) London, Smith, Elder & Co
- The Incas of Peru (1912) London, John Murray
- The Conquest of New Granada (1912, reprint 1971)
- The Lands of Silence (completed by F.H.H. Guillemard, 1921) Cambridge, Cambridge University Press
