= Victoria-class ship of the line =

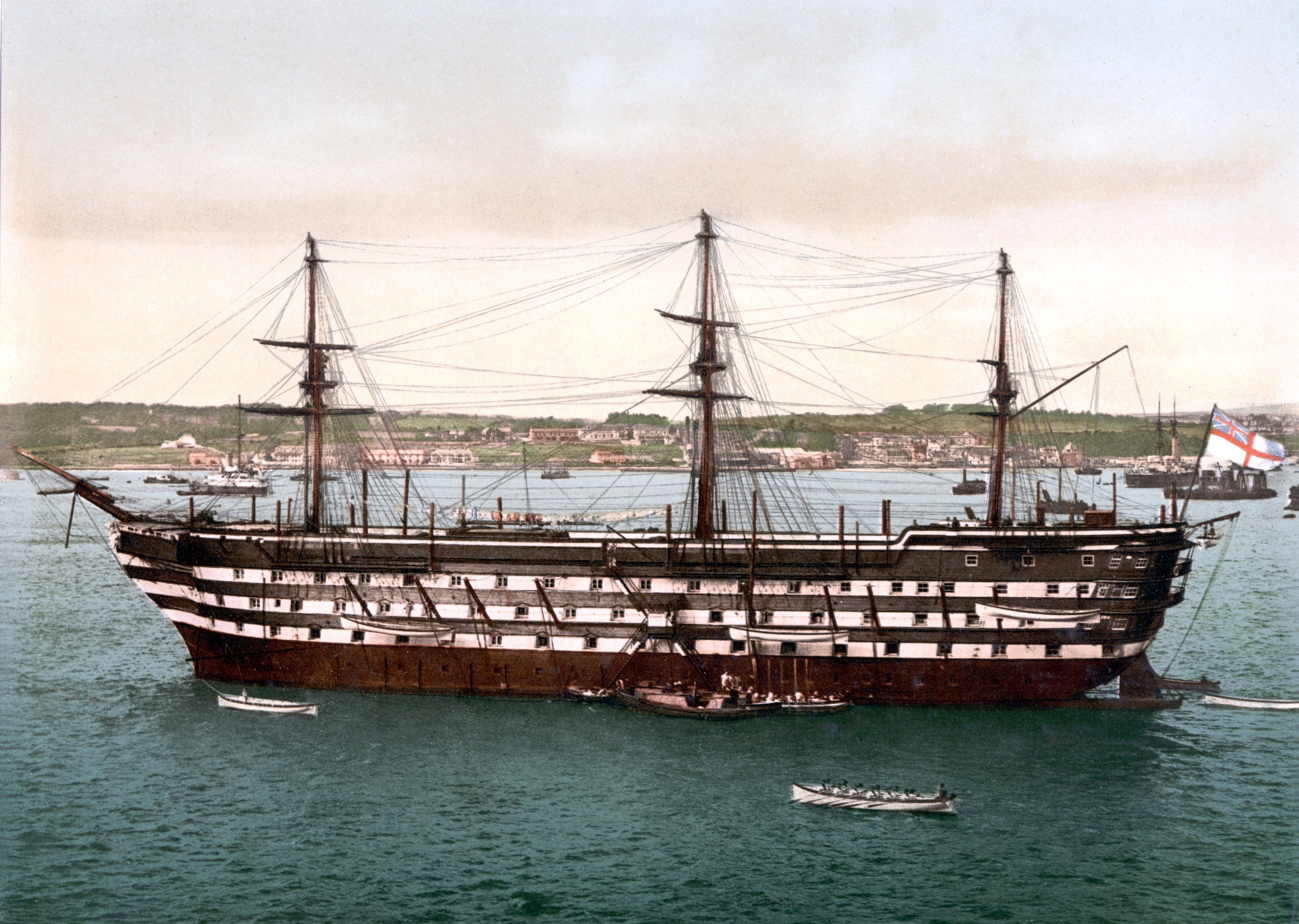
- The former Howe as the school ship Impregnable in the 1890s

Class overview
- Name: Victoria
- Operators: Royal Navy
- Preceded by: Windsor Castle
- Succeeded by: None
- Built: 1856–1860
- In service: 2 November 1864–1919
- Completed: 2
- Scrapped: 2

General characteristics
- Class & type: Victoria-class ship of the line
- Displacement: 6,959 long tons (7,071 t)
- Tons burthen: 4,126 71/94 bm
- Length: 260 ft (79.2 m)
- Beam: 60 ft 1 in (18.3 m)
- Draught: 21 ft 2 in (6.5 m) (light)
- Depth of hold: 26 ft 10 in (8.2 m)
- Installed power: 8 fire-tube boilers; 4,403 ihp (3,283 kW; 4,464 PS)
- Propulsion: 1 propeller shaft; 1 steam engine
- Sail plan: Full-rigged ship
- Speed: 11.8 knots (21.9 km/h; 13.6 mph)
- Complement: 1,000 officers and ratings
- Armament: Lower gun deck: 32 × 8 in (203 mm) shell guns; Middle gun deck: 30 × 8 in guns; Upper gun deck: 32 × 32 pdr guns; Quarter deck: 26 × 32 pdr guns, 1 × 68 pdr gun

The Victoria class consisted of a pair of 121-gun, first-rate ships of the line built for the Royal Navy during the 1850s, Victoria, and Howe. The ships spent the bulk of their careers in ordinary or on secondary duties like stationary flagships for various administrative positions or as training ships, although Victoria spent three years in the 1860s as the flagship of the Mediterranean Fleet.

== Background and description ==
The Victoria-class ships were authorised by the Admiralty in 1855 in response to the French first rate, the 130-gun Bretagne, despite the alliance between France and Britain during the ongoing Crimean War. Both the First Lord of the Admiralty, Sir James Graham and the Surveyor of the Navy, Captain Baldwin Wake Walker, believed that "France would resume her role as Britain's principal rival at sea". The ships measured 260 feet (79.2 m) on the gun deck and 221 feet (67.4 m) on the keel. They had a beam of 60 feet (18.3 m), and a depth of hold of 25 feet 10 inches (7.87 m). The ships had a tonnage of 4,116 tons burthen and had an intended displaced of 6,959 long tons (7,071 t). The great size of the Victoria class required that their hulls be reinforced by thick diagonal wrought-iron straps. The ships were the only British three-deck ships of the line to be designed from the start for screw propulsion, and were the largest wooden battleships of their time.

The ships were powered by a two-cylinder, horizontal trunk steam engine that was rated at 1,000 nominal horsepower; it used steam from eight fire-tube boilers to drive the single propeller shaft. Howe's engine was built by John Penn and Sons and it produced 4,564 indicated horsepower (3,403 kW; 4,627 PS) during her sea trials which gave her a maximum speed of 13.6 knots (25.2 km/h; 15.7 mph), albeit without masts or supplies. Victoria's engine was built by Maudslay, Sons and Field and it produced 4,403 ihp (3,283 kW; 4,464 PS) during the ship's sea trials which gave her a maximum speed of 11.8 knots (21.9 km/h; 13.6 mph). The Victoria-class ships were unique in the RN as the only steam battleships with boiler rooms fore and aft of the engine room. Each boiler room was fitted with a funnel that could be retracted to reduce drag when under sail. The ships had three masts and were ship rigged.

The armament of the ships consisted of thirty-two 8 in (203 mm) shell guns on their lower gun deck, thirty 8-inch shell guns on the middle gun deck and thirty-two 32-pounder (56 cwt) guns (Note: "Cwt" is the abbreviation for hundredweight, 56 cwt referring to the weight of the gun.) on their upper gun deck. Between their forecastle and quarterdeck, they carried twenty-six 32-pounder (42 cwt) guns and a single 68-pounder (95 cwt) on a pivot mount. Their crew numbered 1000 officers and ratings.

== Ships ==
While under construction in 1857–1858, Walker decided that the ships needed finer lines and ordered that their bows be extended by 15 feet (4.6 m) and the beam increased by 1 foot (0.3 m).

Construction data
Ship	Builder	Ordered	Laid down	Launched	Completed	Fate
Victoria	HM Dockyard, Portsmouth	3 April 1854	1 April 1856	12 November 1859	20 April 1860	Sold for scrap, 31 May 1893
Howe	HM Dockyard, Pembroke	3 April 1854	10 March 1856	7 March 1860	16 August 1860	Sold for scrap, 18 February 1921

== Service history ==
Although Victoria was completed in 1860, the ship was not commissioned until 1864 when she became the flagship of Britain's Mediterranean Fleet. She was paid off in 1867 into the reserve fleet and was later sold for scrap.

Howe never served on active duty during her lifetime. She spent her early career as the flagship of the Reserve Fleet before being renamed Bulwark in 1885. The ship was renamed a second time to Impregnable the following year and became a stationary boys training ship, while also serving as the flagship of the Commander-in-Chief, Plymouth, but briefly reverted to Bulwark in 1919 before being sold for scrap.
