= HMS Howe (1860) =

Ship of the line of the British Royal Navy

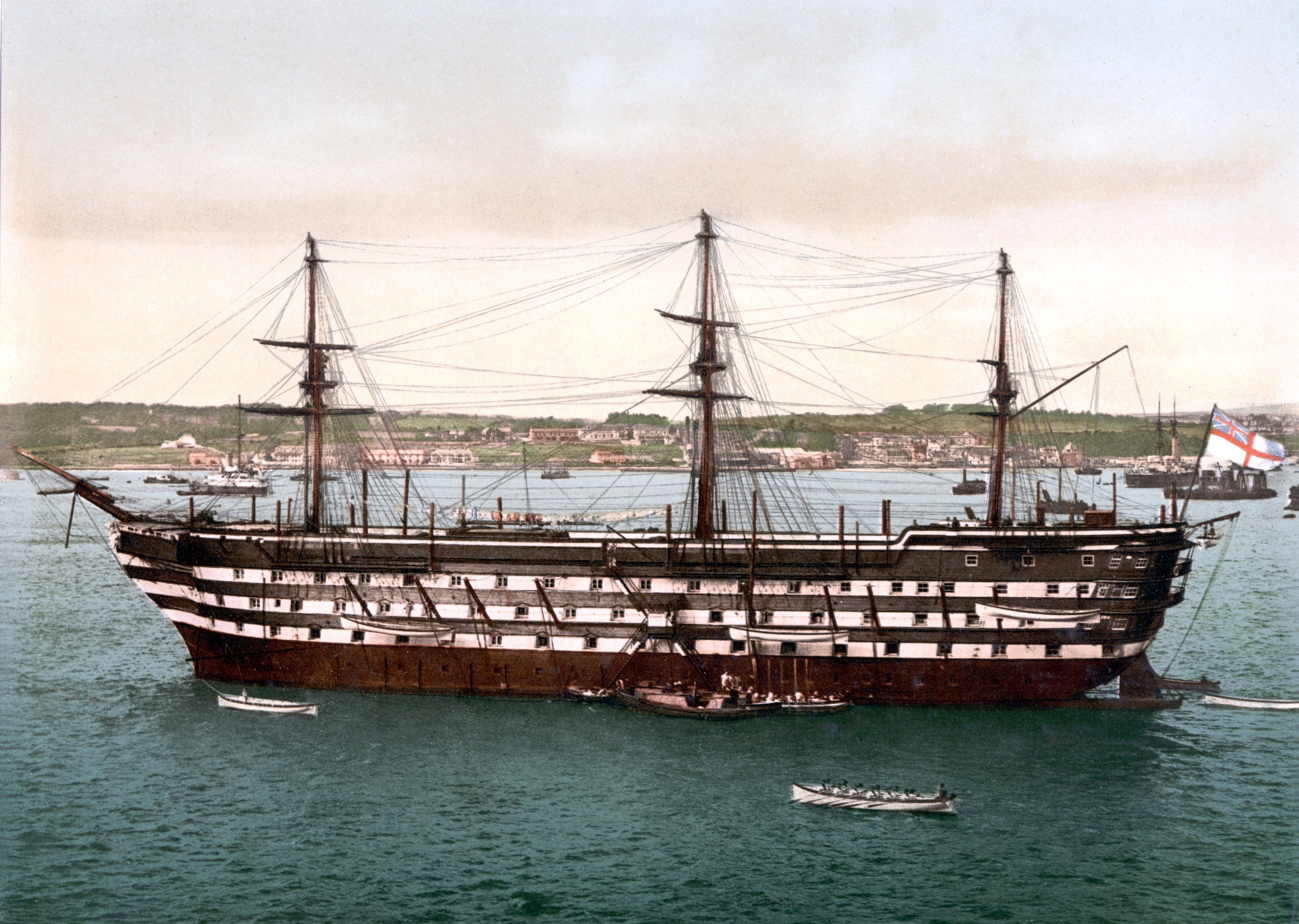
- The former HMS Howe as the school ship HMS Impregnable in the 1890s

History

Royal NavyUnited Kingdom
- Name: Howe
- Ordered: 3 April 1854
- Builder: HM Dockyard, Pembroke
- Laid down: 10 March 1856
- Launched: 7 March 1860
- Completed: 16 August 1860
- Commissioned: 3 May 1860
- Renamed: Bulwark, 3 December 1885; Impregnable, 27 September 1886; Bulwark, December 1919
- Fate: Sold for scrap, 18 February 1921

General characteristics
- Class & type: Victoria-class ship of the line
- Tons burthen: 4,245 31/94 bm
- Length: 260 ft (79.2 m) (o/a)
- Beam: 61 ft 1 in (18.6 m)
- Draught: 20 ft 9 in (6.3 m)
- Depth of hold: 26 ft 10 in (8.2 m)
- Installed power: 8 boilers; 4,564 ihp (3,403 kW; 4,627 PS)
- Propulsion: 1 propeller shaft; 1 trunk steam engine
- Sail plan: Full-rigged ship
- Speed: 13.6 knots (25.2 km/h; 15.7 mph)
- Complement: 1,000 officers and ratings
- Armament: Lower gun deck: 32 × 8 in (203 mm) shell guns; Middle gun deck: 30 × 8 in guns; Upper gun deck: 32 × 32 pdr guns; Quarter deck & Forecastle: 26 × 32 pdr guns, 1 × 68 pdr gun

HMS Howe was a 121-gun, screw first-rate Victoria-class ship of the line built for the Royal Navy (RN) during the 1850s. She and her sister HMS Victoria were the first and only British three-decker ships of the line to be designed from the start for screw propulsion. Howe never served on active duty during her lifetime. She spent her early career as the flagship of the Reserve fleet before being renamed Bulwark in 1885. The ship was renamed a second time to Impregnable the following year and became a training ship, but briefly reverted to Bulwark in 1919 before being sold for scrap in 1921.

== Description ==
Howe measured 260 feet (79.2 m) on the gundeck and 219 feet 10 inches (67.0 m) on the keel. She had a beam of 61 feet 1 inch (18.6 m), a maximum draught of 21 feet 2 inches (6.5 m), and a depth of hold of 26 feet 10 inches (8.18 m). The ship had a tonnage of 4,245 31/94 tons burthen. The great size of the Victoria class required that their hulls be reinforced by thick diagonal wrought-iron straps. The armament of the ships consisted of thirty-two 8 in (203 mm) shell guns on her lower gun deck, thirty 8-inch shell guns on the middle gun deck and thirty-two 32-pounder (56 cwt) guns (Note: "Cwt" is the abbreviation for hundredweight, 56 cwt referring to the weight of the gun.) on her upper gun deck. Between their forecastle and quarterdeck, they carried twenty-six 32-pounder (42 cwt) guns and a single 68-pounder (95 cwt) gun on a pivot mount. Their crew numbered 1000 officers and ratings.

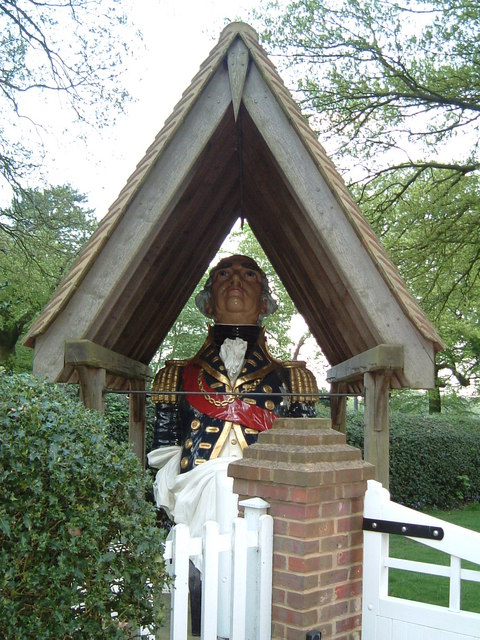
Howe's figurehead in Hunt's Green, Buckinghamshire

Howe was powered by a two-cylinder, horizontal trunk steam engine that was rated at 1000 nominal horsepower; it used steam from eight fire-tube boilers to drive the single propeller shaft. The ship's engine was built by John Penn and Sons and it produced 4,564 indicated horsepower (3,403 kW; 4,627 PS) during her sea trials on 1 June 1860 which gave her a maximum speed of 13.6 knots (25.2 km/h; 15.7 mph), albeit without masts or supplies. The Victoria-class ships were unique in the RN as the only steam battleships with boiler rooms fore and aft of the engine room. Each boiler room was fitted with a funnel that could be retracted to reduce drag when under sail.

== Construction and career ==
Howe was ordered on 3 April 1854 without a name and named after Richard Howe, 1st Earl Howe on 6 January 1855. She was the third ship of her name to serve in the RN. The ship was laid down on 10 March 1856 at HM Dockyard, Pembroke, and launched on 7 March 1860. She was commissioned by Captain Frederick Kerr on 3 May as the flagship of Vice-Admiral Houston Stewart, commander of the reserve fleet at Plymouth. Howe was completed on 16 August and was never served on active duty for her entire career.

The ship was renamed Bulwark on 3 December 1885 to release her name for a new ironclad battleship. She was renamed Impregnable on 27 September 1886 when she replaced the old second rate Impregnable as the boys' training ship in Devonport. Captain Robert Harris assumed command in September 1889. Captain Lionel Halsey was appointed to the ship in April 1908 as the flag captain for Admiral Sir Wilmot Fawkes, Commander-in-Chief, Plymouth. Impregnable continued to serve as the flagship for the C-in-C, Plymouth, through the tenures of Admirals William May and George Egerton.

She reverted to her previous name of Bulwark in December 1919 and was sold to J. B. Garnham for scrap on 18 February 1921. The ship's teak were used to rebuild the Liberty Store in the Tudor revivalist style in London. Her figurehead is preserved on the grounds of the old family home at Great Missenden in Buckinghamshire.

== Bibliography ==
- Colledge, J. J.; Warlow, Ben & Bush, Steve (2020). Ships of the Royal Navy: The Complete Record of all Fighting Ships of the Royal Navy from the 15th Century to the Present (5th revised and updated ed.). Seaforth Publishing. ISBN 978-1-5267-9327-0.
- Friedman, Norman (2018). British Battleships of the Victorian Era. Naval Institute Press. ISBN 978-1-68247-329-0.
- Lambert, Andrew D. (1984). Battleships in Transition: The Creation of the Steam Battlefleet 1815-1860. Conway Maritime Press. ISBN 0-85177-315-X.
- Manning, T. D. & Walker, C. F. (1959). British Warship Names. Putnam. OCLC 838607.
- Phillips, Lawrie (2014). Pembroke Dockyard and the Old Navy: A Bicentennial History. The History Press. ISBN 978-0-7509-5214-9.
- Winfield, Rif (2014). British Warships in the Age of Sail, 1817–1863: Design, Construction, Careers and Fates. Seaforth Publishing. ISBN 978-1-84832-169-4.
