= HMS Victoria (1859) =

Ship of the line of the Royal Navy

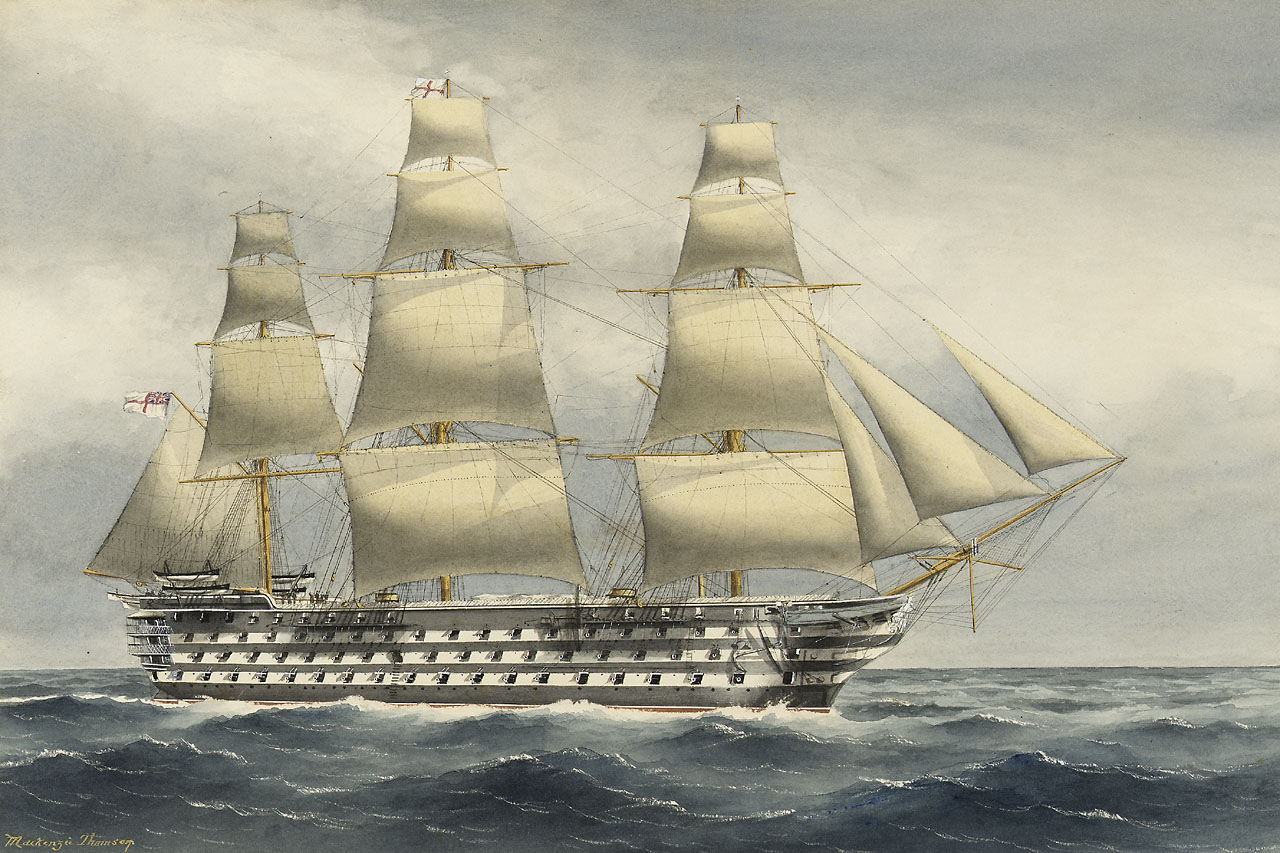
- HMS Victoria, painting by William Mackenzie Thomson

History

Royal NavyUnited Kingdom
- Name: Victoria
- Namesake: Queen Victoria
- Ordered: 6 January 1855
- Builder: HM Dockyard, Portsmouth
- Laid down: 1 April 1856
- Launched: 12 November 1859
- Commissioned: 2 November 1864
- Fate: Sold for scrap, 31 May 1893

General characteristics
- Class & type: Victoria-class ship of the line
- Displacement: 6,959 long tons (7,071 t)
- Tons burthen: 4,126 71/94 bm
- Length: 260 ft (79.2 m)
- Beam: 60 ft 1 in (18.3 m)
- Draught: 21 ft 2 in (6.5 m) (light)
- Depth of hold: 26 ft 10 in (8.2 m)
- Installed power: 8 fire-tube boilers; 4,403 ihp (3,283 kW; 4,464 PS)
- Propulsion: 1 propeller shaft; 1 steam engine
- Sail plan: Full-rigged ship
- Speed: 11.8 knots (21.9 km/h; 13.6 mph)
- Complement: 1,000 officers and ratings
- Armament: Lower gun deck: 32 × 8 in (203 mm) shell guns; Middle gun deck: 30 × 8 in guns; Upper gun deck: 32 × 32 pdr guns; Quarter deck: 26 × 32 pdr guns, 1 × 68 pdr gun

HMS Victoria was the lead ship of her class of 121-gun, first rate ships of the line built for the Royal Navy (RN) during the 1850s. She and her sister ship, HMS Howe, were the only British three-decker ships of the line to be designed from the start for screw propulsion, and were the largest wooden battleships of their time. She was the world's second-largest wooden battleship after Howe. She was also the world's second largest warship until the completion of HMS Warrior, Britain's first ironclad battleship, in 1861. Although the ship was completed in 1860, Victoria was not commissioned until 1864 when she became the flagship of Britain's Mediterranean Fleet. She was paid off in 1867 into the reserve fleet and was sold for scrap in 1893.

== Description ==
Victoria measured 260 feet (79.2 m) on the gundeck and 221 feet 10 inches (67.6 m) on the keel. She had a beam of 60 feet 1 inch (18.3 m), a maximum draught of 21 feet 2 inches (6.5 m), and a depth of hold of 26 feet 10 inches (8.2 m). The ship had a tonnage of 4,126 71/94 tons burthen and displaced 6,959 long tons (7,071 t). The great size of the Victoria class required that their hulls be reinforced by thick diagonal wrought-iron straps. The armament of the ships consisted of thirty-two 8 in (203 mm) shell guns on her lower gun deck, thirty 8-inch shell guns on the middle gun deck and thirty-two 32-pounder (56 cwt) guns (Note: "Cwt" is the abbreviation for hundredweight, 56 cwt referring to the weight of the gun.) on her upper gun deck. Between their forecastle and quarterdeck, they carried twenty-six 32-pounder (42 cwt) guns and a single 68-pounder (95 cwt) on a pivot mount. Their crew numbered 1000 officers and ratings.

Victoria was powered by a two-cylinder, horizontal single-expansion steam engine that was rated at 1000 nominal horsepower; it used steam from eight fire-tube boilers to drive the single propeller shaft. Her engine was built by Maudslay, Sons and Field and it produced 4,403 indicated horsepower (3,283 kW; 4,464 PS) during the ship's sea trials on 5 July 1860 which gave her a maximum speed of 11.8 knots (21.9 km/h; 13.6 mph). The Victoria-class ships were unique in the RN as the only wooden battleships with boiler rooms fore and aft of the engine room. Each boiler room was fitted with a funnel that could be retracted to reduce drag when under sail.

== Construction and career ==
Ultimately named after Queen Victoria, Victoria was the third ship of her name to serve in the RN. The ship was ordered on 3 April 1854 without a name and was named on 6 January 1855. She was laid down on 1 April 1856 at HM Dockyard, Portsmouth, and launched on 12 November 1859. Victoria was completed on 20 April 1860, and was immediately laid up as part of the reserve fleet at Portsmouth. The ship was finally commissioned by Captain James Graham Goodenough on 2 November 1864 and she became flagship of the Mediterranean Fleet under Vice-Admiral Robert Smart. On 19 April 1866, Victoria became the flagship of Vice-Admiral Lord Clarence Paget with Captain Alan Gardiner in command. As of 10 June 1867, the ship was commanded by Commander William Codrington and served as the flagship of Admiral Sir Thomas Pasley. Victoria returned home in time to participate in the Fleet review at Spithead on 17 July and she was paid off on 7 August at Portsmouth. She became part of the reserve fleet again and was sold for scrap on 31 May 1893.

== Bibliography ==
- Colledge, J. J.; Warlow, Ben & Bush, Steve (2020). Ships of the Royal Navy: The Complete Record of all Fighting Ships of the Royal Navy from the 15th Century to the Present (5th revised and updated ed.). Seaforth Publishing. ISBN 978-1-5267-9327-0.
- Friedman, Norman (2018). British Battleships of the Victorian Era. Naval Institute Press. ISBN 978-1-68247-329-0.
- Lambert, Andrew D. (1984). Battleships in Transition: The Creation of the Steam Battlefleet 1815-1860. Conway Maritime Press. ISBN 0-85177-315-X.
- Manning, T. D. & Walker, C. F. (1959). British Warship Names. Putnam. OCLC 838607.
- Winfield, Rif (2010). First Rate: The Greatest Warships of the Age of Sail. Naval Institute Press. ISBN 978-1-59114-264-5.
- Winfield, Rif (2014). British Warships in the Age of Sail, 1817–1863: Design, Construction, Careers and Fates. Seaforth Publishing. ISBN 978-1-84832-169-4.
