= David Frederick Markham =

English priest

David Frederick Markham MA (1800 – 31 March 1853) was a Canon of Windsor from 1827 to 1853.

== Career ==
He was educated at Westminster School and Christ Church, Oxford, graduating with a BA in 1821 and an MA in 1814.

He was appointed:

- Assistant curate of Aberford 1823
- Vicar of Addingham, Cumberland 1825–1826
- Vicar of Stillingfleet, Yorkshire 1826–1838
- Rector of Great Horkesley, Essex 1838–1853
- Rural Dean of Dedham 1850

He was appointed to the fourth stall in St George's Chapel, Windsor Castle in 1827, and held the canonry until 1853.

He founded the Essex Antiquarian Society in 1852.
