= Inglefield Land =

Region in the Northwest of Greenland

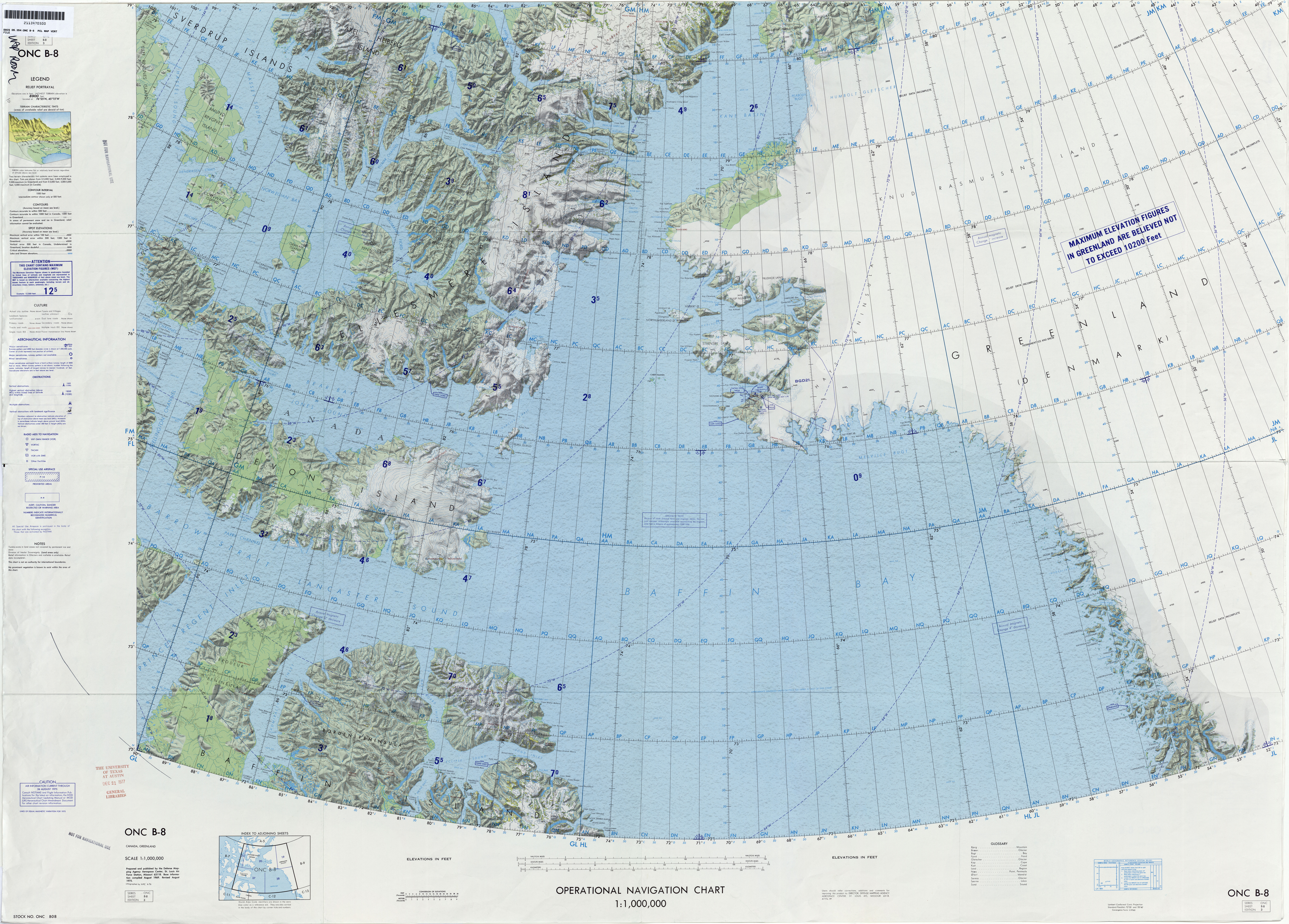
- ONC map of Eastern Ellesmere Island and Northwest Greenland.

- Location within Greenland
- Interactive map of Inglefield Land

Geography
- Location: NW Greenland
- Coordinates: 78°35′N 69°45′W
- Adjacent to: Smith Sound; Kane Basin; Peabody Bay
- Area: 7,000 km^{2} (2,700 sq mi)
- Length: 170 km (106 mi)
- Width: 50 km (31 mi)
- Highest elevation: 693 m (2274 ft)
- Highest point: Unnamed

Administration
- Greenland (Denmark)

Demographics
- Population: Uninhabited

Inglefield Land (Greenlandic: Avannaarliit) is an unglaciated area in the Avannaata municipality, Northwestern Greenland. It was named after English explorer Edward Augustus Inglefield by Elisha Kent Kane during the Second Grinnell Expedition from 1853 to 1855.

Inglefield Land is the northernmost area in Greenland in which an expedition permit is not required for stays exceeding 24 hours.

== History ==
Inglefield Land is noted for its archaeological sites, which show evidence of occupation by the Early Paleoeskimo, Independence I, Independence II, Dorset, Thule, and Inughuit cultures. Permanent habitation ended around 1989, although the region is still visited seasonally for hunting.

Historically, Inglefield Land was part of Prudhoe Land, which was the name given to a peninsula that stretched all the way from Inglefield Gulf to Cape Agassiz, as described by Edward Augustus Inglefield in 1852. Prudhoe Land is now considered a smaller region south of Inglefield Land between Cape Alexander in the northwest, Murchison Sound in the southwest, and Inglefield Gulf in the southeast.

In 2006, the longest longhouse in Greenland was discovered in southwestern Inglefield Land, north of Foulk Fjord at Reindeer Point, which measures 42 m (137 ft) long.

== Settlements ==
The last inhabited settlement in the region was Qaqaitsut on Paris Fjord in eastern Inglefield Land, which was briefly re-occupied by at least four Inughuit families in the mid-1980s as part of an initiative to “live on the land.” It has been abandoned since around 1989.

In addition, six other settlements existed in Inglefield Land, but were abandoned in the 20th century:

- Etah (inhabited up to 1953)
- Qamerfit (inhabited up to 1923)
- Annoatok (inhabited up to 1925)
- Aannartoq (inhabited up to 1927)
- Inuarfissuaq (inhabited up to 1959)
- Uingasoq

== Geography ==
The region stretches from a smaller peninsula just north of Cape Alexander to the southwest to Cape Agassiz at the northeastern end. Sunrise Point is the westernmost point of Inglefield Land. It is bounded by Prudhoe Land in the south, the Humboldt Glacier and Peabody Bay in the northeast, the Kane Basin to the north, and Smith Sound to the west. The Dodge Glacier is located to the southwest and the Hiawatha Glacier to the east. The McGary and Bonsall Islands are located off the northeastern and the Littleton Islands off the southwestern end. Ellesmere Island is located about 48 km (30 mi) west of Inglefield Land at Sunrise Point.

Inglefield Land is characterized by low-relief uplands that reach up to 700 m (2,296 ft) in elevation near the ice margin with incised valleys along the coast. Meltwater rivers from the Greenland Ice Sheet drain into these valleys and into Kane Basin. At the coast between Force Bay and Advance Bay, cliffs drop up to 300 m (984 ft) into Kane Basin; while inland it is mainly composed of flat plains with sparse vegetation. Lakes are abundant in Inglefield Land, covering 2% of the surface area, but are concentrated in certain areas. Large lakes are primarily found in the east near the Hiawatha Glacier, including the September Lakes.

== Geology ==
Inglefield Land was not heavily eroded since the ice sheet that covered it was largely cold-based. Rocks and sediments on Inglefield Land are of Paleoproterozoic, Mesoproterozoic to Paleozoic, and Quaternary origin.

== Flora and fauna ==
The region is dominated by barren rock plains and sparse vegetation. However, it is unusually flourishing for its location in the High Arctic. In sheltered fjords like Foulk Fjord and in valleys there is a higher vegetation cover from microclimates. The land animals include reindeer, muskox, Arctic fox, Arctic hare, and the Greenland wolf.

Marine mammals include polar bear, walrus, ringed seal, bearded seal, harp seal, hooded seal, narwhal, bowhead whale, and beluga whale. Most are seasonal visitors concentrated off southwestern Inglefield Land at the northern end of the North Water Polynya in Smith Sound.

Birds include little auk, raven, ptarmigan, red-throated diver, snow goose, gyrfalcon, common eider, king eider, snowy owl, Arctic skua, northern wheatear, snow bunting, Arctic tern, and Baird’s sandpiper. Most are migratory species that breed in the summer.

=== Muskox ===
The muskox went extinct in the region around the 1860s, until 14 yearlings were captured at Kangerlussuaq and released at Rensselaer Bay in 1986 in western Inglefield Land. In 1999, the population was estimated at 270.

=== Reindeer ===
The interior of Inglefield Land was historically an important reindeer hunting area. Historically, the population was at its highest before 1860. Throughout the late 1800s the population of the herd declined and reindeer disappeared from western Inglefield Land by 1910, linked to severe snow conditions during the winter of 1860-61 and heavy hunting by local Inughuit and polar explorers. In 1914, reindeer temporarily returned across the entire region with catches in 1915 yielding up to 100 animals, but heavy snowfall and heavy hunting pressure during the winter of 1916-17 severely reduced the herd. In 1920 regular annual autumn hunting trips to eastern Inglefield Land resumed which were usually successful, until reindeer hunting stopped in 1960 since the population became too scarce to reliably harvest. In 1978, an aerial and ground survey concluded that the reindeer population in Inglefield Land had gone extinct, but in 1981 reindeer were seen again. From roughly 1990 to 1993, catches of up to 180 animals were recorded in a single year, the highest since 1915, which indicated that the population was undergoing a boom phase. In 1995, the population was estimated at a maximum of 100 animals and a hunting ban on the region was placed, although hunters from Qaanaaq argued that the ban should be lifted, replaced with a regulated quota, and claimed that animals were more numerous than thought. In 1999, the population was estimated at 2,260 animals. In the subsequent years, hunters began reporting observations of reindeer in Prudhoe Land, north of Inglefield Gulf and Olrik Fjord, for the first time since around 1939, with high mortality of reindeer observed in western Inglefield Land in the winter, suggesting that the population likely was at its carrying capacity. The hunting ban on reindeer was lifted by 2005.

==== Taxonomic debate ====
Degerbøl (1957) concluded that the reindeer population was of origin from southwestern Greenland and that they were the subspecies barren-ground caribou (Rangifer tarandus groenlandicus), although Vibe (1967) referred to the population as the Peary caribou subspecies (R. t. pearyi). Banfield (1961) described the population as intergrades between groenlandicus and pearyi, but Roby et al. (1984), cited by Miller (1991), concluded that the population was environmentally stunted groenlandicus. The reindeer subspecies in Inglefield Land as confirmed by genetic testing by Landa et al. (2000), the barren-ground caribou (Rangifer tarandus groenlandicus), may possibly have genetic mixing with the Peary caribou subspecies (Rangifer tarandus pearyi) that lives on nearby Ellesmere Island, but there is no current evidence of genetic mixing of reindeer in Inglefield Land.
