= Deltaterrasserne =

Archaeological site in northern Greenland

Coordinates: 82°07′30″N 29°53′18″W

Deltaterrasserne ('delta terraces') is a pre-Inuit occupation archaeological site located near the head of Jørgen Brønlund Fjord on the Peary Land peninsula in northern Greenland. It is one of the largest archaeological sites in Peary Land, and was discovered in September 1948 by the Danish explorer and archaeologist Eigil Knuth during the second summer of the Danish Pearyland Expedition. Occupied during the period of 2,050–1,750 BC, the site contains features of Independence I and Independence II cultures.

== Function and construction ==
Deltaterrasserne was constructed of large, terraced stones, ranging from 5 m (16 ft) to 23 m (75 ft) above sea level. Knuth named the site's ruins and caches in order of their descending elevation. These are scattered over 800 m (2,600 ft) of beach terraces in a multicomponent campsite. The highest of the terrace sites is named Terrace A. Its three ruins contain tent rings, central hearth, charcoal, and a gravel berm periphery, along with a meat cache. Terrace B is located most centrally within the site and also has the most features, including open-air box hearths and dwellings. Terrace C contains only one feature, a cache with a paved lower floor. Terrace D contains caches, dwellings, and an open-air hearth. Terrace E is the lowest of the terraced ruins and features a Stone Age tent ring. A striking resemblance has been noted between the Deltaterrasserne dwellings with those from northern Eurasia.

== Artifacts ==
Hundreds of organic, faunal, and lithic artifacts were recovered. Organic artifacts included items such as axes, charred driftwood, pointed sticks, pins, and birch bark rolls. Faunal artifacts included bird, fish, and mammalian remains. Lithic artifacts include burin spalls. The most common artifacts were microblades, burins, flint flakers, and bone needles. Some needles exhibited rectangular eyeholes, typical of Independence II culture, while others had round eyeholes, typical of Independence I culture. Found at Terrace B was a side prong fragment for a leister or bird dart.

== Sources ==
- Peregrine, Peter Neal; Ember, Melvin, eds. (2001). "Encyclopedia of Prehistory: Volume 2: Arctic and Subarctic". Encyclopedia of Prehistory. Vol. 2, Arctic and subarctic (1 ed.). Springer. p. 40. ISBN 0-306-46256-7.
- Grønnow, Bjarne; Jensen, Jens Fog (2003). The Northernmost Ruins of the Globe. Meddelelser om Grønland., Man & society. Danish Polar Center : in cooperation with SILA. p. 124. ISBN 87-635-1262-9.
- McGhee, Robert (2001). Ancient people of the Arctic. UBC Press. ISBN 0-7748-0854-3.
