= Harry Whitney =

American sportsman, adventurer, and author (1873–1936)

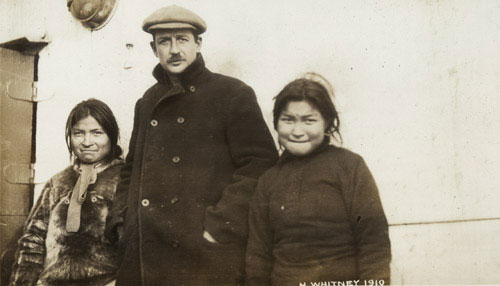
- Harry Whitney and Inuit Women, 1910
- Born: December 1, 1873; New Haven, Connecticut
- Died: May 20, 1936 (aged 62); Montreal, Quebec, Canada
- Occupations: Explorer, "sportsman"
- Known for: Arctic adventure, Peary-Cook controversy, author, photographer

Harry Whitney (December 1, 1873 – May 20, 1936) was an American sportsman, adventurer, and author. He traveled to northern Greenland with Robert Peary in 1908, staying over the winter with the Inughuit at Etah and Annoatok. In the spring of 1909 Whitney found himself at the center of the controversy between Frederick Cook and Peary over who had reached the North Pole first. A year after his return, he published a book on the trip. He is sometimes confused with his contemporary Harry Payne Whitney, who was no relation.

== Early life and education ==
Harry Whitney was born on December 1, 1873 in New Haven, Connecticut, to a wealthy family. His given name was "Henry", but he was known professionally as "Harry Whitney" throughout his adult life. His great-grandfather was Stephen Whitney, one of the first millionaires in New York City. His mother was Margaret Lawrence Johnson, a daughter of Bradish Johnson (1811–1892) who had owned a sugar plantation in Louisiana, and distillery and real estate in New York. He attended the Hopkins Grammar School in New Haven and St. Paul's School in Garden City, Long Island.

Whitney worked briefly at Wallace & Sons, a wire manufacturing company in Ansonia, Connecticut, in 1901 and 1902. In 1903 he went by sailing vessel to Australia. There he spent two years learning about the sheep business and mining. Whitney returned to the United States in 1905, where he spent some time ranching in the West. He eventually became known as a big game hunter, or "sportsman".

== Arctic ==
In July 1908, when Whitney was 34 years old, he and two "sportsman" friends found berths on the Roosevelt and the Erik, the ships carrying Peary's expedition north for his final attempt to reach the Pole. Whitney and his friends hoped to hunt musk ox, polar bears, and other arctic game and then return on the ship. However, upon reaching Etah, Greenland, they learned that musk ox could only be hunted in the late winter. Whitney decided to overwinter in a small shack made from packing materials on the shore. His friends returned to New York aboard the Erik. The Roosevelt continued on to Peary's base camp at Cape Sheridan, Ellesmere Island.

With the help of the local Greenlandic Inuit, Whitney was able to hunt walrus, narwhales, polar bear, and other game. In the spring, the native people brought him to Ellesmere Island to hunt musk ox. Whitney attempted to keep a musk ox calf alive to bring back to the Philadelphia Zoo, but the calf did not survive.

On April 18, 1909, Whitney met Frederick Cook and his two Inuit companions on the ice on Smith Sound. Cook claimed that the previous year the three men had been to the North Geographic Pole, and then had overwintered on Ellesmere Island. Cook left some items with Whitney and headed to southern Greenland to report his triumph. When Peary came south on the Roosevelt later that summer, he refused to allow Whitney to bring Cook's belongings on his ship. Cook would later claim that proof of his discovery had been among the papers Peary refused to embark. When Whitney reached St. John's, Newfoundland in September, he found himself at the center of the rival claims of Cook and Peary. He declined to take sides in the controversy. The following year Whitney published his book Hunting With the Eskimos, illustrated with his own photographs and reproductions of pencil drawings done by the Inuit at Etah.

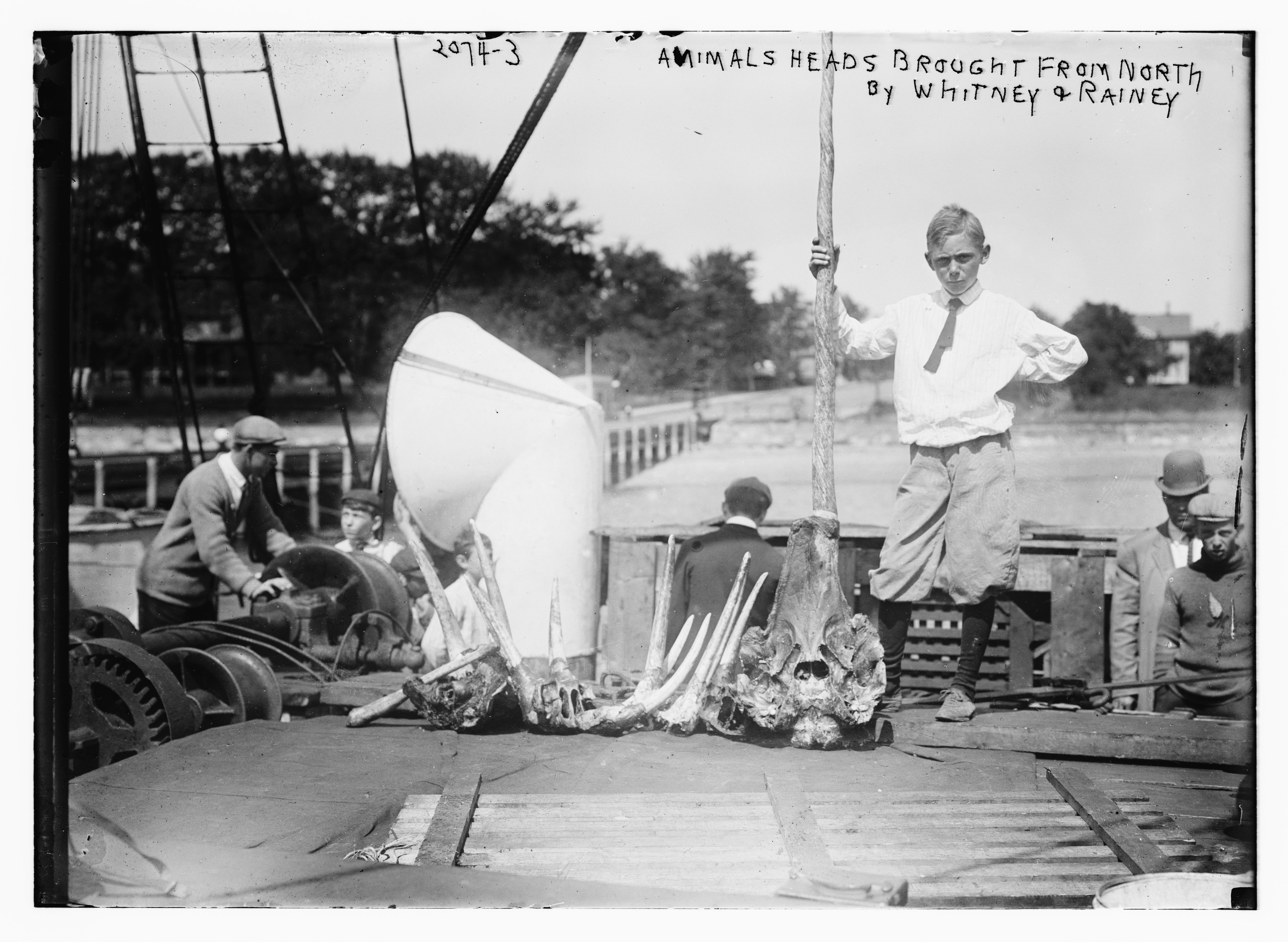
Animal heads brought from North by Whitney and Rainey c. 1909-1910

== Later life ==
In 1910, Whitney went back to Greenland with his friend Paul Rainey. On their return, they presented the Bronx Zoo with two live polar bears. In 1916, Whitney married Mrs. Eunice Chesebro Kenison, with Captain Bob Bartlett serving as an usher. When the United States entered World War I, Whitney served as a captain in the Ordnance Section of the United States Army. After the war he attended Cornell, where he studied agriculture. He continued to hunt in Alaska, the Rocky Mountains, and the Arctic, providing skins and specimens to the Philadelphia Academy of Natural Sciences and the Philadelphia Zoo as well as the Bronx Zoo. The Whitneys lived in Kennett Square, Pennsylvania, at the time of his death. He died at a hospital in Montreal on May 20, 1936.
