= Mount Barrille =

Mountain in the American state of Alaska

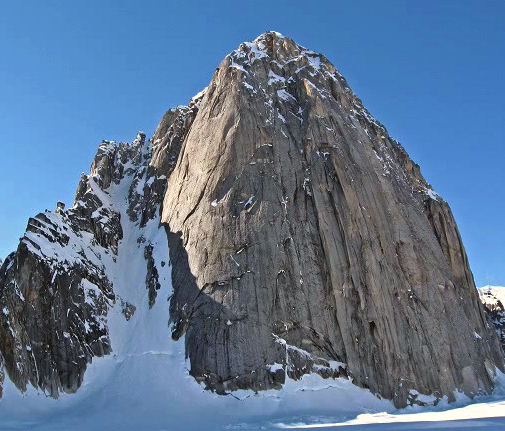
- East face of Barrille with Japanese Couloir (left)

Highest point
- Elevation: 7,650 ft (2,330 m)
- Prominence: 1,201 ft (366 m)
- Parent peak: Mount Dickey
- Coordinates: 62°58′00″N 150°43′17″W

Geography
- Location within Alaska
- Interactive map of Mount Barrille
- Country: United States
- State: Alaska
- Borough: Matanuska-Susitna
- Protected area: Denali National Park
- Parent range: Alaska Range
- Topo map: USGS Talkeetna D-2

Geology
- Rock type: Granite

Climbing
- First ascent: July 20, 1957 by Fred Beckey and John Rupley
- Easiest route: West face

Mount Barrille is a 7,650 ft (2,330 m) mountain summit located in the Alaska Range, in Denali National Park and Preserve, in the U.S. state of Alaska. It is situated 2,650 feet above the Ruth Glacier at the gateway to the Don Sheldon Amphitheater, or The Great Gorge, depending on direction of travel. Barrille is set 11.43 mi (18 km) southeast of Denali, 3.37 mi (5 km) west of The Mooses Tooth, 3.68 mi (6 km) east of The Rooster Comb, and 1.42 mi (2 km) north of Mount Dickey which is the nearest higher peak. The mountain was named by famed explorer Dr. Frederick Cook for Edward Barrill (1861–1946), a horse packer from Darby, Montana, who was his sole companion during his 1906 claim to be the first to climb Denali. The claim was later disproved, and in 1909 Barrill signed an affidavit stating that they had not reached the summit. Cook referred to his companion as Barrille in his accounts of the expedition, and Barrille remains as the official spelling used by the United States Geological Survey.

== Climbing ==
Despite its relatively low elevation, Mt. Barrille is notable for its imposing east face with nearly 2,600 feet of vertical sheer granite. It is one of the more frequently climbed peaks in the Ruth Gorge owing in part to its proximity to the air taxi landing area and the Sheldon Chalet immediately west of the peak. There are several climbing routes with different ranges of technical difficulty. The Japanese Couloir is a moderate, Alaska grade III route featuring steep 55-70 degree angle snow and ice. The first ascent of this route was made in 1976 by Teruaki Segawa, Kensei Suga, Masayuki Suemasa, and Eiji Tsai.

Another popular route to the summit is the Cobra Pillar, a direct line up the central pillar of the east face. Named for its resemblance to a cobra from certain angles, this route is rated YDS 5.11. The first ascent of this route was made by Jim Donini and Jack Tackle over six days in June 1991. The first one-day speed ascent of the route was made in June 2004 by Joe Puryear and Chris McNamara.

The Baked Alaskan route is on the east face and is rated 5.10+. The first ascent was made by Brian Teale and Scott Thelen in July 2001.

The west aspect of the mountain is covered by glacial ice and gentle enough to be descended by skiing.

== Climate ==
Based on the Köppen climate classification, Mount Barrille is located in a Tundra climate zone with long, cold, snowy winters, and cool summers. Weather systems are forced upwards by the Alaska Range (orographic lift), causing heavy precipitation in the form of snowfall. Winter temperatures can drop below −20 °F with wind chill factors below −30 °F. The months May through June offer the most favorable weather for viewing and climbing.

== Gallery ==
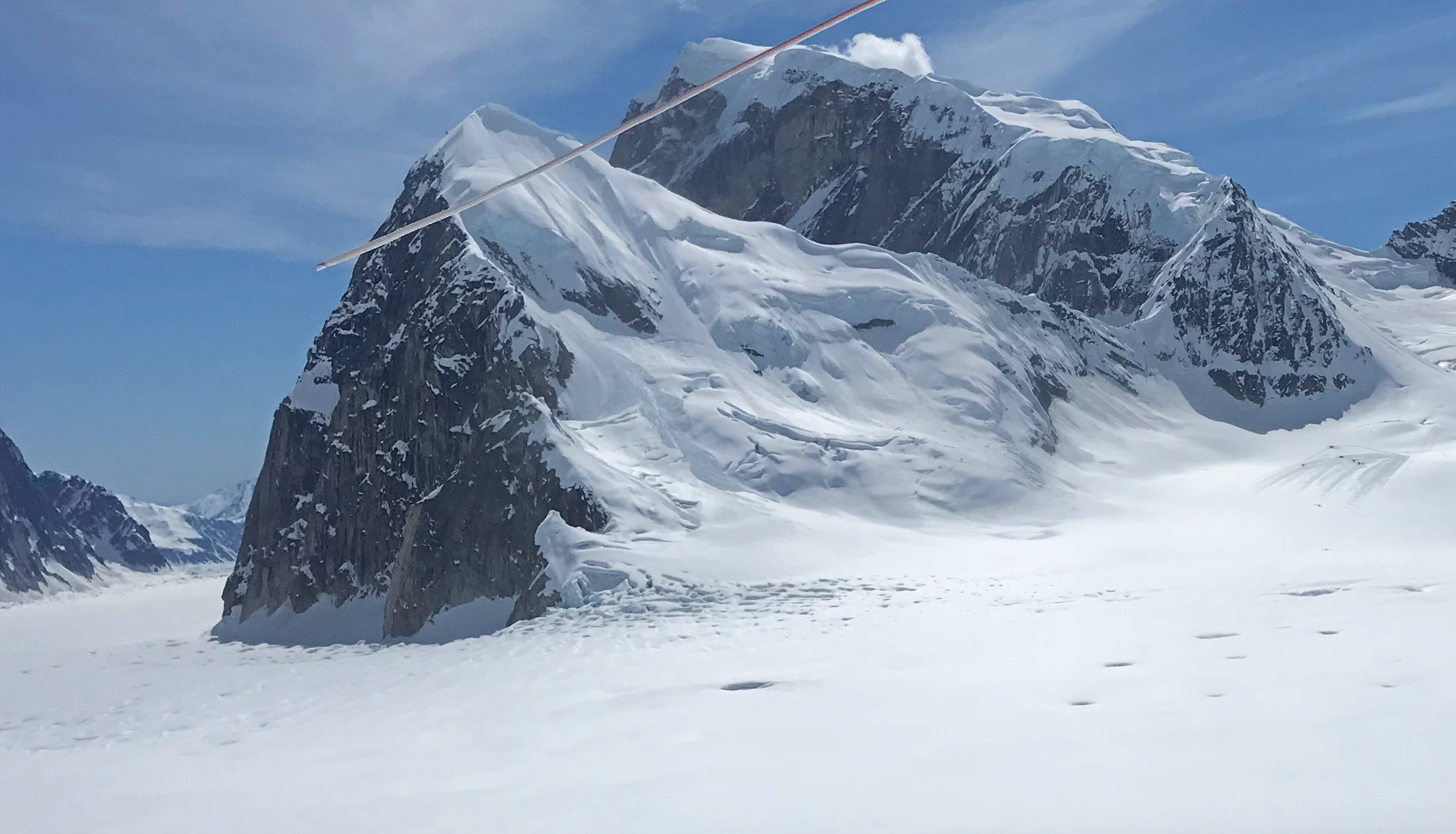
Mt. Barrille (front) with Mt. Dickey behind, as seen from the north at Don Sheldon Amphitheater (formerly Ruth Amphitheater)

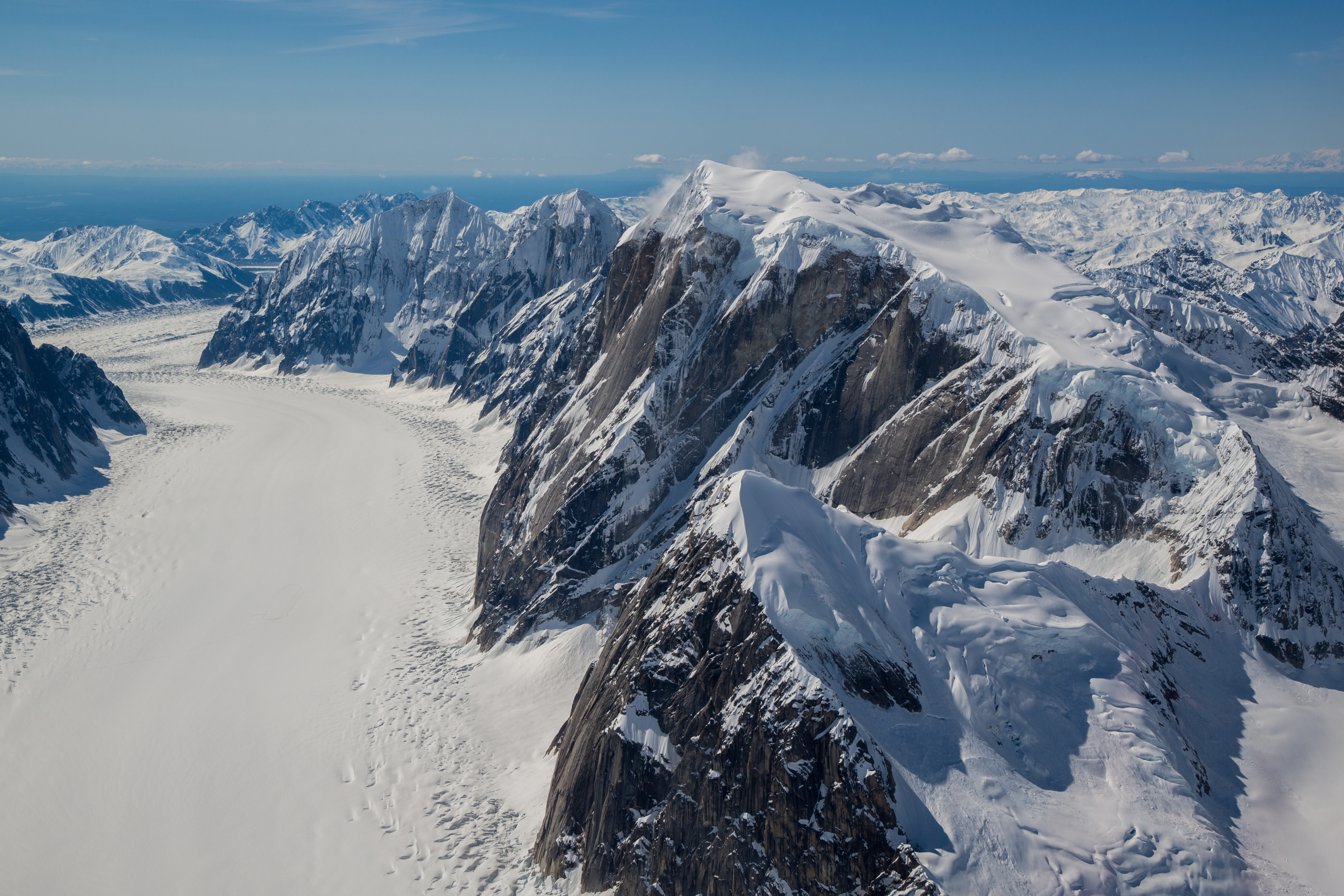
Ruth Glacier, Mt. Dickey, and Mt. Barrille (bottom)

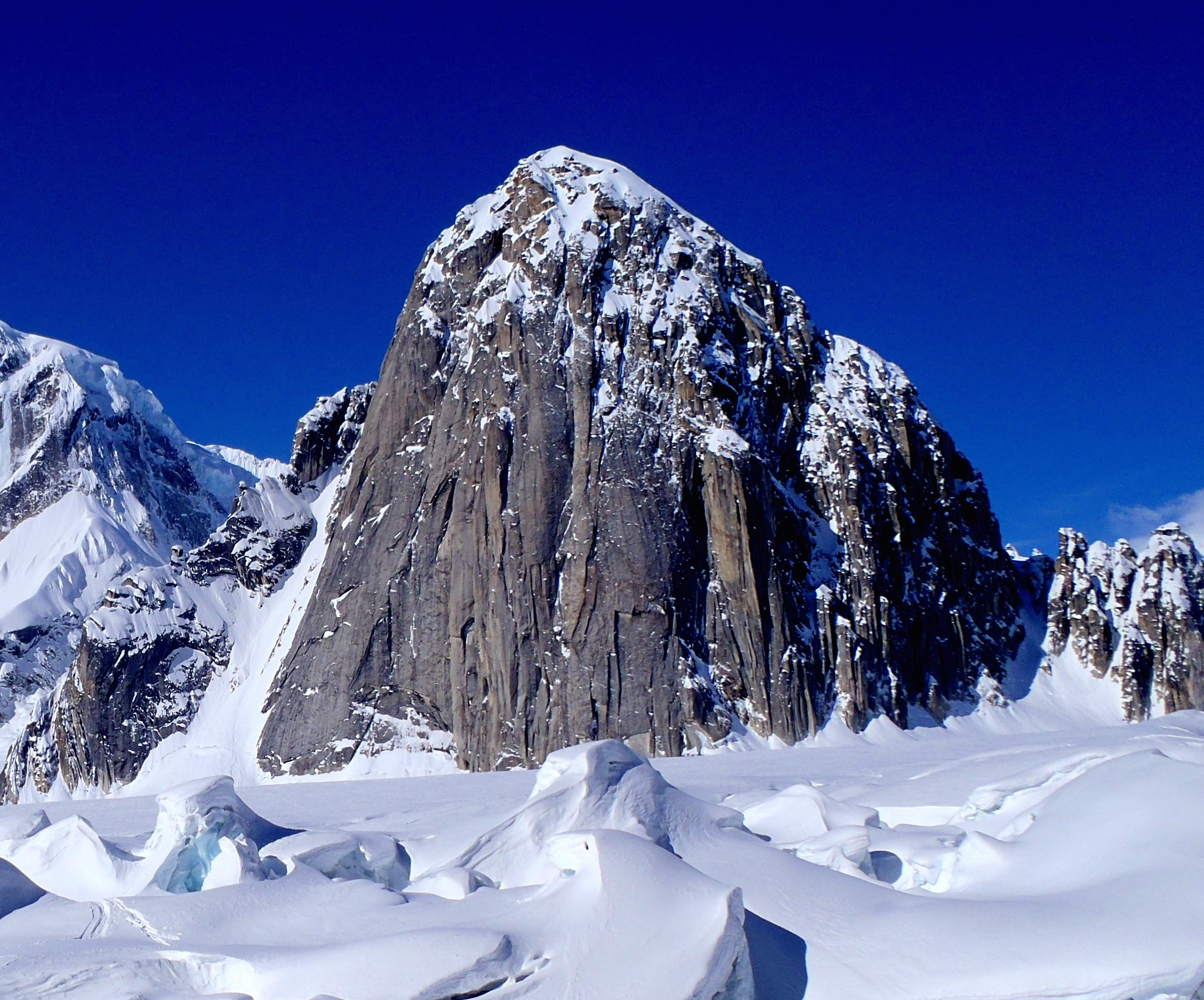

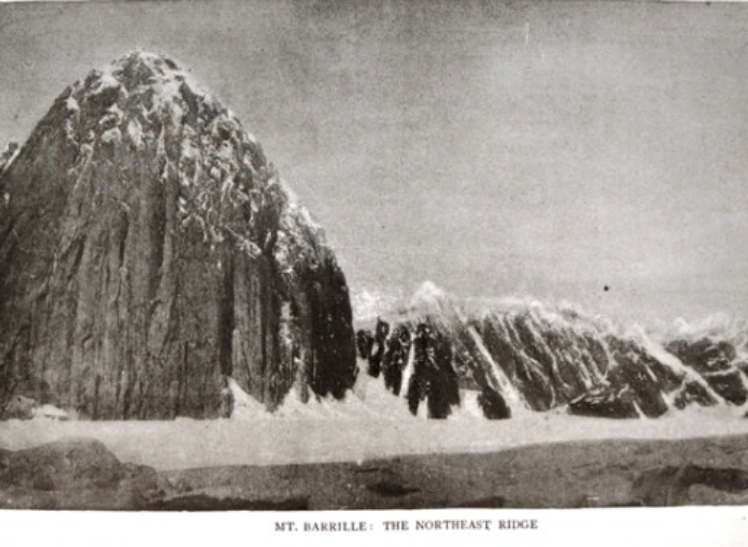
Mount Barrille as it appears in Frederick Cook's book "To the Top of the Continent" (1908)

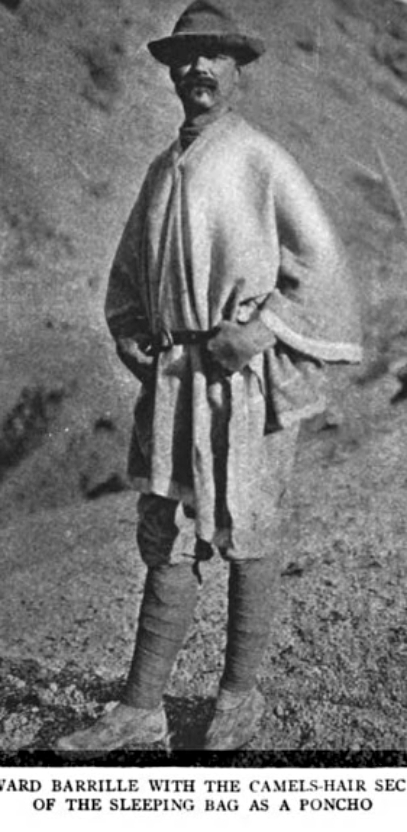
Edward Barrill circa 1908

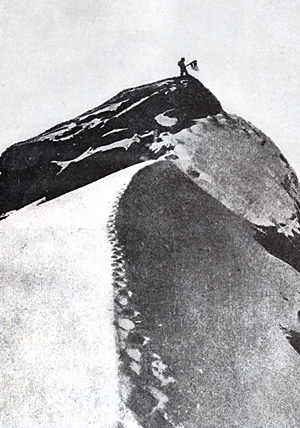
Cook's hoax photo of Ed Barrill atop a peak claimed to be Mt. McKinley

== See also ==
- Mountain peaks of Alaska
- Fake Peak
