= Sutherland Island =

Island in Greenland

Native name: Tigssarfik
- Location within Greenland

Geography
- Location: Baffin Bay, Greenland
- Coordinates: 78.15°N 72.9°W
- Length: 1.5 km (0.93 mi)
- Width: 0.45 km (0.28 mi)
- Highest elevation: 90 m (300 ft)

Administration
- Greenland
- Municipality: Avannaata

Demographics
- Population: uninhabited

Sutherland Island (Danish: Sutherland Ø; Greenlandic: Tigssarfik) is an island in Baffin Bay, in Avannaata municipality, off the NW shores of Greenland.

== Geography ==
Sutherland Island is located at the southern end of Smith Sound, 5 km (3.1 mi) southeast of Cape Alexander, off the terminus of the Storm Glacier. It is a 1.5 km (0.93 mi) long rocky sandstone island. Its highest point is 90 m (300 ft) high. It is surrounded by ice most of the year.

== See also ==
- List of islands of Greenland
