= Foulk Fjord =

Fjord in Greenland

- Iitap Kangerlua
- Location in Greenland
- Location: Arctic
- Coordinates: 78°18′N 72°35′W
- Ocean/sea sources: Baffin Bay
- Basin countries: Greenland
- Max. length: 5 mi (8.0 km)
- Max. width: 1.5 miles (2.4 km)
- Average depth: 90 feet (27 m)
- Settlements: Etah

Foulk Fjord (Foulke Fjord) (Greenlandic: Iitap Kangerlua) is a fjord in Avannaata municipality in northwestern Greenland.

== Geography ==
Located near Reindeer Point, the fjord is about 1.5 miles (2.4 km) wide and 5 miles (8 km) long with 2,000 ft (610 m) cliffs on each side. Brother John Glacier terminates at the eastern end of the fjord. At the foot of the glacier is Alida Lake, a small body of fresh water. A small island known as Taliilaq is located in the middle of the fjord. The northern end of Baffin Bay west of the former village of Etah, narrows into Nares Strait between Greenland and Ellesmere Island, and is usually frozen from October to July. Given the harsh climate, the growing season in the fjord is limited to about six to eight weeks.

== History ==
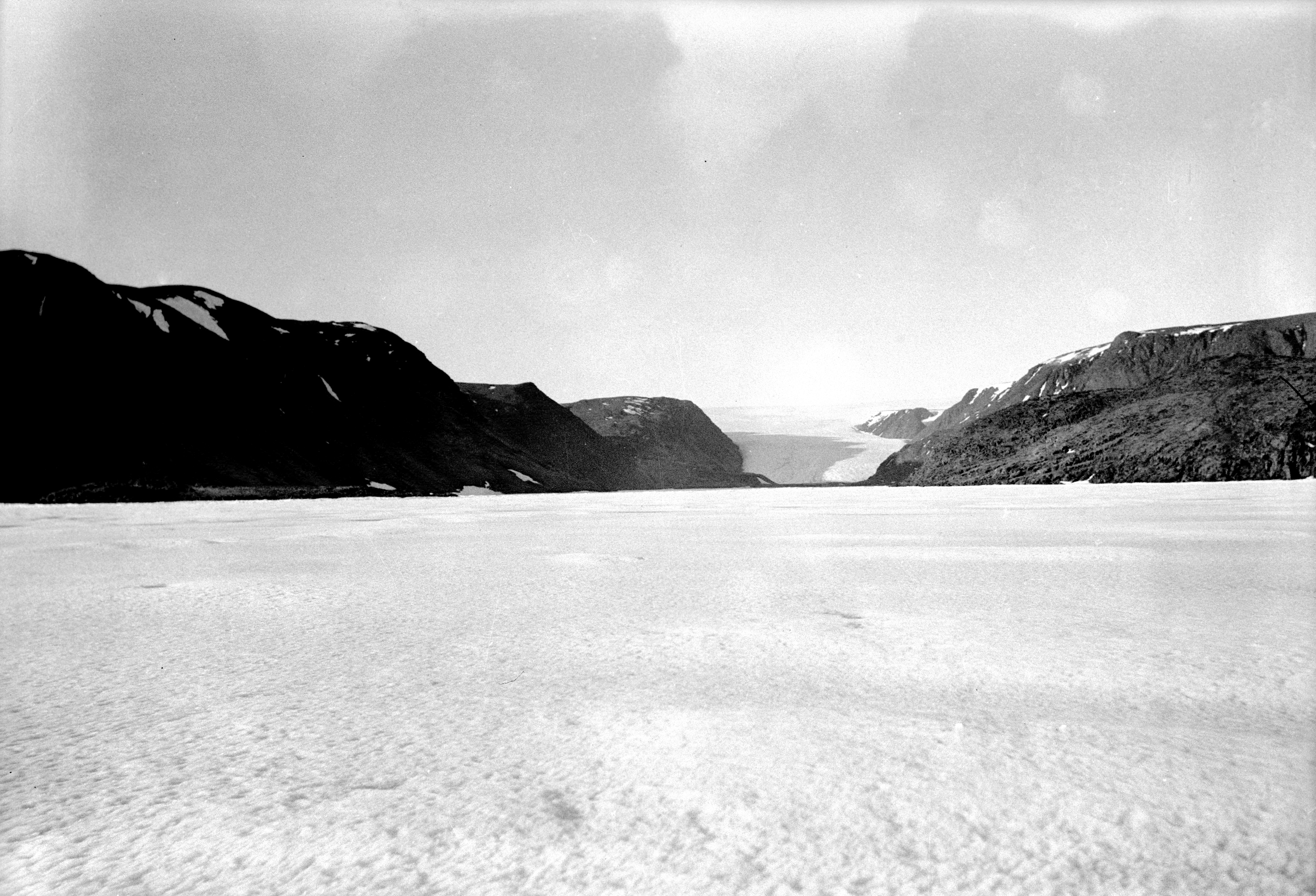
Brother John's Glacier as seen from Foulke Fjord (frozen) near Etah, Greenland, Spring 1938

The area lies on the ancient migration route from the north of the Canadian Arctic, with several waves of ancient migrants passing through the area, from the northbound Independence I and Independence II cultures 4,400 and 2,700 years ago, respectively, to the southbound Thule culture migrants a thousand years ago. It is also the point where the last migration of the Inuit from Baffin Island reached the coast of Greenland in 1865. An Inuk shaman named Qidlaq led the migrants from Baffin Island alongside the coast of Ellesmere Island for seven years, crossing the strait and fjord to Etah. The group split there, with some returning to Pond Inlet in Canada at a cost of many lives. Inhabitants of Pituffik, later relocated to Qaanaaq, are partially descended from this last group of Arctic migrants to Greenland.

== See also ==
- Hiawatha Glacier
- List of fjords of Greenland
