= Hartstene Bay =

Bay in Avannaata, Greenland

- Hartstene Bugt
- Location in Greenland
- Location: Arctic
- Coordinates: 78°16′N 72°43′W
- Ocean/sea sources: Smith Sound
- Basin countries: Greenland

Hartstene Bay is a small bay on the north-west coast of Greenland. It is part of the Avannaata municipality.

Cape Alexander is located at the western end of this bay.
