= Bonsall Islands =

Island group in Greenland

- Location within Greenland

Geography
- Location: Kane Basin
- Coordinates: 79°10′N 66°39′W

Administration
- Greenland
- Municipality: Avannaata

Demographics
- Population: uninhabited

The Bonsall Islands is a small coastal island cluster in the Avannaata municipality, off northwest Greenland.

The islands are named after Amos Bonsall of the Second Grinnell Expedition.

== Geography ==
The Bonsall Islands are a chain of islands, islets and rocks at the southern end of Peabody Bay, east of Dallas Bay. They are located off Cape Agassiz, to the SW of the McGary Islands. These small islands line the shore of Inglefield Land, which is deeply indented, for approximately 10 km.

== See also ==
- List of islands of Greenland
