= Dodge Glacier =

Glacier in Greenland

- Dodge Gletscher
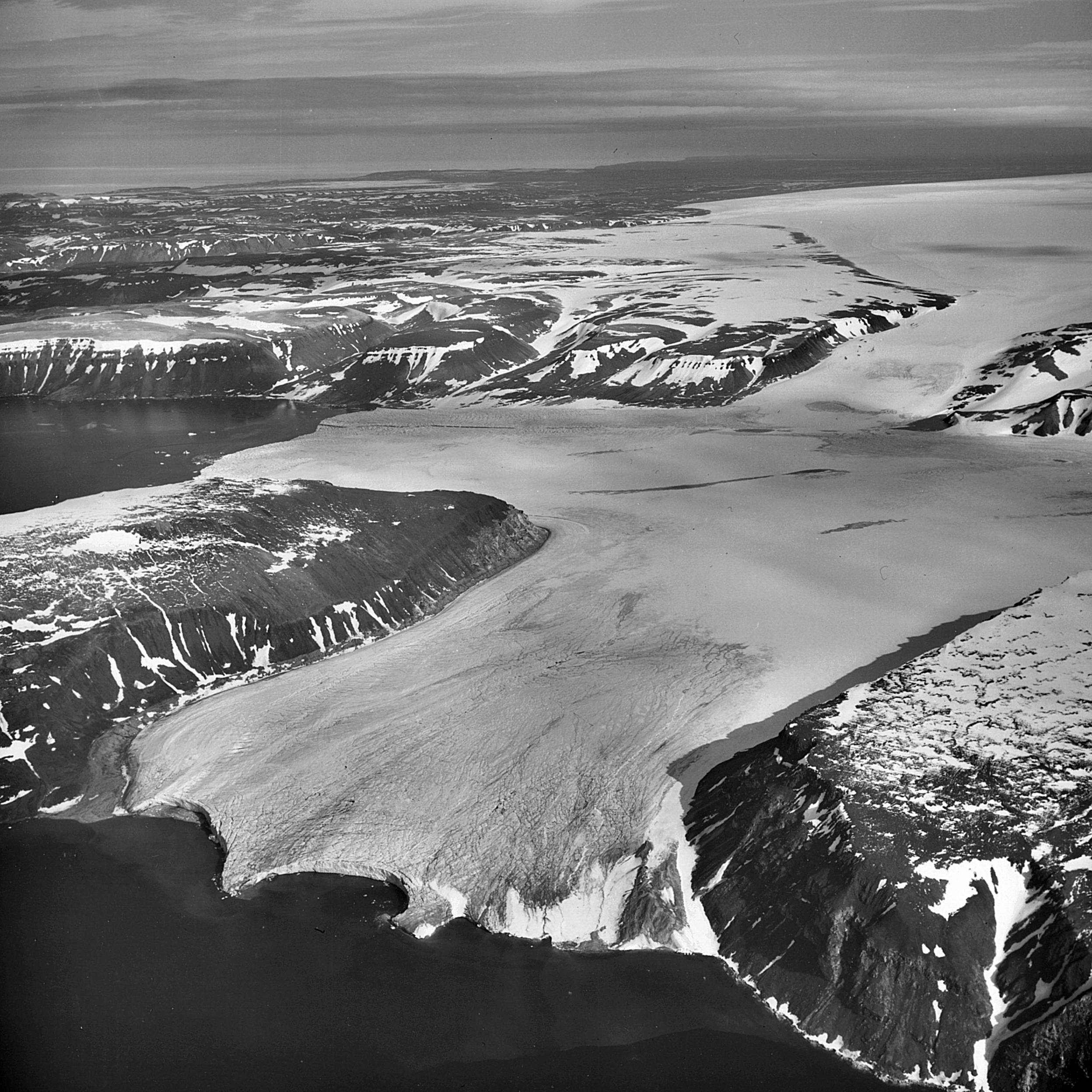
- View of the Dodge Glacier

- Location within Greenland
- Type: Tidal outlet glacier
- Location: Greenland
- Coordinates: 78°12′N 72°42′W
- Width: 4 km (2.5 mi)
- Terminus: Smith Sound; Baffin Bay
- Status: Retreating

Dodge Glacier (Danish: Dodge Gletscher), is a glacier in northwestern Greenland. Administratively it belongs to the Avannaata municipality.

The glacier was named by Isaac Israel Hayes (1832–1881) after expedition member Henry W. Dodge during the American Arctic Expedition of 1860–1861.

== Geography ==
The Dodge Glacier has its terminus in the Smith Sound, east of Cape Alexander (Ullersuaq), north of the Storm Glacier. The Dodge and Storm glaciers don't discharge directly from the Greenland Ice Sheet, but from an ice cap located at the southwestern end of Inglefield Land which is attached to the Ice Sheet from the southeast.

In the same manner as the neighboring Storm Glacier, the Dodge Glacier has retreated significantly in recent years.

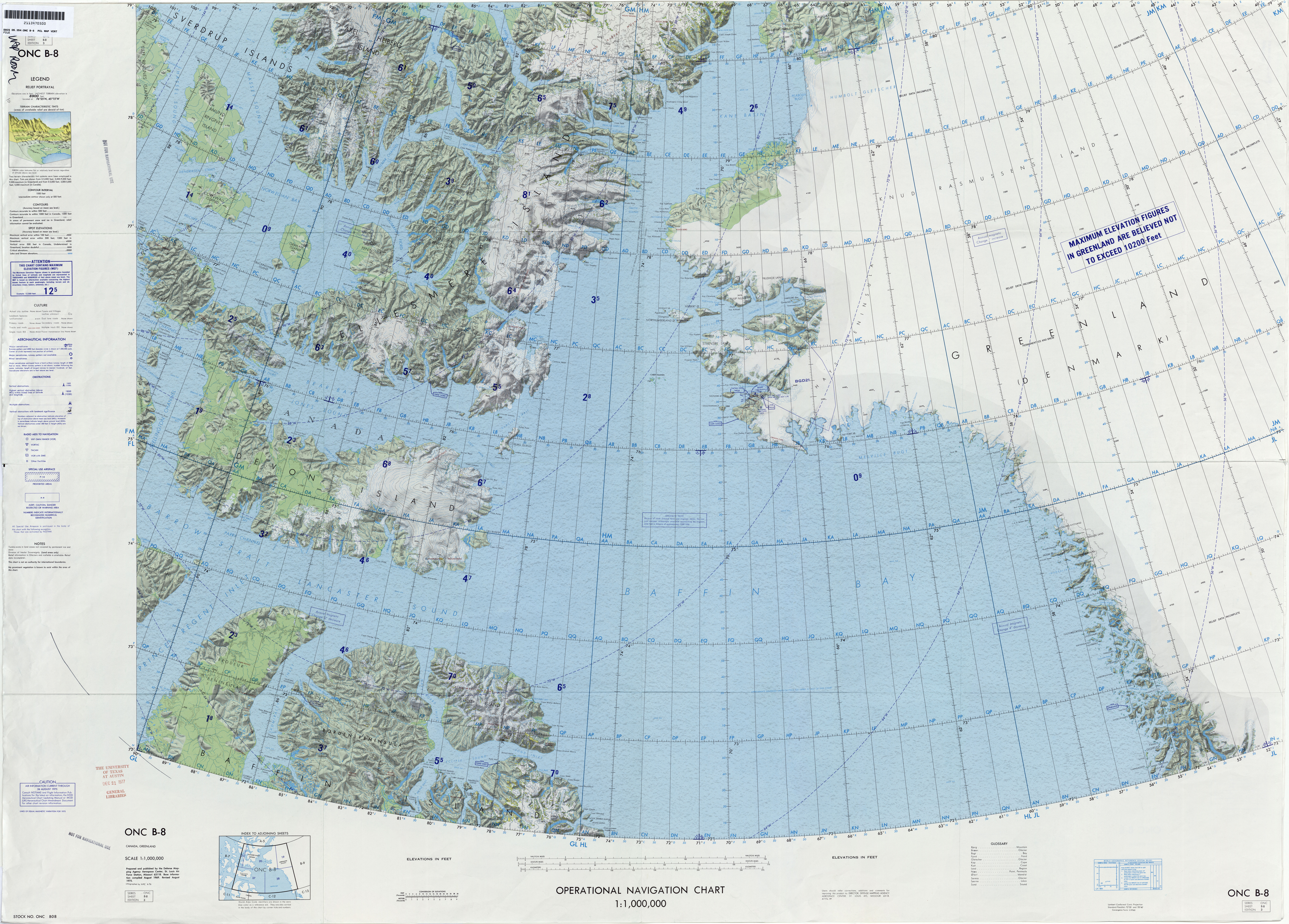
Map of Northwestern Greenland

== See also ==
- List of glaciers in Greenland
- Operation IceBridge
