= McGary Islands =

Island group near Greenland

- Location within Greenland

Geography
- Location: Kane Basin
- Coordinates: 79.206944°N 65.923611°W

Administration
- Greenland
- Municipality: Avannaata

Demographics
- Population: uninhabited

The McGary Islands is a small coastal island group in Avannaata municipality, off NW Greenland.

The islands are named after James McGary of the Second Grinnell Expedition. They are a breeding ground for the common eider.

== Geography ==
The McGary Islands are a cluster of coastal islands, islets and rocks at the southern end of Peabody Bay about 6 km off Cape Agassiz and off the southern end of the Humboldt Glacier. The islands are small and are located close to the shore of Inglefield Land, 15 km to the NE of the Bonsall Islands.

== See also ==
- List of islands of Greenland
