= Peabody Bay =

Bay in northwestern Greenland

- Peabody Bugt
- Location in Greenland
- Location: Arctic
- Coordinates: 79°37′N 66°15′W
- Ocean/sea sources: Kane Basin
- Basin countries: Greenland
- Max. length: 120 km (75 mi)
- Max. width: 70 km (43 mi)
- Settlements: Qaqaitsut, Nunatami

Peabody Bay (Danish: Peabody Bugt) is a large bay in northwestern Greenland. Administratively it is part of Avannaata municipality.

== Geography ==
Peabody Bay is located on the eastern side of the Kane Basin off the western end of the Humboldt Glacier. Cape Forbes and the Cass Fjord lie at the northern end of the roughly 70 km wide bay. The McGary Islands lie at the southern end of the bay and the Bonsall Islands lie between that end and Dallas Bay to the SW.

Elisha Kane —whose Arctic venture in search of the lost Franklin expedition crossed the area in 1854— had named the Kane Basin itself "Peabody Bay," in honor of philanthropist George Peabody, the major funder of Kane's expedition. Currently, however, Peabody Bay is this smaller bay at the eastern side of the basin.

Qaqaitsut in eastern Inglefield Land was the last settlement to be inhabited on the southern part of Peabody Bay. After being re-occupied in the mid-1980s, it was abandoned around 1989. Nunatami in southern Washington Land on the northern part of Peabody Bay was inhabited from 1917 to 1920.

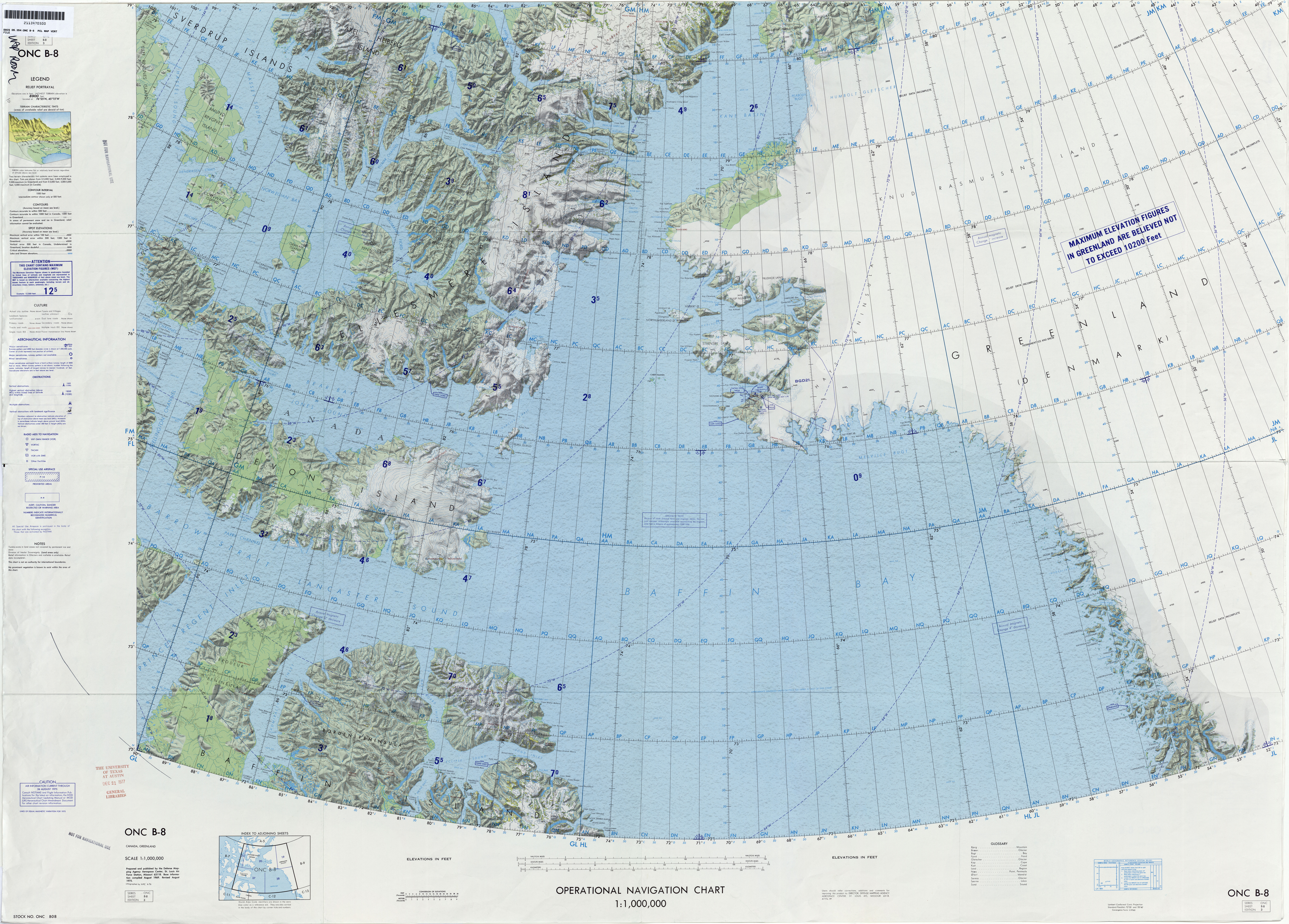
Map of Northwestern Greenland

== See also ==
- Second Grinnell Expedition
