= Humboldt Glacier =

Glacier in Greenland

- Humboldt Gletscher
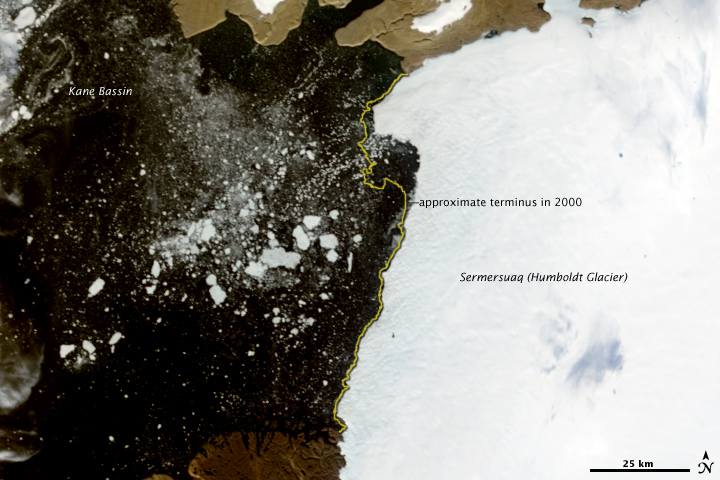
- Satellite image of Humboldt Glacier

- Location within Greenland
- Type: Tidewater glacier
- Location: Greenland
- Coordinates: 79°30′N 63°00′W
- Terminus: Kane Basin

Humboldt Glacier (Danish: Humboldt Gletscher; Greenlandic: Sermsersuaq), is one of the major glaciers in northern Greenland.

The glacier is named after German naturalist Alexander von Humboldt and is the widest tidewater glacier in the Northern Hemisphere.

== Geography ==
The Humboldt Glacier borders the Kane Basin in North West Greenland. Its front is 110 km (68 mi) wide. It has been retreating in the period of observation spanning 1975–2010.

Humboldt Glacier fringes the coast of Peabody Bay from north to south. The McGary Islands lie off the glacier at the southern end of the bay.

The Humboldt Glacier separates two large, mostly unglaciated areas: Inglefield Land to the southwest, and Washington Land to the north.

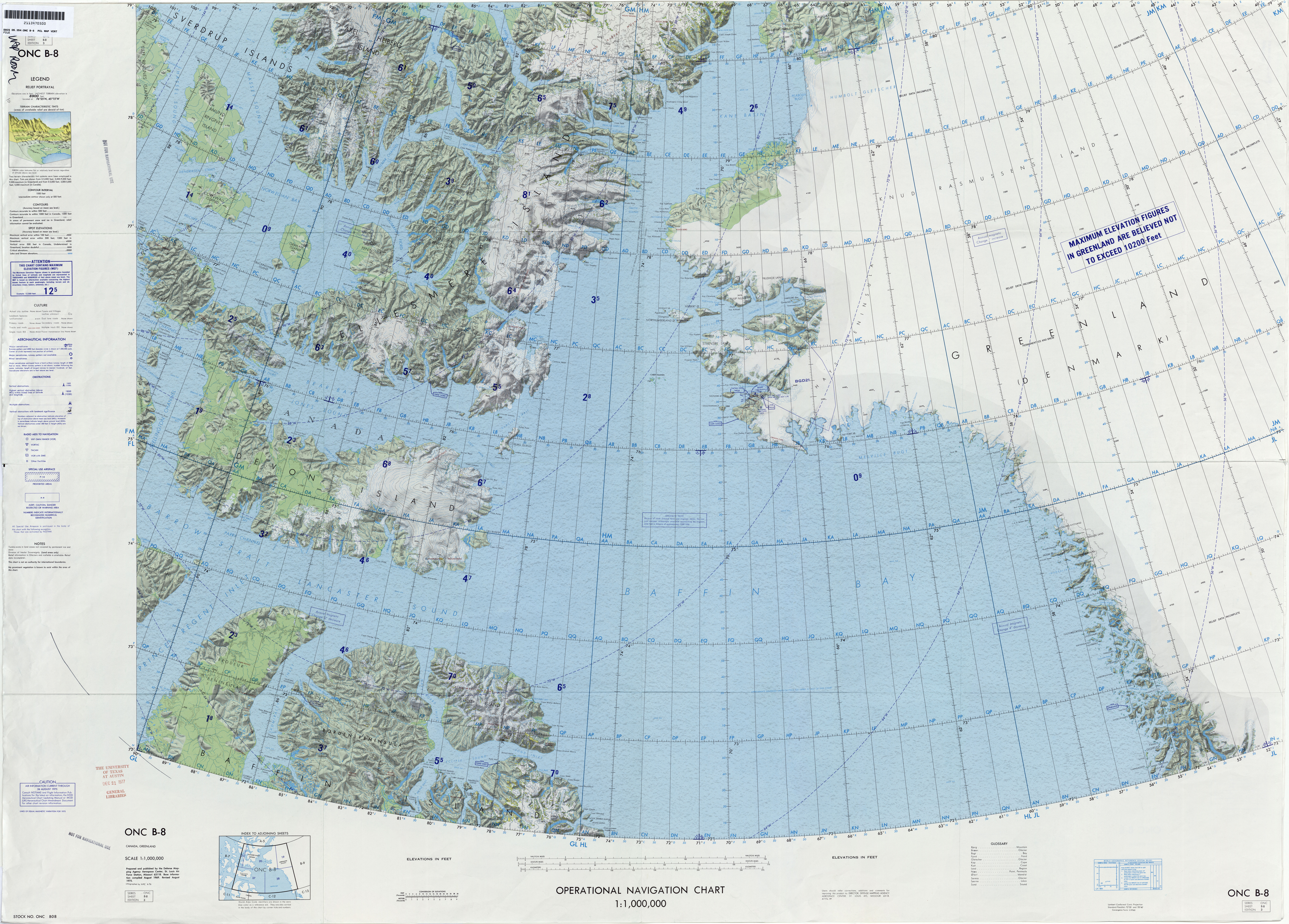
Map of Northwestern Greenland

== See also ==
- List of glaciers in Greenland
- Peabody Bay
