= Frederick Cook =

American explorer (1865–1940)

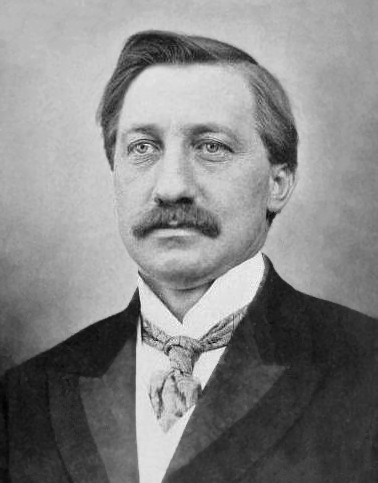
- Cook c. 1906
- Born: Fredrick Albert Cook; June 10, 1865; Hortonville, New York, U.S.
- Died: August 5, 1940 (aged 75); New Rochelle, New York, U.S.
- Resting place: Forest Lawn Cemetery
- Education: Columbia University; New York University Medical School
- Spouses: Libby Forbes (m. 1889; died 1890) Marie Fidele Hunt (m. 1902; div. 1923)

Frederick Albert Cook (June 10, 1865 – August 5, 1940) was an American explorer, medical doctor and ethnographer, who is most known for allegedly being the first to reach the North Pole on April 21, 1908. A competing claim was made a year later by Robert Peary, though both men's accounts have since been fiercely disputed; in December 1909, after reviewing Cook's limited records, a commission of the University of Copenhagen ruled his claim unproven. Nonetheless, in 1911, Cook published a memoir of the expedition in which he maintained the veracity of his assertions. In addition, he also claimed to have been the first person to reach the summit of Denali (also known as Mount McKinley), the highest mountain in North America, a claim which has since been similarly discredited. Though he may not have achieved either Denali or the North Pole, his was the first and only expedition where a United States national discovered an Arctic island in North America, Meighen Island.

Cook also remains well-known for his participation on the Belgian Antarctic Expedition (1897–1899) where, as the sole doctor on board, he is widely credited with saving most of the crew from death through his medical perception.

== Biography ==
Cook was born in Hortonville, New York, in Sullivan County. (His birthplace is sometimes listed as Callicoon or Delaware, both also in Sullivan County.) His parents, Theodor and Magdalena Koch, were recent German immigrants who adopted an anglicized version of their surname. He attended local schools before college. After graduating from Columbia University, he studied medicine at what is today NYU's Grossman School of Medicine, receiving his doctorate in 1890.

Cook married Libby Forbes in 1889. She died two years later. In 1902, on his 37th birthday, he married Marie Fidele Hunt. They had two daughters together. They divorced in 1923.

=== Early expeditions ===
Cook was the surgeon on Robert Peary's Arctic expedition of 1891–1892.

In 1897, Cook twice visited Tierra del Fuego, where he met the English missionary Thomas Bridges. They studied the Selkʼnam and Yahgan peoples, with whom Bridges had worked for two decades. During this time, Bridges had prepared a manuscript on their language's grammar and a dictionary of more than 30,000 words. Several years later, Cook tried to publish the dictionary as his own.

Cook on the Belgian Antarctic Expedition, c. 1898

=== Belgian Antarctic Expedition, 1897-1899 ===
In October 1897, Cook joined the Belgian Antarctic Expedition in Rio de Janeiro, as the ship's physician. He contributed to saving the lives of its crew members when their ship – the Belgica – was ice-bound during the winter, as they had not prepared for such an event. It became the first expedition to winter in the Antarctic region.

Once the polar night set in, Cook noted the onset of what he called polar anemia amongst the crew, a term used to describe symptoms caused by the nutritional difficulties that plagued the expedition and the lack of sunlight during the Antarctic winter.

Cook developed a series of treatments during the course of the expedition. One of which, referred to as the 'baking treatment' by the crew, involving the patient standing naked in front of the stove, proved to be effective and has been likened to modern light therapy treatments.

Cook, after noticing symptoms of scurvy, began to stress the importance of fresh meat in the crew's diet, and noted a significant improvement in the health of the men once they had switched to primarily eating penguin meat.

Roald Amundsen, who was first mate on the Belgica, credited Cook with his survival in his diary of the expedition.

=== Summit of Denali ===
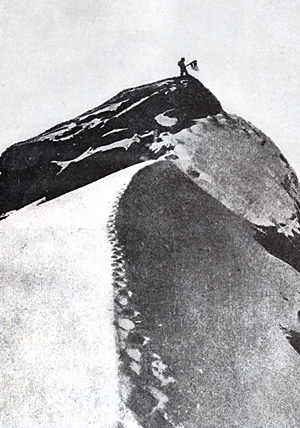
Alleged photo of Denali's summit, now known as Fake Peak

In 1903, Cook led an expedition to Denali, during which he circumnavigated the range. He made a second journey in 1906, after which he claimed to have achieved the first summit of its peak with one other expedition crew member. Other members, including Belmore Browne, whom Cook had left on the lower mountain, immediately but privately expressed doubt. Cook's claims were not publicly challenged until 1909 when the dispute with Peary over the North Pole claim erupted, with Peary's supporters claiming Cook's Denali ascent was also fraudulent.

Unlike Harry Karstens and Hudson Stuck in 1913, Cook had not taken photographs from atop Denali. His alleged photo of the summit was found to have been taken on a small outcrop on a ridge beside the Ruth Glacier, 19 miles (31 km) away.

In late 1909, Ed Barrill, Cook's sole companion during the 1906 climb, signed an affidavit saying that they had not reached the summit. In the late 20th century, historians found that he had been paid by Peary supporters to deny Cook's claim. (Henderson writes that this fact was covered up at the time, but Bryce says that it was never a secret.) Up until a month before, Barrill had consistently asserted that he and Cook had reached the summit. His 1909 affidavit included a map correctly locating what came to be called Fake Peak, featured in Cook's "summit" photo, and showing that he and Cook had turned back at the "Gateway" (north end of the Great Gorge, i.e. adjacent to Mount Barrille), 12 horizontal bee-line miles from Denali and 3 miles (4.8 km) below its top.

Climber Bradford Washburn gathered data, repeated the climbs, and took new photos to evaluate Cook's 1906 claim. Between 1956 and 1995, Washburn and Brian Okonek identified the locations of most of the photographs Cook took during his 1906 Denali foray and took new photos at the same spots. In 1997 Bryce identified the locations of the remaining photographs, including Cook's "summit" photograph; none were taken anywhere near the summit. Washburn showed that none of Cook's 1906 photos were taken past the Gateway.

A 1910 expedition by the Mazama Club reported that Cook's map departed abruptly from the landscape at a point when the summit was still 10 miles (16 km) distant. Critics of Cook's claims have compared Cook's map of his alleged 1906 route with the landscape of the last 10 miles (16 km). Cook's descriptions of the summit ridge are variously claimed to bear no resemblance to the mountain and to have been verified by many subsequent climbers. In the 1970s, climber Hans Waale found a route that fitted both Cook's narrative and descriptions. Three decades later, in 2005 and 2006, this route was successfully climbed by a group of Russian mountaineers.

No evidence of Cook's purported journey between the "Gateway" and the summit has been found. His claim to have reached the summit is not supported by his photos' vistas, his two sketch maps' markers, and peak-numberings for points attained. Similarly, neither his recorded compass bearings, barometer readings, route-map, nor camp trash support his claim of reaching the summit. In contrast, evidence in all of these categories have been found short of the Gateway.

=== North Pole ===
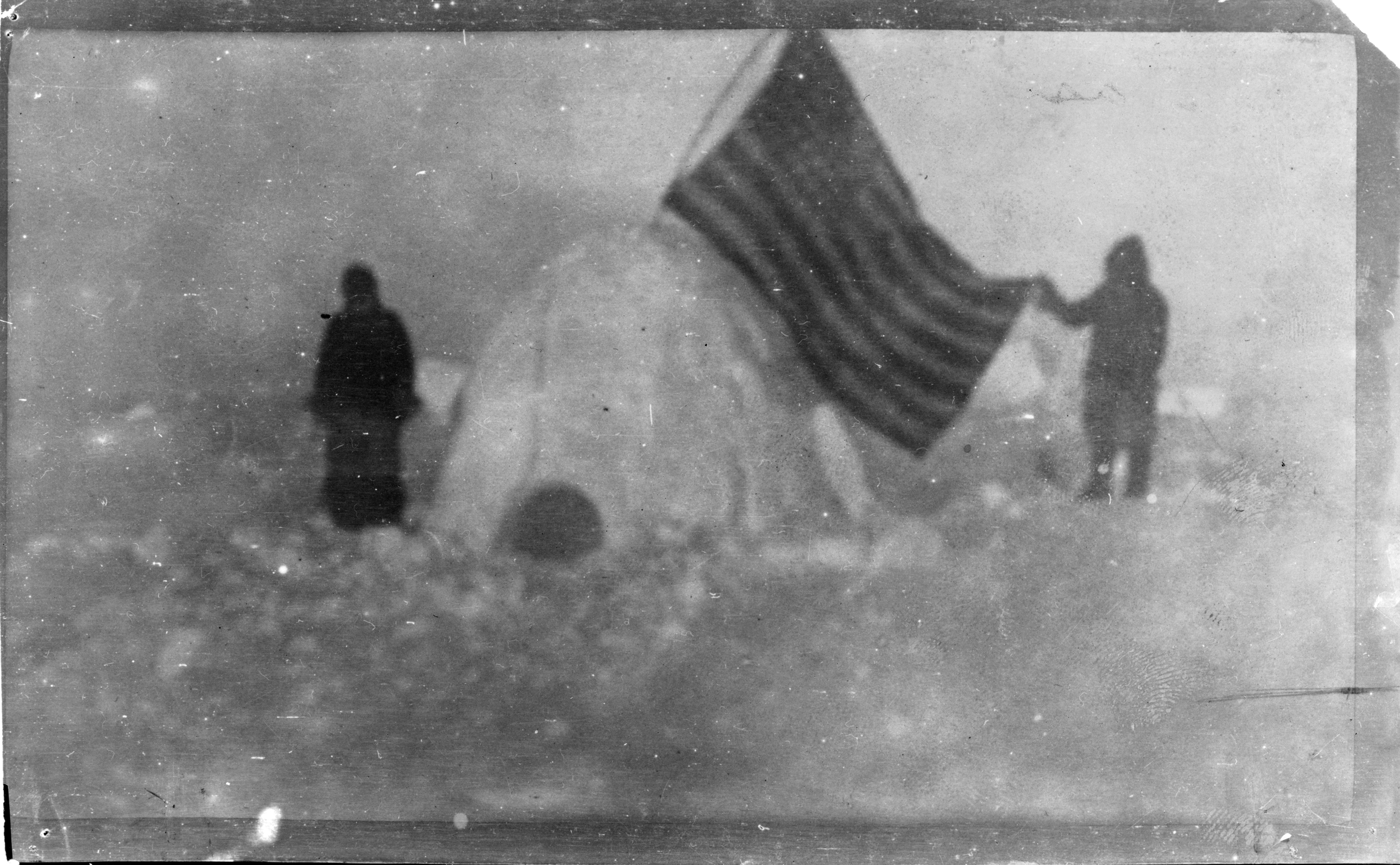
Photo allegedly taken at, or near, the North Pole

Cook returned to the Arctic in 1907. He planned to attempt to reach the North Pole, although he did not announce his intention until August 1907, when he was already in the Arctic. He left Annoatok, a small settlement in the north of Greenland, in February 1908. Cook claimed that he reached the pole on April 21, 1908, after traveling north from Axel Heiberg Island, taking with him only two Inuit men, Ahpellah and Etukishook. On the journey south, he claimed to have been cut off from his intended route to Annoatok by open water. Living off local game, his party was forced to push south to Jones Sound, spending the open water season and part of the winter on Devon Island. From there they traveled north, eventually crossing Nares Strait to Annoatok on the Greenland side in the spring of 1909. They said they almost died of starvation during the journey.

Cook and his two companions were gone from Annoatok for 14 months, and their whereabouts in that period is a matter of intense controversy. In the view of Canadian historian Pierre Berton (Berton, 2001), Cook's story of his trek around the Arctic islands is probably legitimate. Other writers have relied on later accounts told by Cook's companions to investigators, who seemed to present another view.

There are similarities between Ahpellah and Etukishook's sketched route of their journey south, and the route taken by the fictional shipwrecked explorers in Jules Verne's novel The Adventures of Captain Hatteras. For example, the route the two Inuit traced on a map goes over both the Pole of Cold and the wintering site of the fictional expedition. Both expeditions went to the same area of Jones Sound in hopes of finding a whaling ship to take them to civilization.

Cook's claim was initially widely believed, but it was disputed by Cook's rival polar explorer Robert Peary, who claimed to have reached the North Pole in April 1909. Cook initially congratulated Peary for his achievement, but Peary and his supporters launched a campaign to discredit Cook. They enlisted the aid of socially prominent people outside the field of science, such as football coach Fielding H. Yost (as related in Fred Russell's 1943 book, I'll Go Quietly).

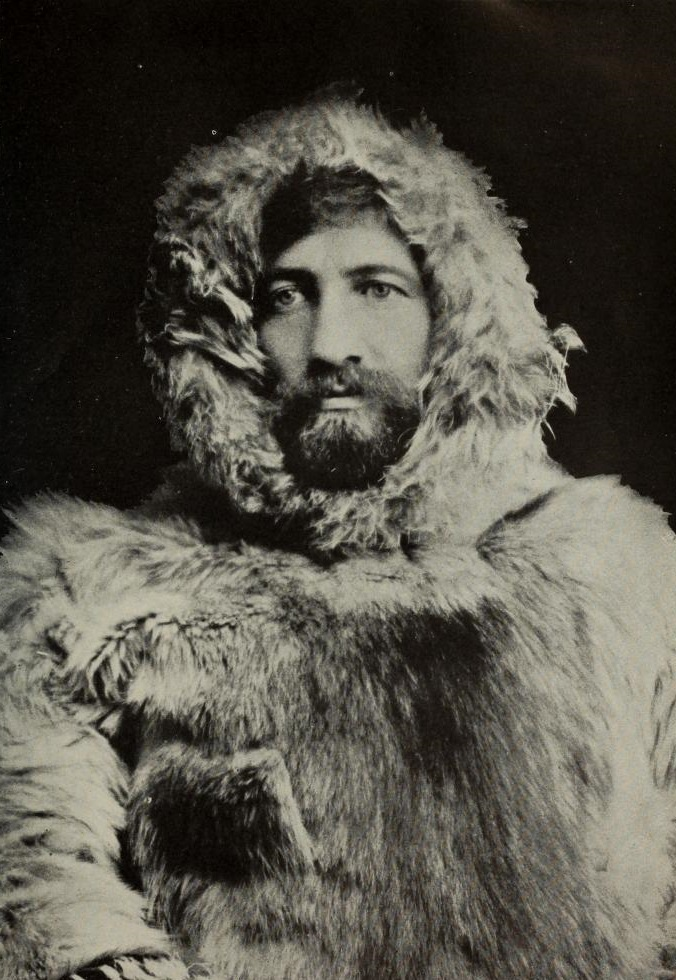
Cook in Arctic gear

Cook never produced detailed original navigational records to substantiate his claim to have reached the North Pole. He said that his detailed records were part of his belongings, contained in three boxes, which he left at Annoatok in April 1909. He had left them with Harry Whitney, an American hunter who had traveled to Greenland with Peary the previous year due to the lack of manpower for a second sledge-journey 700 miles (1,100 km) south to Upernavik. When Whitney tried to bring Cook's boxes with him on his return to the US on Peary's ship Roosevelt in 1909, Peary refused to allow them on board. As a result, Whitney left Cook's boxes in a cache in Greenland. They were never found.

On December 21, 1909, a commission at the University of Copenhagen, after having examined evidence submitted by Cook, ruled that his records did not contain proof that the explorer reached the Pole. (Peary refused to submit his records for review by such a third party, and for decades the National Geographic Society, which held his papers, refused researchers access to them.)

Cook intermittently claimed he had kept copies of his sextant navigational data, and in 1911 published some. These have an incorrect solar diameter. Ahwelah and Etukishook, Cook's Inuit companions, gave seemingly conflicting details about where they had gone with him. The major conflicts have been resolved in the light of improved geographical knowledge. Whitney was convinced that they had reached the North Pole with Cook, but was reluctant to be drawn into the controversy.

The Peary expedition's people (primarily Matthew Henson, who had a working knowledge of Inuit, and George Borup, who did not) claimed that Ahwelah and Etukishook told them they had traveled only a few days from land. A map allegedly was drawn by Ahwelaw and Etukishook that correctly located and accurately depicted then-unknown Meighen Island, which strongly suggests that they visited it as they claimed. Canadian Vilhjalmur Stefansson's expedition in 1916 later landed on Meighen Island; Stefansson later read Cook's papers and agreed that Meighen Island was a Cook discovery. It is known as the only island to be discovered by a United States expedition in the North American arctic. For more detail see Bryce (1997) and Henderson (2005).

The conflicting claims of Cook and Peary prompted Roald Amundsen to take extensive precautions in navigation during his South Pole expedition so there could be no doubt concerning attainment of the pole if successful. Amundsen also had the advantage of traveling over a continent. He left unmistakable evidence of his presence at the South Pole, whereas any ice on which Cook might or might not have camped would have drifted many miles in the year between the competing claims.

At the end of his 1911 memoir, Cook wrote: "I have stated my case, presented my proofs. As to the relative merits of my claim, and Mr. Peary's, place the two records side by side. Compare them. I shall be satisfied with your decision."

== Reputation ==
Cook's reputation never recovered from the attacks on his claim. While Peary's North Pole claim was widely accepted for most of the 20th century, it has since been discredited by a variety of reviewers, including the National Geographic Society, which long supported him. Cook spent the next few years defending his claim and threatening to sue writers who said that he had faked the trip.

Researching the complicated story of the conflicting claims, the writer Robert Bryce began to assess how the men's personalities and goals were in contrast, and evaluated them against the period of the Gilded Age. He believes that Cook, as a physician and ethnographer, cared about the people on his expedition and admired the Inuit. Bryce writes that Cook "genuinely loved and hungered for the real meat of exploration—mapping new routes and shorelines, learning and adapting to the survival techniques of the Eskimos, advancing his own knowledge—and that of the world—for its own sake." But, he could not find supporters to help finance the expeditions without a goal that was more flashy. There was tremendous pressure on each man to be the first to reach the Pole, in order to gain financial support for continued expeditions.

=== Fraud trial ===
In 1919, Cook started promoting startup oil companies in Fort Worth. In April 1923, Cook and 24 other Fort Worth oil promoters were indicted in a federal crackdown on fraudulent oil company promotions. Three of Cook's employees pleaded guilty, but Cook insisted on his innocence and went to trial. Also tried was his head advertising copywriter, S. E. J. Cox, who had been previously convicted of mail fraud in connection with his own oil company promotions.

Among other deceptive practices, Cook was charged with paying dividends from stock sales, rather than from profits. Cook's attorney was former politician Joseph Weldon Bailey, who clashed frequently with the judge. The jury found Cook guilty on 14 counts of fraud. In November 1923, Judge Killits sentenced Cook and 13 other oil company promoters to prison terms. Cook drew the longest sentence, 14 years 9 months. His attorney appealed the verdict, but the conviction was upheld.

== Later life ==
Cook was imprisoned at Leavenworth until 1930. Roald Amundsen, who believed he owed his life to Cook's extrication of the Belgica, visited him in prison at least once. Cook was pardoned by President Franklin D. Roosevelt in 1940, ten years after his release and shortly before his death of a cerebral hemorrhage on August 5. He was interred at the Chapel of Forest Lawn Cemetery in Buffalo, New York.

== Popular culture ==
- "Erchie Explains the Polar Situation", a satirical account of the rival claims of Cook and Peary by Neil Munro, first published in the Glasgow Evening News of 4 October 1909.
- Cook & Peary: The Race to the Pole (1983) – American TV movie
- The Last Place on Earth (1985) – British miniseries
- The Navigator of New York (2003) – Novel by Wayne Johnston
- La jaula de los onas (2021) - Novel by Carlos Gamerro
- Madhouse at the End of the Earth: The Belgica’s Journey into the Dark Antarctic Night (2021) by Julian Sancton
- A Tree Grows in Brooklyn by Betty Smith Chapter 25 (1943)
- Cautionary Tales with Tim Harford - Poles Apart: How a journalist divided a city (2025) by Tim Harford, BBC Sounds

== Works by Cook ==
- Through the First Antarctic Night 1898-1899; a Narrative of the Voyage of the "Belgica" Among Newly Discovered Lands and Over an Unknown Sea About the South Pole. London: William Heinemann. 1900.
- To The Top of the Continent; Discovery, Exploration and Adventure in Sub-Arctic Alaska. New York: Doubleday. 1908.
- My Attainment of the Pole: Being the Record of the Expedition That First Reached the Boreal Center, 1907-1909. With the Final Summary of the Polar Controversy. New York & London: Mitchell Kennerley. 1911.
