= Kane Basin =

Arctic waterway lying between Greenland and Canada

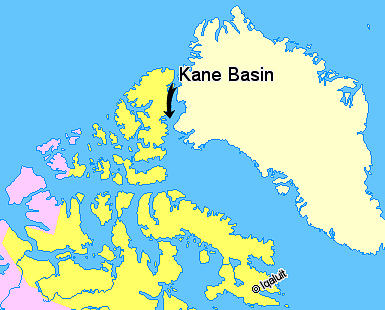
- Kane Basin, Nunavut, Canada. Nunavut Greenland Northwest Territories

- Location within Nunavut
- Location: Smith Sound / Kennedy Channel
- Coordinates: 79°04′30″N 73°05′10″W
- Ocean/sea sources: Arctic Ocean
- Basin countries: Canada, Greenland
- Max. length: 170 km (110 mi)
- Max. width: 124 km (77 mi)
- Surface area: 27,000 km^{2} (10,000 sq mi)
- Settlements: Uninhabited

Kane Basin (Danish: Kane Bassin; French: Bassin (de) Kane) is an Arctic waterway lying between Greenland and Ellesmere Island, Canada's northernmost. It links Smith Sound to Kennedy Channel and forms part of Nares Strait. It is approximately 170 km (110 mi) in length and 240 km (150 mi) at its widest and has a surface area of about 27,000 km^{2} (10,000 sq mi).

It is named after the American explorer Elisha Kent Kane, whose expedition in search of Franklin's lost expedition crossed it in 1854. Kane himself had named it "Peabody Bay," in honour of philanthropist George Peabody, who provided the major funding for Kane's expedition. Currently Peabody Bay is a bay at the eastern side of the basin, off the southwestern end of the Humboldt Glacier in northern Greenland.

== Settlements ==
No active settlements are on Kane Basin today, although on the side facing Ellesmere Island a Royal Canadian Mounted Police outpost was established at Bache Peninsula in 1926. It was abandoned in 1933. The side facing Greenland (Inglefield Land and southern Washington Land) also used to have several active settlements, but were been abandoned in the 20th century. Etah lies at the northern end of Baffin Bay about 25 km (16 mi) south of Kane Basin in Foulk Fjord near Smith Sound, while Annoatok lies near the boundaries of Smith Sound and Kane Basin.
