= Annoatok =

Former hunting station in Greenland

Location within Greenland

Annoatok or Anoritooq, located at 78°32′44.1″N 72°08′57.5″W, was a small hunting station in Inglefield Land, northwest Greenland, near Cape Inglefield which is between the boundaries of Smith Sound and Kane Basin, about 25 km (16 mi) north of Etah. It is now abandoned.

== History ==
According to the explorer Knud Rasmussen’s accounts of local oral history, Annoatok had been uninhabited for about fifty years prior to 1916, placing its abandonment as a permanent settlement around 1866. It was re-occupied in 1925 as a winter settlement with 11 inhabitants, although it has been uninhabited since then.

Annoatok was used as a base by Frederick Cook during his Arctic expedition of 1908–09, when he claimed to have reached the North Pole. The name Annoatok means "the wind-loved place". According to a publication in 1997, it was the most northerly inhabited place on Earth at that time. However, excavations carried out by Erik Holtved in Inuarfissuaq at 78.9° N in central Inglefield Land proved human settlement further north. Excavations during the years 2004 to 2005 gave evidence of an ancient settlement about 30 km (19 mi) further north in Qaqaitsut at 79.2° N in eastern Inglefield Land. Qaqaitsut was briefly re-occupied by at least four Inughuit families in the mid-1980s.
