= Fake Peak =

Outcrop near Ruth Glacier, Denali National Park

Coordinates: 62°54′17.5″N 150°30′22″W

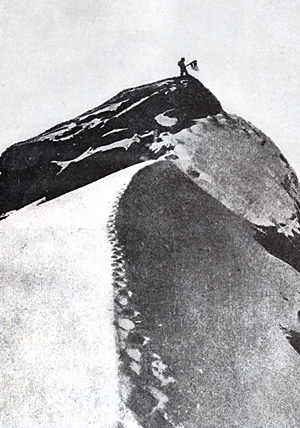
- Cook's claimed photograph of the summit of Denali, actually taken at Fake Peak in 1906

Highest point
- Elevation: 5,338 ft (1,627 m)

Geography
- Location within Alaska
- Location: Denali National Park and Preserve, Alaska, United States

Fake Peak is a small outcrop on a ridge beside the Ruth Glacier in Denali National Park and Preserve in Alaska, US, 19 miles southeast of the summit of Denali. It has been shown by Robert M. Bryce that the "summit photograph" produced by Frederick Cook as evidence supporting his claim to have made the first ascent of Denali was taken on Fake Peak. At 5,338 feet (1,627 m), this is almost 15,000 feet (4,600 m) lower than the true summit of Denali.
