= Hiawatha Glacier =

Glacier in northwestern Greenland

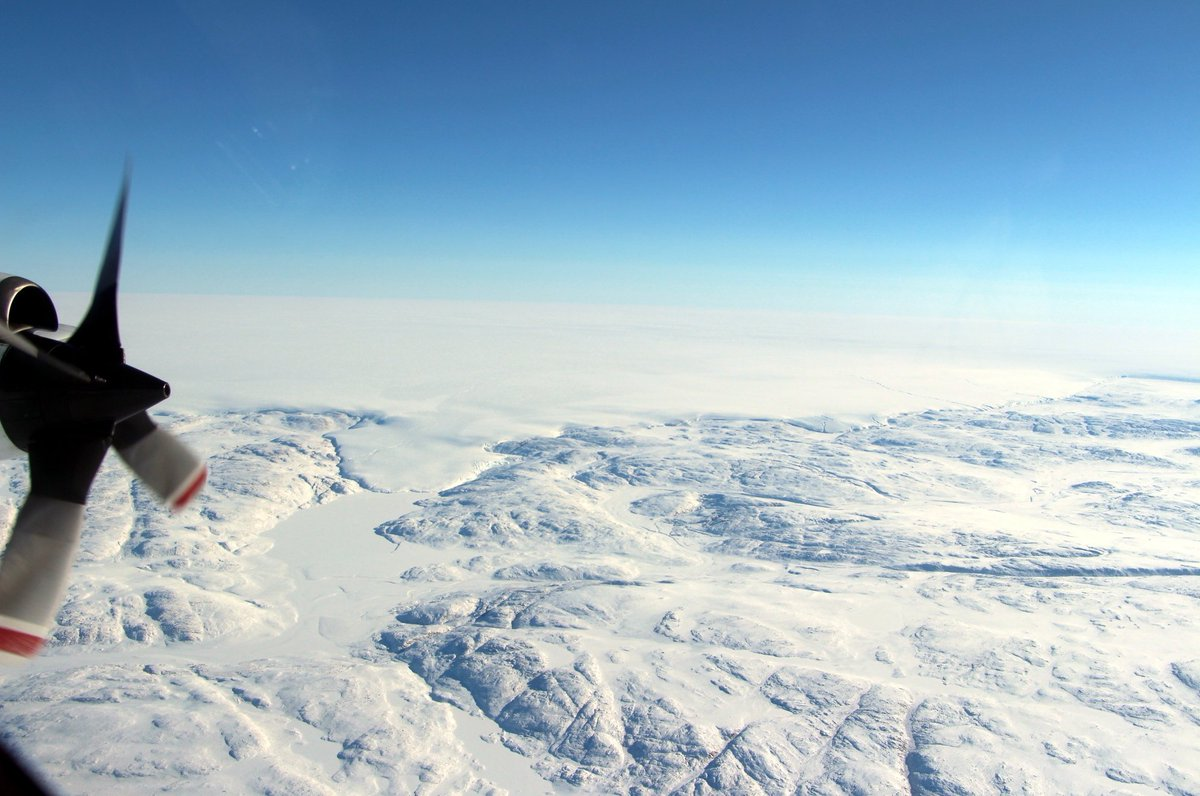
- Land-terminating Hiawatha Glacier (left-center) emerging from its semicircular parent ice lobe, in NW Greenland
- Interactive map of Hiawatha Glacier
- Coordinates: 78°49′N 67°01′W

Hiawatha Glacier is a glacier in northwest Greenland, with its terminus in Inglefield Land. It was mapped in 1917 by Lauge Koch, who noted that the glacier tongue extended into Septembersøerne (September Lakes). Hiawatha Glacier attracted attention in 2018 because of the discovery of a crater beneath the surface of the ice sheet in the area. A publication noted in 1952 that Hiawatha Glacier had been retreating since 1920. It was named after Hiawatha, a 16th-century native American leader.

== Probable impact structure ==
Two views of the Hiawatha crater region—one covered by the Greenland Ice Sheet, the other showing the topography of the rock beneath the ice sheet, including the crater

The proposed impact structure was identified using airborne radar surveys that showed the presence of a 31 km wide crater-like depression in the bedrock beneath the ice. Shocked quartz grains and melt rock clasts have been found in fluvio-glacial sediments deposited by a river that drains the area of the structure. The timing of the impact has been dated using argon–argon dating and uranium–lead dating of zircon crystals within the melt rock to 57.99 ± 0.54 million years ago, during the late Paleocene.

From an interpretation of the crystalline nature of the underlying rock, together with chemical analysis of sediment washed from the crater, the impactor was argued to be a type of iron asteroid with a diameter in the order of 1.5 kilometres (0.9 mi). If an impact origin for the crater is confirmed, it would be one of the twenty-five largest known impact craters on Earth.

== See also ==
- List of possible impact structures on Earth
- Bølling–Allerød warming
- Operation IceBridge
