= Eigil Knuth =

Danish explorer

- Born: Eigil Knuth; 8 August 1903; Klampenborg, Denmark
- Died: 12 March 1996 (aged 92); Copenhagen, Denmark
- Resting place: Bispebjerg Cemetery, in Copenhagen
- Known for: Explorer, archaeologist, sculptor and writer
- Title: Count

Count Eigil Knuth (8 August 1903 – 12 March 1996) was a Danish explorer, archaeologist, sculptor and writer. He is referred to as the Nestor ('elder statesman') of Danish polar explorers. His archaeological investigations were made in Peary Land and adjacent areas of High Arctic Greenland. Knuth was made a Knight of the Dannebrog.

== Early life ==
Eigil Knuth was born on 8 August 1903 in Klampenborg, near Copenhagen, Denmark. He was born into the Danish noble Knuth family. His father, Count Eigil Valdemar Knuth, was a military officer and captain, and his mother was Marie Dijmphna Johanne Emma de Pasqualin Gámel. His paternal grandparents were the postmaster Adam Vilhelm Frederik Knuth and Annette Marie Haxthausen-Abbenburg of the Westphalian noble house Haxthausen. On his mother's side he was the grandson of the Danish businessman Augustinus Gámel and the philanthropist Emma Gámel (née Hellerung).

Knuth's childhood was linked symbolically to the history of Arctic exploration. In 1888, the Norwegian explorer Fridtjof Nansen became the first person to cross the Greenland ice sheet, an expedition partly financed by Knuth's maternal grandfather Augustinus Gámel. After the expedition Nansen gave Gámel the compass he had carried during the crossing as a token of gratitude for his support. Gámel later presented the compass to his grandson as a birth gift. Knuth later described the object as an early inspiration for his lifelong fascination with Greenland and the Arctic.

Knuth attended Østre Borgerdyd Gymnasium in Copenhagen. After completing school in 1921, he spent a year at a technical school to qualify for admission to the Royal Danish Academy of Fine Arts. From 1922 to 1924, he studied architecture there before turning to painting and sculpture under the sculptors Henning Schiøler and Kai Nielsen.

During the 1920s Knuth travelled widely in Europe on a traditional Grand Tour. While staying in Val Gardena in northern Italy in 1926 and again in 1928 he studied woodcarving. During this period he also published his first book, Kunst og Liv (1927), a philosophical work reflecting his interest in the ideas of the Danish philosopher Søren Kierkegaard.

After returning to Denmark, he enrolled at the gymnastics folk high school founded by Niels Bukh in Ollerup. In 1932, he completed his training there and qualified as a gymnastics instructor.

== Career ==
Knuth's first trip to Greenland occurred in 1932, accompanying Aage Roussel from the National Museum of Denmark on an archaeological dig to excavate old Norse sites on West Greenland's coast. Knuth spent the next two years as an art critic for the Copenhagen newspaper Dagens Nyheder.

Assisting Roussell and Poul Nørlund during the summer of 1934, Knuth excavated old Norse ruins at Igaliko. In 1935, Helge Larsen, Ebbe Munck, and Knuth, as archaeologist, assisted on the Augustine Courtauld Expedition to East Greenland, during which Gunnbjørn Fjeld, Greenland's highest mountain, was climbed. The following summer, in 1936, Knuth, Robert Gessain, and Michel Perez participated in the French Trans-Greenland Expedition under Paul-Emile Victor, crossing the Greenland inlandsis (ice cap), starting at Christianshåb in the west, and ending at Tasiilaq/Angmagsalik, an Inuit settlement in the east. It was here that Knuth worked as a sculptor, producing a notable series of busts of the local Inuit.

Knuth financed the bulk of his next expedition, the Danish Northeast Greenland Expedition, also known as the 'Danish Northeast Greenland Expedition 1938—39, sent out by Alf Trolle, Ebbe Munck, and Eigil Knuth in memory of the Denmark Expedition' (Danish: Dansk Nordgrønlandsekspedition 1938—39, udsendt af Alf Trolle, Ebbe Munck og Eigil Knuth til Minde on Danmark-Ekspeditionen), arriving in Greenland with his co-leader and friend, Ebbe Munck, on 19 June 1938. The crew consisted of six more men, among others the botanist Paul Gelting. It was one of the first Danish Greenland expeditions to make use of an airplane, a de Havilland Tiger Moth. With the start of war, Knuth could not return to Greenland as planned, instead, becoming an announcer for Denmark Radio in the Danish resistance movement.

During the period of 1948–50, Knuth was back in Greenland and made several discoveries, including a large tool collection of the Thule culture and tool fragments of the Dorset culture. His most important contribution, however, was the first identification and demonstration of Independence I culture and Independence II culture, immigration waves of Paleo-Eskimo, spread apart by almost 3000 years. He named the cultures Independence after the Independence Fjord located in Peary Land.

=== Artist ===
In addition to sculpting, he produced paintings and watercolours. Some of his works were on display at the 1939 New York World's Fair.

== Later years ==
Knuth's Danish Peary Land Expeditions ended in 1995 with his last visit to Brønlundhus at Brønlund Fjord, which served for almost 50 years as his Peary Land expedition headquarters. He died in Copenhagen the following year and is buried at Bispebjerg Cemetery.

According to Danish historian Wilhelm von Rosen, Knuth "in his old age privately regretted that he did not at some point in his earlier life come out publicly as a homosexual".

== Legacy ==
Before his death, Knuth was unable to complete a comprehensive book summarizing his Peary Land archaeological findings. That task fell upon Bjarne Grønnow, heir to Knuth's archival information. The Northernmost Ruins of the Globe: Eigil Knuth's archaeological investigations in Peary Land and adjacent areas of High Arctic Greenland (2003) is a compilation of Knuth's findings and observations.

His portrait busts are in Nuuk.

== Awards ==
- 1951, Hans Egede Medal, Royal Danish Geographical Society
- 1952, Patron's Medal, Royal Geographical Society
- 1953, Mungo Park Medal, Royal Scottish Geographical Society
- 1979, honorary Doctor of Science degree, University of Copenhagen
- 1993, Nersornaat Gold Medal, Home Rule of Greenland

== Partial works ==
- (1927). Kunst og Liv, OCLC 38313431
- (1936). Fire Mand og Solen. : En Tur over Grönlands Indlandsis, OCLC 186735073
- (1940). Under det nordligste Dannebrog, beretning om Dansk Nordøstgrønlands ekspedition 1938—39, OCLC 1839380
- (1942). Report on the expedition and on subsequent work at the Mørkefjord Station, OCLC 251025543
- (1943). Ernst Zeuthen: 1880—1938, OCLC 16916718
- (1943). Billedhugger i Angmagssalik, OCLC 31103011
- (1945). Tanker ved tingene, OCLC 11580030
- (1948). Sommerrejsen til Pearyland, OCLC 13624744
- (1958). Det mystiske X i Danmark fjord, OCLC 10856612
- (1960). Aron of Kangeq: 1822—1869 : The seal hunter who became father of Greenland's art of painting, OCLC 61075103
- (1964). Rapport over Den 3die Peary Land Ekspedition: sommeren 1964, OCLC 45432772
- (1967). Archaeology of the Musk-ox way, OCLC 185867987
- (1967). Thai-Danish Prehistoric Expedition 1960-62 : Archaeological excavations in Thailand, OCLC 220587733
- (1973). Kap Harald Moltke (82⁰09'23"N., 29⁰53'00"W.) : Jørgen Brønlund Fjord, Peary Land: [rapport], OCLC 70279288
- (1980). Umiaq'en fra Peary Land, OCLC 7615402
- (1995). Uafhængighed : hundeslæderejsens filosofi = Kiffaanngissuseq: qimussimik angalanerup isumaliutersuutai = Independence: the philosophy of a dog sledge journey, OCLC 1995
- (2003). Billedhugger i Ammassalik, ISBN 87-14-29913-5
- (2009). Indépendance : la philosophie du voyage en traîneau, éditions Paulsen, Paris
- (2013). Inslandis, éditions Paulsen, Paris
