= Cape Alexander, Greenland =

Headland in Avannaata, Greenland

Cape Alexander Ullersuaq, Uvdlerssuak, Sarfalik
- Cape
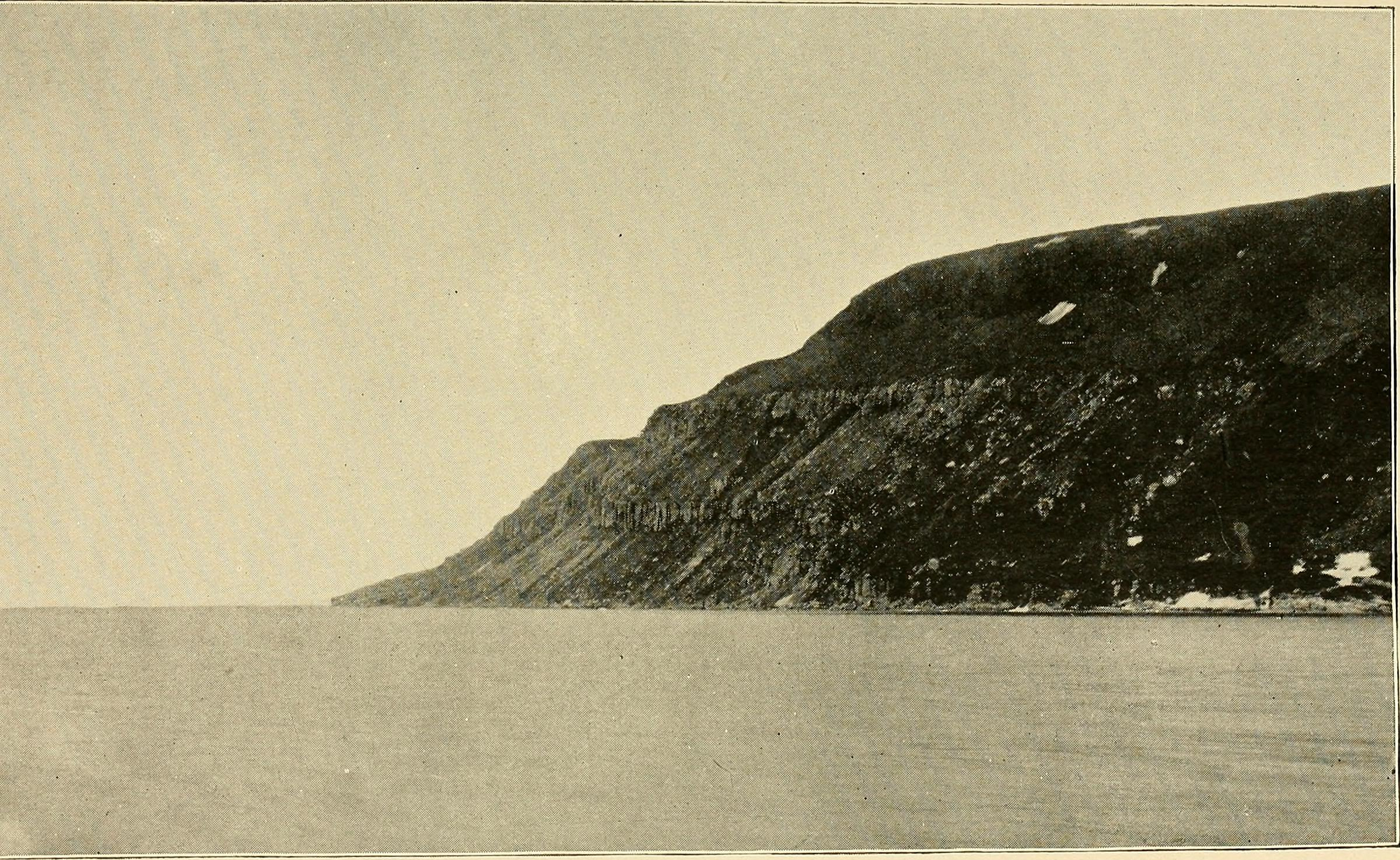
- View of Cape Alexander

- Location within Greenland
- Coordinates: 78°11′N 73°3′W
- Location: Avannaata, Greenland
- Water bodies: Baffin Bay

Area
  - Total: Arctic

Cape Alexander (Greenlandic: Ullersuaq, also Uvdlerssuak and Sarfalik; Danish: Kap Alexander) is a headland in the Baffin Bay, northwest Greenland, Avannaata municipality. It is one of the important landmarks of Greenland.

== History ==
The cape was first sighted by the English navigator William Baffin in 1616. The cape was named by John Ross after his ship, Alexander, in 1818.

== Geography ==
Cape Alexander is located in Prudhoe Land, at the western end of Hartstene Bay with the Dodge Glacier to the east and the Storm Glacier to the southeast. This headland is the westernmost point of the island of Greenland.

Sutherland Island (Tigssarfik) lies 5 km (3.1 mi) off the shore to the southeast. The small Carey Islands are located further to the west; among them Nordvestø (73°10'W), the westernmost point of Greenland as a territory.

Ullersuaq amongst the extreme points of Greenland
