= Etah, Greenland =

Etah
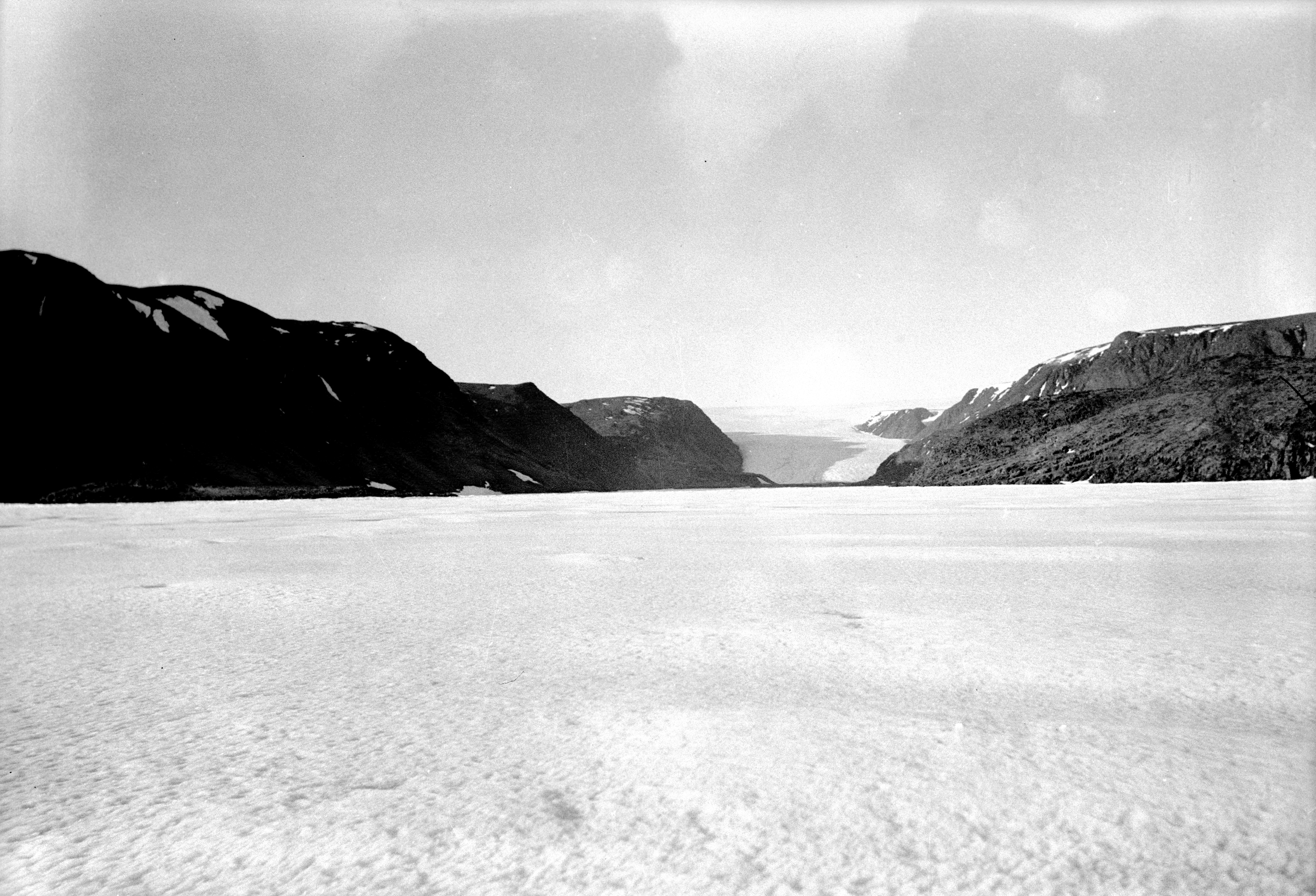
- Brother John's Glacier as seen from Foulke Fjord near Etah in Spring, 1938

- Location within Greenland
- Coordinates: 78°18′50″N 72°36′35″W
- Sovereign state: Kingdom of Denmark
- Autonomous country: Greenland
- Municipality: Avannaata
- Time zone: UTC-2:00 (Western Greenland Time)
  - Summer (DST): UTC-1:00 (Western Greenland Summer Time)

Etah is an abandoned settlement in the Avannaata municipality in northern Greenland. It was a starting point of discovery expeditions to the North Pole and the landing site of the last migration of the Inuit from the Canadian Arctic.

== Geography ==
The village was located on the shores of Foulk Fjord near Reindeer Point in Inglefield Land. The fjord is about 2.4 kilometres (1.5 mi) wide and several kilometres long with 610 m (2,000 ft) cliffs on each side. Brother John's Glacier terminates at the eastern end of the fjord. At the foot of the glacier is Lake Alida, a small body of frozen fresh water. The northern end of Baffin Bay west of the former village, narrowing into Nares Strait between Greenland and Ellesmere Island, is usually frozen from October to July.

== History ==
=== Last migration to Greenland ===
Etah lies on the ancient migration route from the north of the Canadian Arctic with several waves of ancient migrants passing through the area from the northbound Independence I and Independence II cultures 4,400 and 2,700 years ago, respectively, to the southbound Thule culture migrants less than a thousand years ago.

It is also the point where the last migration of the Inuit from Baffin Island reached the coast of Greenland in 1865. An Inuk shaman (Greenlandic: angakok) named Qidlaq led the migrants from Baffin Island alongside the coast of Ellesmere Island for seven years, crossing the strait to Etah. The group split there, with some returning to Pond Inlet in Canada at a cost of many lives. Inhabitants of Pituffik, later relocated to Qaanaaq, are partially descended from this last group of Arctic migrants to Greenland.

=== 20th century ===
Etah was used in the past as a base camp for several Arctic expeditions, including Knud Rasmussen's expeditions to the northern coast of Greenland, Robert Peary's failed attempts at the North Pole, the ill-fated Crocker Land Expedition of 1913, the Humphrey Expedition of 1934–35, the MacGregor Arctic Expedition in 1937–38, and the Haig Thomas Expedition of 1938. Descendants of Peary and the local Inuit still live in Qaanaaq.

Etah was once the most-northerly populated settlement in the world, while Annoatok, located approximately 25 km (16 mi) to the north, was only a seasonally-occupied hunting camp. The village was abandoned in 1953 with the Inuit moving south to Pituffik due to the harsh climate. In 1984, a group of Greenlanders from Qaanaaq moved to Etah in an attempt to repopulate the village. The attempt failed, with the hunters unable to support themselves and their families with income from animal hides, as well as their inability to sever connections with the settled life and the amenities of Qaanaaq.

The huts of the former village are still standing. Today, Etah is seldom visited except by occasional hunter visitors in the summertime because of an abundance of walruses and polar bears.
