= Smith Sound =

Arctic sea passage between Greenland and Canada

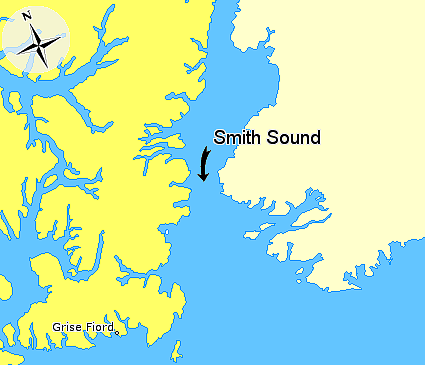
- Smith Sound, Nunavut, Canada. Nunavut (mostly Ellesmere Island) Greenland

- Location within Nunavut
- Coordinates: 78°25′N 74°00′W
- Ocean/sea sources: Kane Basin / Baffin Bay
- Basin countries: Canada, Greenland
- Max. length: 50 km (31 mi)
- Max. width: 40 km (25 mi)
- Frozen: Most of the year
- Islands: Pim Island, Littleton Island
- Settlements: Uninhabited

Smith Sound (Danish: Smith Sund; French: Détroit de Smith) is an Arctic sea passage between Greenland and Nunavut's northernmost island, Ellesmere Island. It links Baffin Bay with Kane Basin and forms part of the Nares Strait. On the Canadian side it extends from Cape Sabine in the north to Cape Isabella in the south.

On the Greenland side of the sound were the now abandoned settlements of Etah and Annoatok.

== History ==
The first known visit to the area by Europeans was in 1616 when the Discovery, captained by Robert Bylot and piloted by William Baffin, sailed into this region. The sound was originally named Sir Thomas Smith's Bay after the English diplomat Sir Thomas Smythe. By the 1750s it regularly appeared on maps as Sir Thomas Smith's Sound, though no further exploration of the area would be recorded until John Ross' 1818 expedition. By this time it had begun to be known simply as Smith Sound.

In 1852 Edward Augustus Inglefield penetrated a little further than Baffin, establishing a new furthest north in North America.
