= Independence I culture =

Paleo-Eskimo culture of northern Greenland

Areas of Independence I and Independence II cultures around Independence Fjord

Independence I was a culture of Paleo-Eskimos who lived in northern Greenland and the Canadian Arctic, some time between 2400 and 1900 BC. There has been much debate among scholars on when Independence I culture disappeared, and, therefore, there is a margin of uncertainty with the dates.

The culture is named after Independence Fjord, which is a fjord located in Inutoqqat Nunaat (formerly Peary Land). The Independence I people lived at the same time as the Saqqaq culture of southern Greenland. Independence I culture was followed by Independence II culture, which had a similar geographical extent, and lasted from the 8th century BC, roughly 600 years after the disappearance of Independence I. The Independence I occupation of northern Greenland appears to have been much more extensive than that of Independence II.

Independence I alongside Saqqaq culture are considered to be the earliest known cultures in Greenland. The first Palaeo-Eskimo migrants are thought to have migrated from the Canadian High Arctic and have a connection to the Arctic small tool tradition.

Radiocarbon dates and typologies of dwellings and tools do not allow distinguishing any chronological changes in the Independence I culture over its long existence.

The topography of the area that the Independence I people resided was extreme and therefore their dwellings reflected this with a focus on keeping warm. Independence I dwellings were characterised by mid passages and a central hearth. The tools they used were also distinct from other cultures from the same era especially the use of microblades. The extreme conditions of the region restricted Independence I people's diet to mainly muskox.

The Independence I culture disappeared around 1900–1700 BC for unknown reasons. Scientists have considerably debated the reasons for why Independence I and II emerged in the isolated northeastern part of Greenland, as well as how these cultures flourished and disappeared.

Danish explorer Eigil Knuth first recognised the existence of both Independence I and II.

Eigil Knuth's intensive archaeological investigations led to numerous sites being concluded as Independence I which was confirmed by later archaeologists and researchers. However, Aasivitoqarsuaq (formerly Pearylandville), Adam C. Knuth site and Deltaterasserne are considered to be the biggest settlements and most likely where the Independence I people spent longer periods of time. These sites contained ruins of the dwelling that Independence I people resided in giving an insight into how they survived the extreme temperatures of the High Arctic.

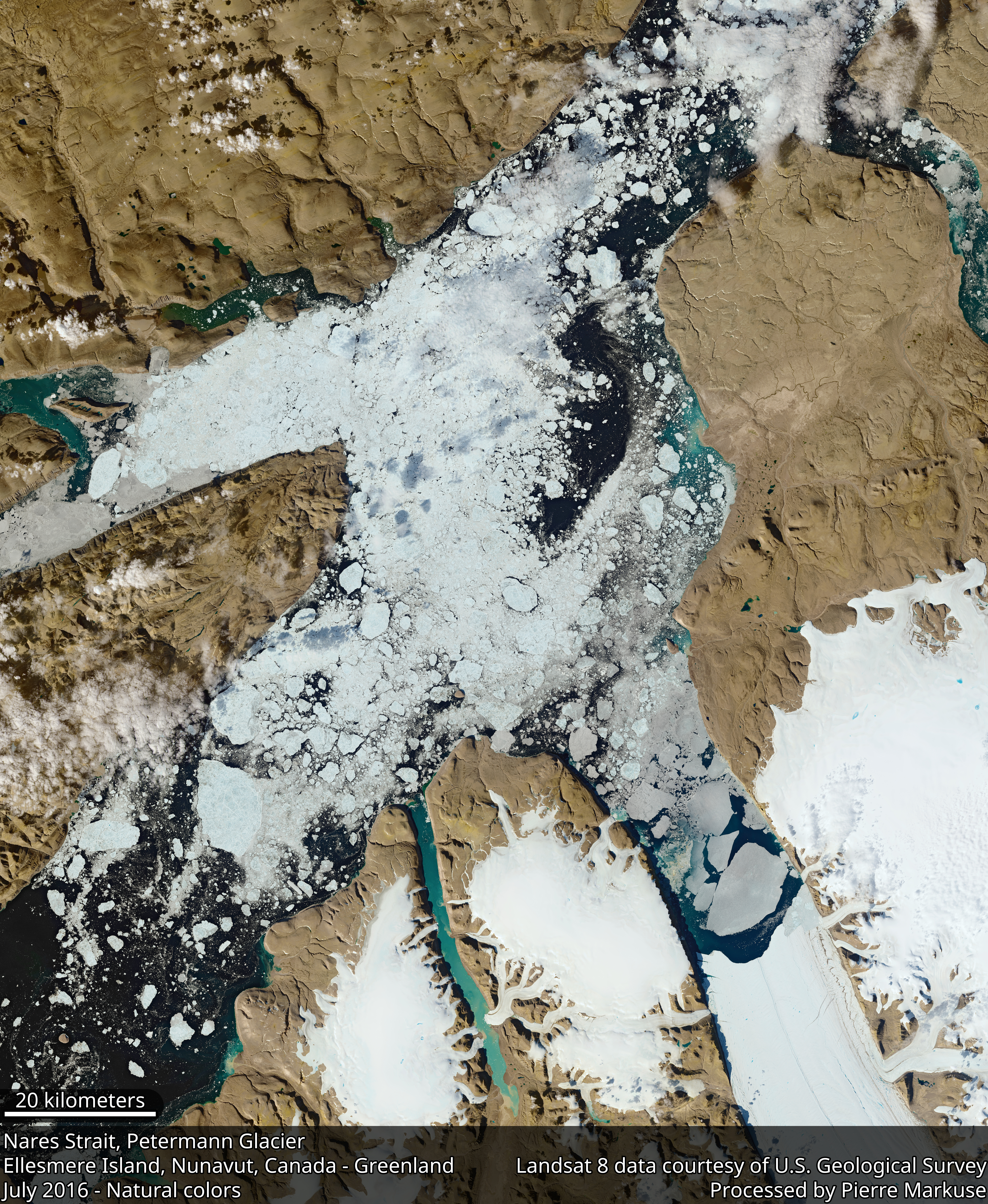
Nares Strait 432 pan crop 15 (31649014854)

== History and origin ==
The earliest known culture in Northern Greenland, Independence I existed from around 2500 BC to 1900 BC. It coexisted with Saqqaq culture in Southern Greenland which existed from 2500 BC to 800 BC. Unlike Saqqaq culture, Independence I culture was fairly short lived. After Independence I culture disappeared, Independence II culture appeared.

Greenland did not have human inhabitants until remarkably late because of its geographical position restricting human access. Using traditional means of transport, Greenland could only be accessed through High Arctic Canada or by crossing the Nares Strait, which is considered to be one of the most extreme environments. Once Greenland was reached by human inhabitants, they spread into other regions of Greenland quite quickly and Greenland was settled through a short series of migrations. Archaeologists estimate the initial migration occurred around 2500 BC and they continued to migrate to Greenland through to around 2000 BC/1900 BC. They migrated mainly to the northernmost part of Greenland, around Inutoqqat Nunaat.

== Discovery ==
In September 1948, Danish explorer Eigil Knuth discovered Deltaterrasserne, a pre-Inuit archaeological site on Inutoqqat Nunaat, during the second summer of a multi-year research expedition. At Deltaterrasserne, Knuth saw evidence of human occupation and artefacts that were different to Inuit cultures, and it was concluded that what he had found was a pre-Inuit culture. Knuth named it Independence culture after Independence fjord which was a significant landmark in the Inutoqqat Nunaat. Later, Knuth divided Independence culture into Independence I and Independence II based on results from radiocarbon datings and differences in lithic tools. Further archaeological investigations and radiocarbon dates have confirmed Knuth's discoveries about the age of the Palaeo-Eskimo sites and that there was a division between the two Independence cultures.

== Topography ==
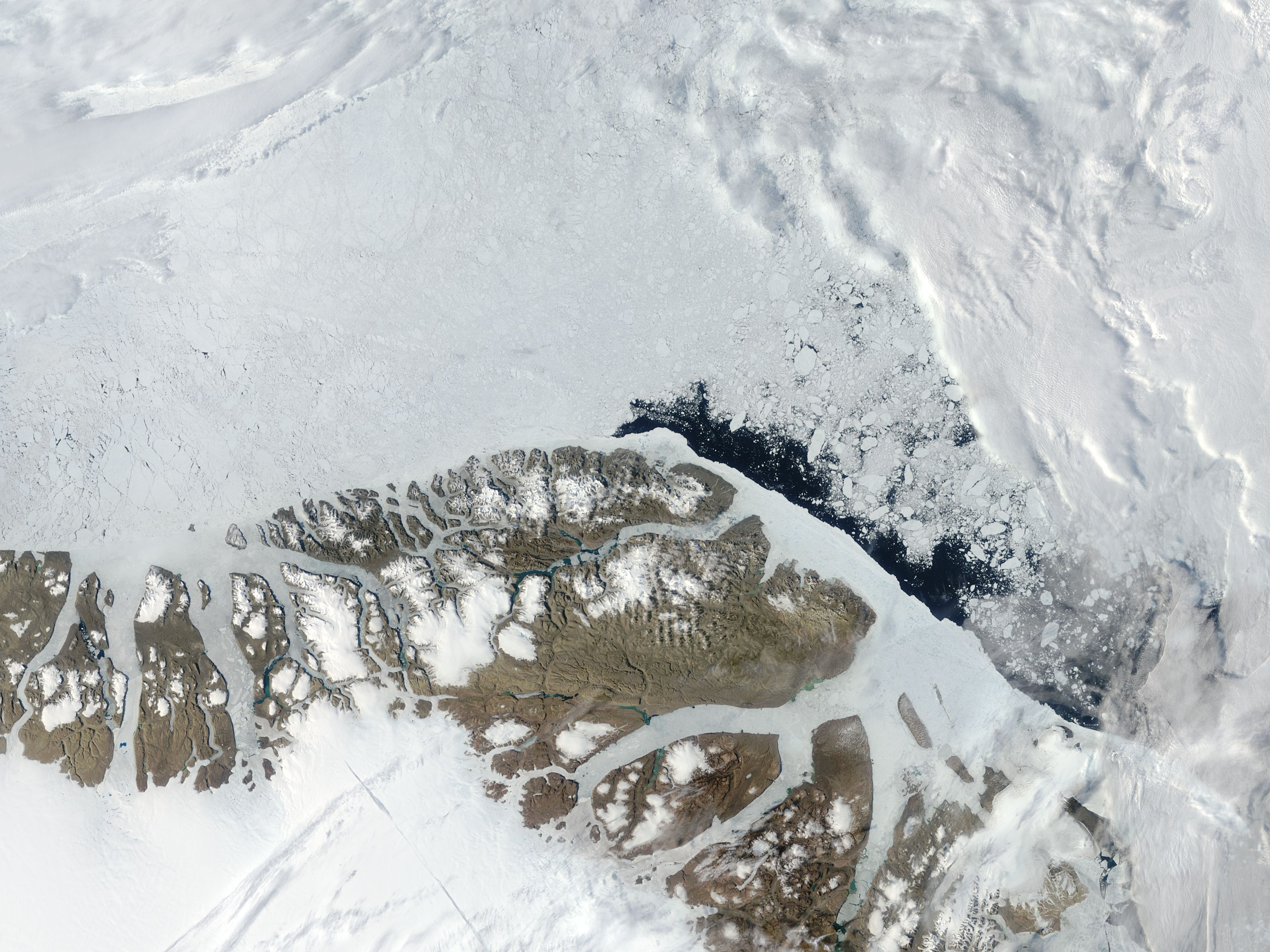
NASA image of northern Inutoqqat Nunaat (Peary Land)

The northernmost part of Greenland is characterised by "barren deserts, permanent sea- ice cover, several months of extremely low temperatures, and winter darkness". Independence I people were living in extremely remote and harsh environments and assumedly in isolation. The ecological system in Northern Greenland was unstable and was at risk of worsening environmental conditions and overhunting. This has been provided as a reason why Independence I only lasted a few centuries unlike the Saqqaq culture which migrated around the same time and lasted for almost 2000 years.

The northernmost part of Greenland is the most extreme part of the region. The midnight sun only appears one day at midsummer in the Arctic Circle. In the High Arctic the sun remains above the horizon for around two to four months each year. The coldest months of the year are lit by twilight, the aurora, and the circling moon. The warmest month of the year is only slightly above freezing, and the coldest month has an average temperature of below 30 degrees.

== Housing ==
Archaeological experiments have shown that it was possible for Independence I people to live in the High Arctic with a degree of comfort. Independence I people lived a nomadic way of life and therefore their dwellings needed to be relatively light so they could be transported easily. Independence I dwellings like other Palaeo-Eskimo dwellings during the same era generally have an emphasis on an axial element. Their dwellings were often a tent rather than house construction and access to firewood was limited. There are various Independence I dwelling types, one being the "elliptical double platform dwelling". A distinct feature in this kind of dwelling is the stone build midpassage with a box fireplace inside two parallel walls. Eigil Knuth theorised these dwellings were most likely winter dwellings and that muskox hides were potentially used to cover the floor. Another kind of dwelling linked to Independence I culture which was not part of Knuth's original research was discovered at Adam C. Knuth site. This kind of dwelling had a central fireplace with four sides. Three of the sides were surrounded by a kind of platform and the fourth side was an open space towards the entrance. The dwelling was divided into three sections: a living area on each side, the midpassage and a central hearth.

The only source of heat in these tents came from the hearth as no evidence has been found of the use of oil/blubber lamps. Some of the hearths in these dwellings were hearths in a mid-passage built within a tent ring and other hearths were box-hearths that were around 40 by 40 centimetres (16 in × 16 in) and built of slabs.

== Lifestyle ==
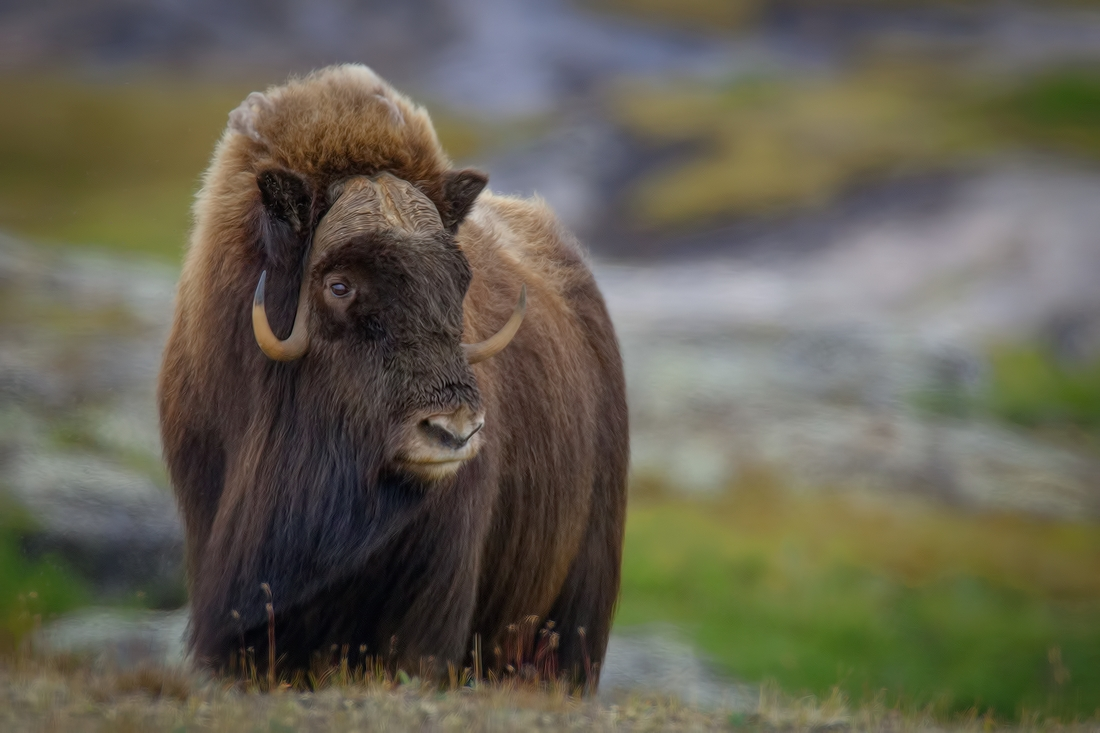
Male muskox

The Independence I culture was a hunter-gatherer culture. Remains discovered at Deltaterrasserne of muskox and fish bones suggests that Independence I people used the resources of the land and inland waters of Greenland to sustain their livelihood. Their diet was slightly different depending which site they were located at as the population of various hunting animals differed. In the Adam C. Knuth site, it was calculated that the distribution was Arctic fox (45.1%), muskox (31.6%), rock ptarmigan (7.7%), arctic char (4.4%), arctic hare (4.4%), brent goose (2.25%), and ringed seal (1.3%) This is in line with other areas apart from the high amount of arctic fox which is unusual. However, it is likely arctic fox hunting was conducted in winter, and that their diet mainly consisted of muskox which is typical for Independence I culture. Muskoxen were a key part of the Independence I culture as they used all products of the muskox. This included their meat, grease, and marrow as well as long bones for tools and their thick pelts. Therefore, Independence I people used muskoxen for food, clothing, tools, and warmth.

No clothing has been preserved from the Independence I sites. However, researchers theorise that they used finely tailored skin clothing. Fragments of broken bone needles were among the artefacts discovered at Independence I sites, which suggests they stitched their garments.

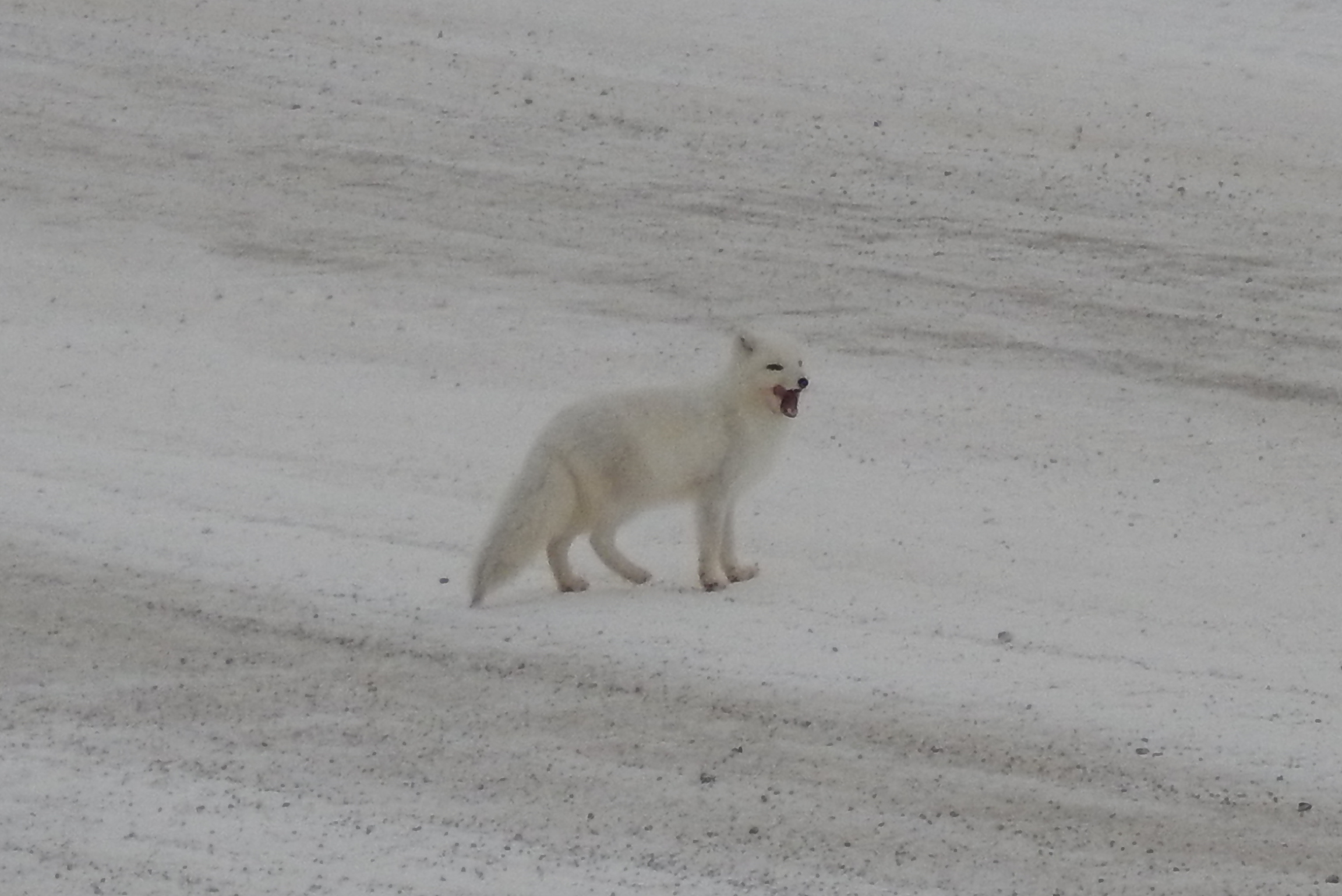
Arctic fox

== Tools ==
Only a few of the Independence I site show evidence of organic matter. However, some evidence of tools used by these people have been discovered. A few tangled harpoon heads have been recovered in some Canadian sites of Independence I however none have been found in Greenland. The tools used by Independence I people were quite distinct. Chert and "flint-like" materials were preferred for example black basalt, agate and black, blue and grey chert. End and side scrapers and large knife blades were part of their tool kit. Another marker of Independence I rather than Saqqaq, is coarsely made adze heads with ground edges of basalt.

Microblades make up a large proportion of the artefacts from Independence I sites. They were narrow slivers of glass-like flint with long straight edges and were made using very specialised techniques. The tools used by Independence I culture was an aspect of the culture's discovery. When Knuth was excavating Independence I sites, he discovered tiny, chipped tools which were razor edged microblades that did not show any resemblance to the tools of the traditional Inuit and, alongside other evidence, he used this to conclude that he had discovered a pre-Inuit culture.

== Archaeological findings ==
Over six decades, Eigil Knuth recorded over 51 Independence I sites however only a few of these sites insinuate occupation for an extended period of time rather than for a couple of seasons. These sites include Aasivitoqarsuaq (Pearylandville), Adam C. Knuth site and Deltaterasserne. The small number of significant sites can be attributed to constant abandoning of sites and moving to new hunting grounds which would provide them with better resources however, this is an unstable pattern and cannot be maintained for long periods of time in human history.

=== Significant sites ===
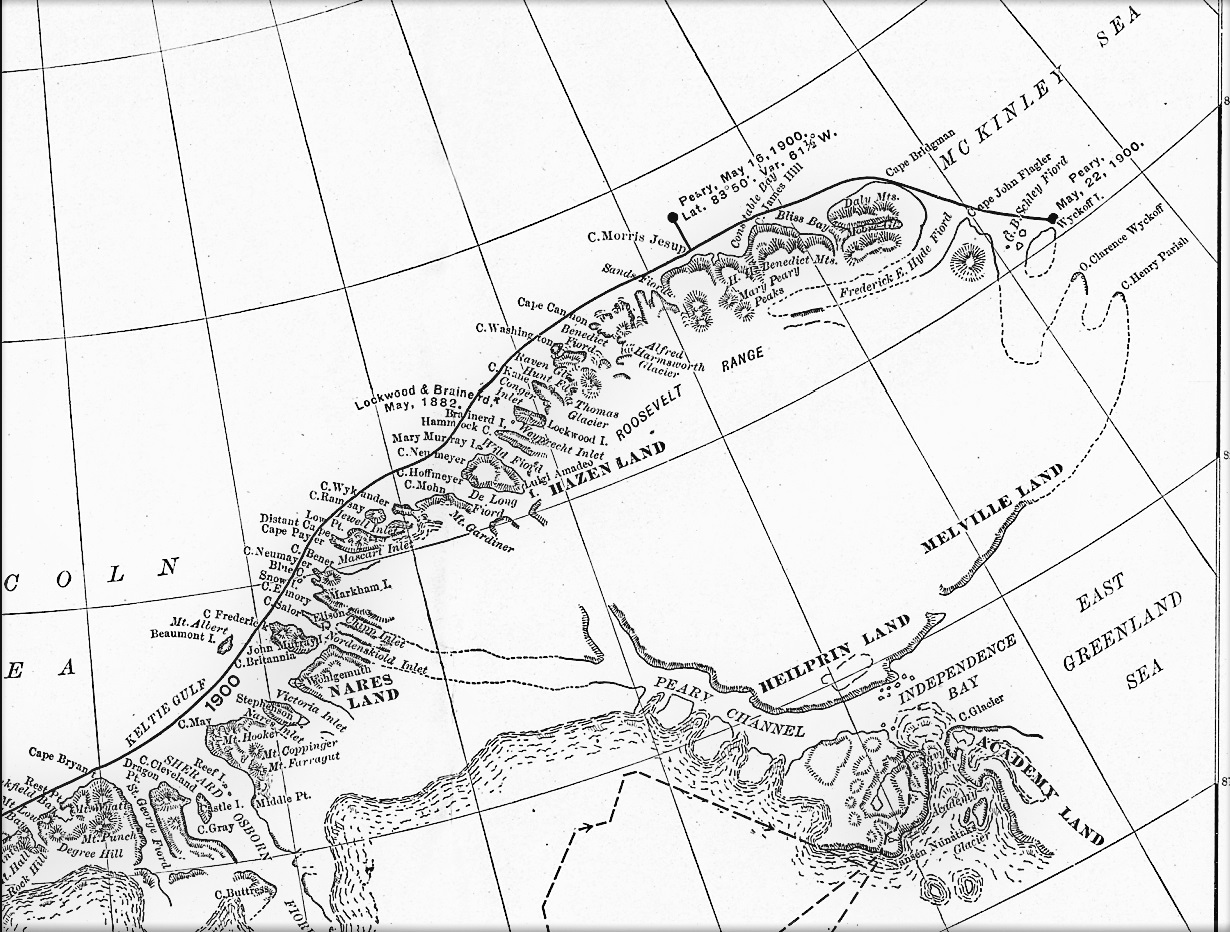
Robert Peary's 1903 Northern Greenland map showing the Peary Channel

==== Aasivitoqarsuaq ====
Aasivitoqarsuaq (formerly known as Pearylandville) is the largest Paleo-Eskimo site in Inutoqqat Nunaat as discovered by Eigil Knuth. The fauna present in Aasivitoqarsuaq is mainly dominated by muskox but also consists of arctic fox, hare, and arctic char as well as a few avian fauna consisting of geese and gull. The ruins are rich in both lithic debitage and fauna refuse meaning they were probably used as winter dwellings for several months; however, most of the ruins have less than 100 tools associated with it concluding that they probably were used for short periods of time. Researchers and archaeologists have noted that it is difficult to determine how long this site was used for as there is great difficulty in separating old remains from new ones. It has also been suggested the reason for the large number of ruins at Aasivitoqarsuaq is because it was used as a place for gathering for Independence I people. Aasivitoqarsuaq is considered one of the largest Independence I sites and the most extensively investigated. Knuth led major excavations there in 1964, 1966, 1968, and 1969, wherein he was able to successfully recover 820 lithic tools, 5312 flakes and a total of 2274 animal bones.

==== Adam C. Knuth ====
Adam C. Knuth is a large open site with many different ruins including dwellings and lithic workshops. It was discovered on one of the last days of Knuth's expeditions in 1980 who came across it accidentally and discovered a site littered with debitage and artefacts. It is the second biggest site after Aasivitoqarsuaq. The site holds 14 ruins including well-built midpassages ruins and 10 stone-build caches. Included in the ruins are some well-preserved midpassages with boulder tent ring and midpassages with round boulders. Some of the ruins in this site had the qualities of winter dwellings. This conclusion was drawn as result of a field team finding clear distinction between dwellings at this site. Some of the dwellings were large more solidly built dwellings which were theorised as being used as winter dwellings. The tent rings that were found were theorised as being used in the summer months as they did not have as sound construction. The distribution of artefacts along the midpassage indicate that these dwellings could be divided by gender with female seatings in one area and a working area on the other side.

==== Deltaterasserne ====
Deltaterasserne is one of the larger sites discovered by Eigil Knuth. The artefacts and ruins discovered at Deltaterasserne aided Knuth in discovering the existence of Independence I and Independence II culture in Greenland. The site has several ruins of dwellings and open-air hearths and therefore was theorised to be used for autumn and winter. The existences of larger dwellings in this site suggest they were main settlements during pitch dark winter when the Independence I people mainly relied on stored supplies. However other researchers have theorised that Deltaterasserne would have been the preferred summer site for Independence I people as they discovered a relatively large amount of bird bones. This site was linked with the Pearylandville site as the microblade ruins discovered at both sites were the same therefore showing these sites were most likely inhabited by the same people. This site has evidence of both Independence I and Independence II culture however the formers settlement was more intense than the latter.

== Disappearance ==
The Independence I culture lived in Greenland for approximately 500–700 years and disappeared with Independence II culture appearing roughly 600 years later. The extreme temperatures of northern Greenland and the unreliability of their main food source of muskox, which was prone to overhunting, could have contributed to their demise.

== General references ==
- Bjarne Grønnow; Jens Fog Jensen (2003). The Northernmost Ruins of the Globe (Vol. 329): Eigil Knuth's Archaeological Investigations in Peary Land and Adjacent Areas of High Arctic Greenland (PDF). Museum Tusculanum Press. doi:10.26530/OAPEN_342372. ISBN 978-87-635-3065-1.
