= Independence II culture =

Paleo-Eskimo culture of northern Greenland

Areas of Independence I and Independence II cultures around Independence Fjord

Independence II was a Paleo-Eskimo culture that flourished in northern and northeastern Greenland from around 700 to 80 BC, north and south of the Independence Fjord. The Independence II culture existed in roughly the same areas of Greenland as the Independence I culture, which became extinct six centuries before the beginning of Independence II.

Independence II is attested in northern Greenland by settlements on central Peary Land. There, it is estimated that the Independence II population was of no more than four to six families, and that it must therefore have been in contact with people of Ellesmere island in Canada or with people in north-eastern Greenland.

It has been argued that there is virtually no difference in the material cultures of Independence II and the contemporary Dorset culture in southern Greenland, locally known as Dorset I. Those who lump these two entities together refer to them jointly as Greenlandic Dorset. Unlike Independence II, to the south, Dorset I persisted to at least AD 800.

Danish explorer Eigil Knuth first recognised the existence of Independence I and II.
