= Mount Grosvenor (Alaska Range) =

Mountain in Alaska, United States

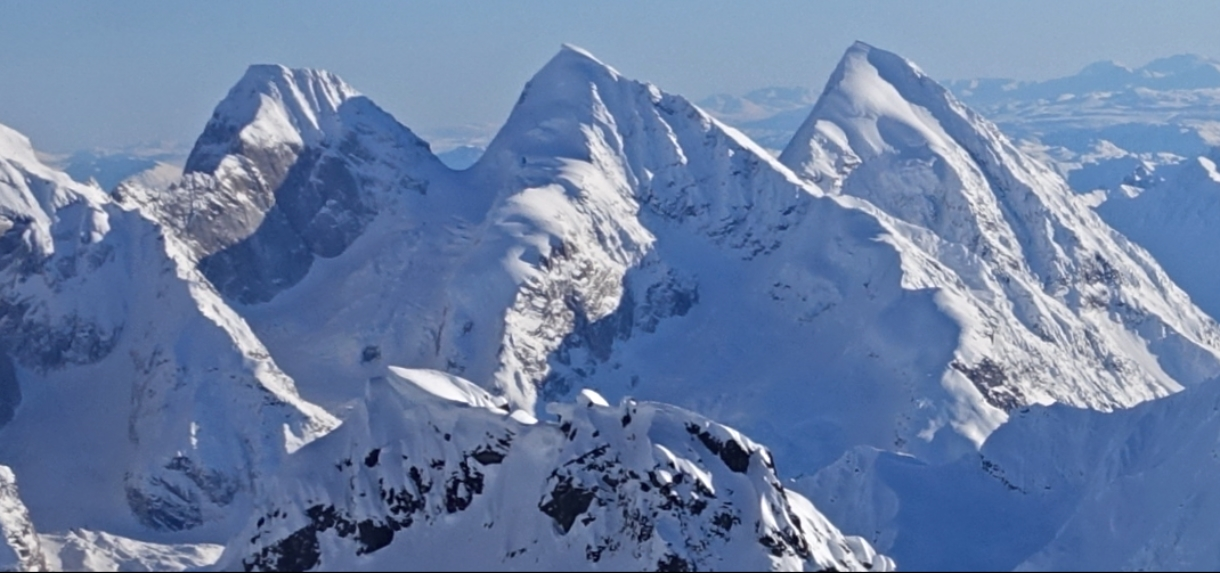
- Aerial view from northwest. Mt. Grosvenor centered, flanked by Johnson (left), Church (right)

Highest point
- Elevation: 8,400+ ft (2,560+ m)
- Prominence: 925 ft (282 m)
- Parent peak: Mount Wake
- Coordinates: 62°53′13″N 150°42′23″W

Geography
- Location within Alaska
- Interactive map of Mount Grosvenor
- Country: United States
- State: Alaska
- Borough: Matanuska-Susitna
- Protected area: Denali National Park
- Parent range: Alaska Range
- Topo map: USGS Talkeetna D-2

Geology
- Rock type: Granite

Climbing
- First ascent: 1979

Mount Grosvenor is an 8,400+ ft (2,560+ m) mountain summit located in the Alaska Range, in Denali National Park and Preserve, in Alaska, United States. It is situated on the west side of the Ruth Gorge, 0.87 mi (1 km) northwest of Mount Church and 0.54 mi (1 km) south of Mt. Johnson. Its nearest higher peak is Mount Wake, 1.32 miles (2.12 km) to the northwest. Despite its relatively low elevation, it is notable for its east face with over 4,000 feet of vertical sheer granite. The mountain was named by famed explorer Dr. Frederick Cook who claimed the first ascent of Denali in 1906, but was later disproved. This peak's unofficial name honors Gilbert Hovey Grosvenor (1875–1966), President of the National Geographic Society, father of photojournalism, and the first full-time editor of National Geographic magazine. The first ascent of the peak was made in 1979 by Gary Bocarde, Charlie Head, John Lee, and Jon Thomas.

== Climate ==
Based on the Köppen climate classification, Mount Grosvenor is located in a subarctic climate zone with long, cold, snowy winters, and cool summers. Winter temperatures can drop below −20 °C with wind chill factors below −30 °C. The months May through June offer the most favorable weather for climbing or viewing.

== Gallery ==
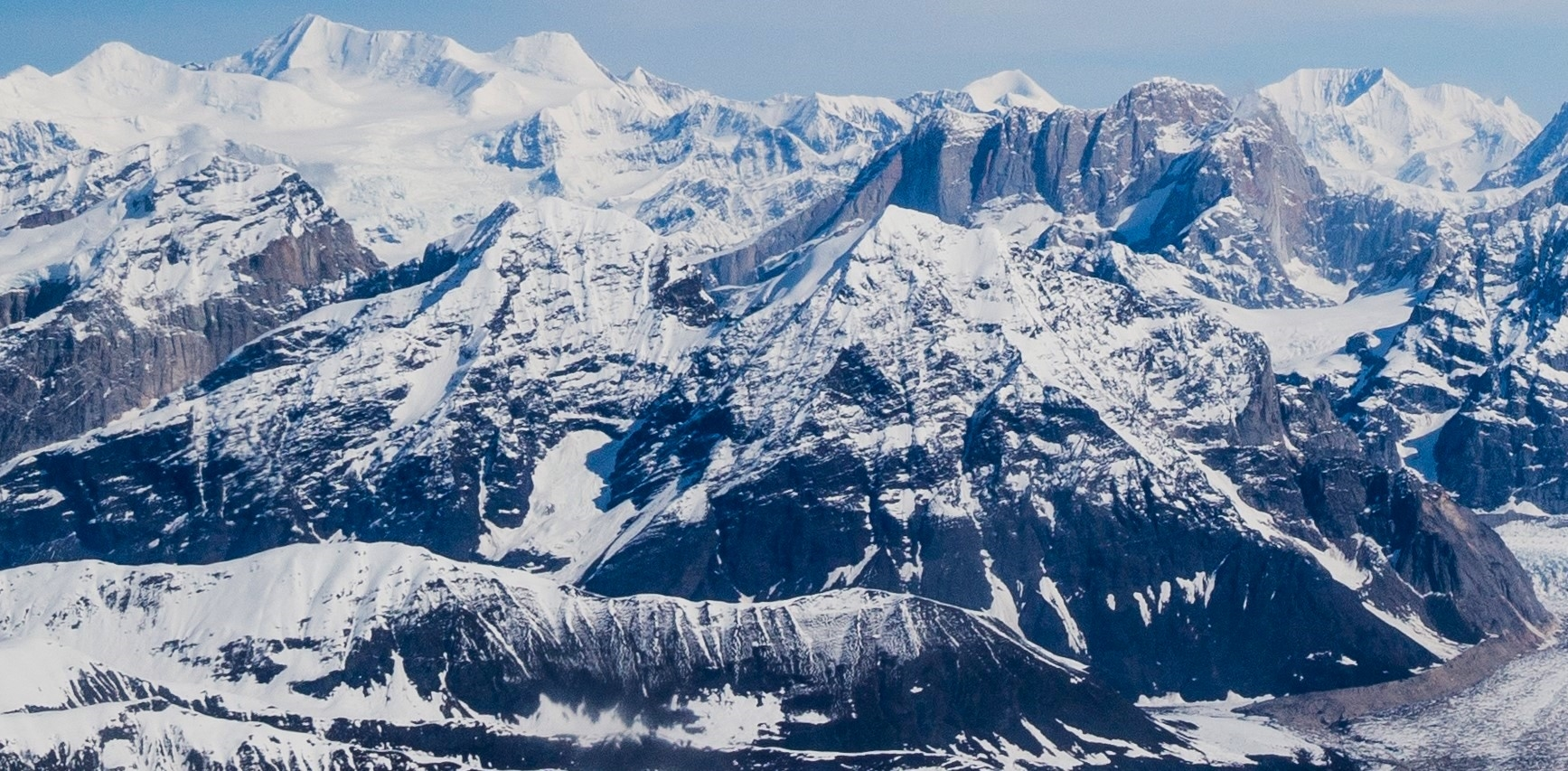
Mt. Grosvenor (left) and Mt. Church (right) appear as snowy twin peaks in the center. South aspect.

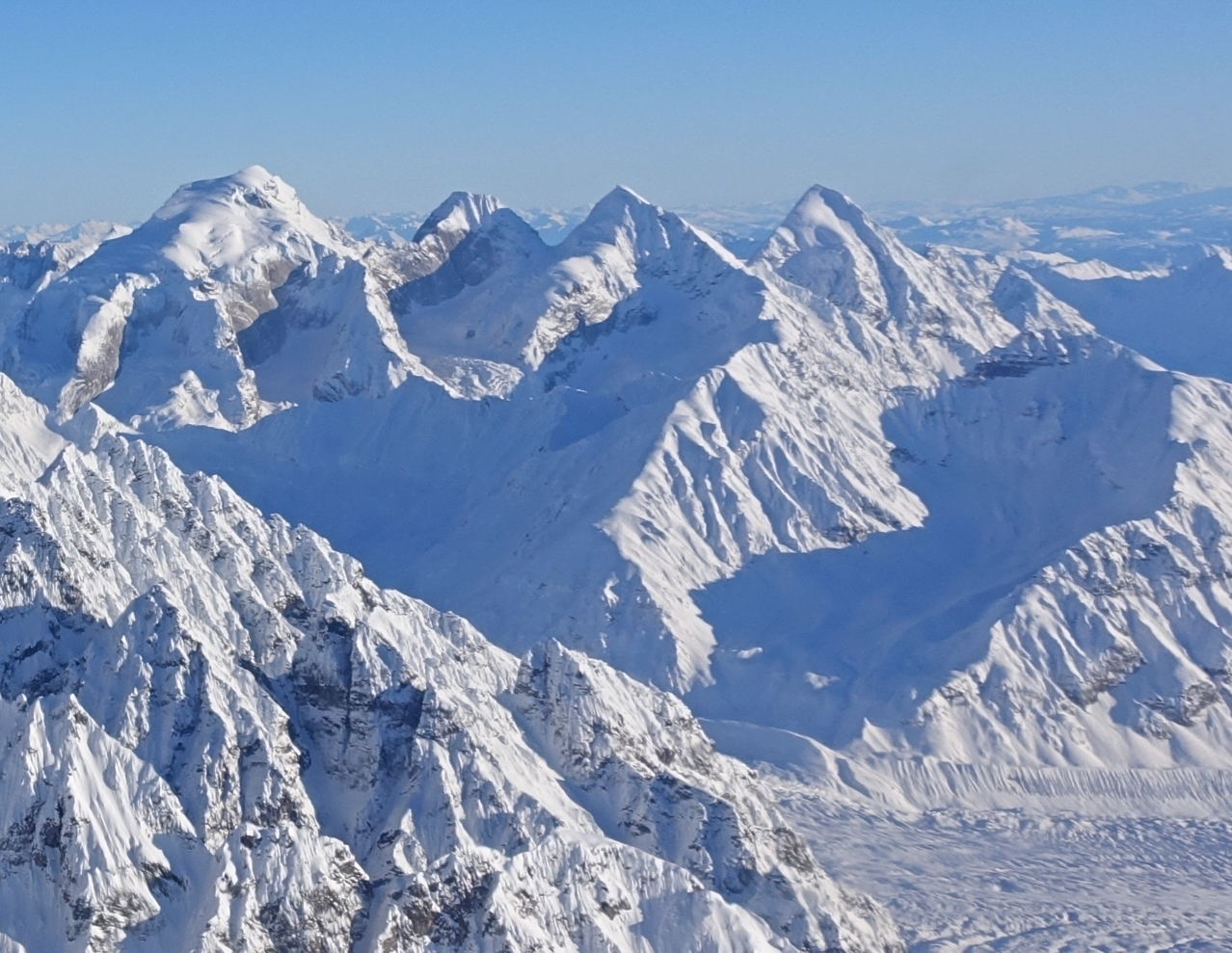
Aerial view from northwest. Left to right: Mt. Wake, Mt. Johnson, Mt. Grosvenor, and Mt. Church

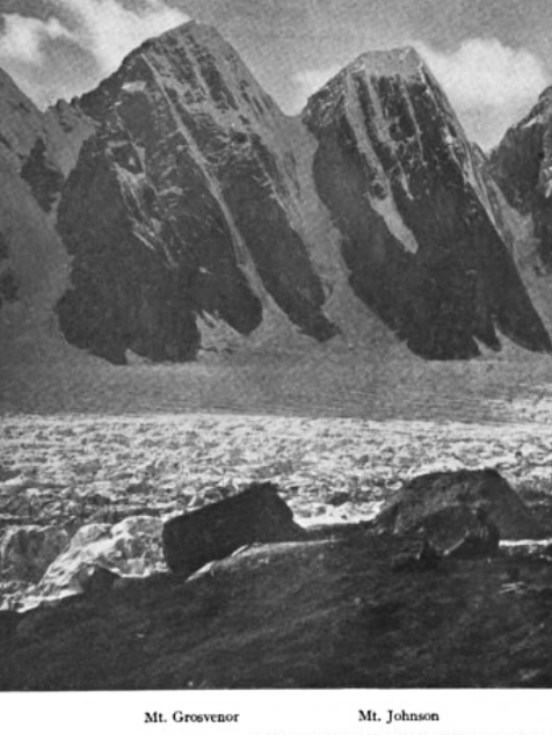
Mts. Grosvenor and Johnson by Frederick Cook circa 1906

== See also ==
- Mountain peaks of Alaska
