= Pease Peak =

Mountain in Alaska, United States

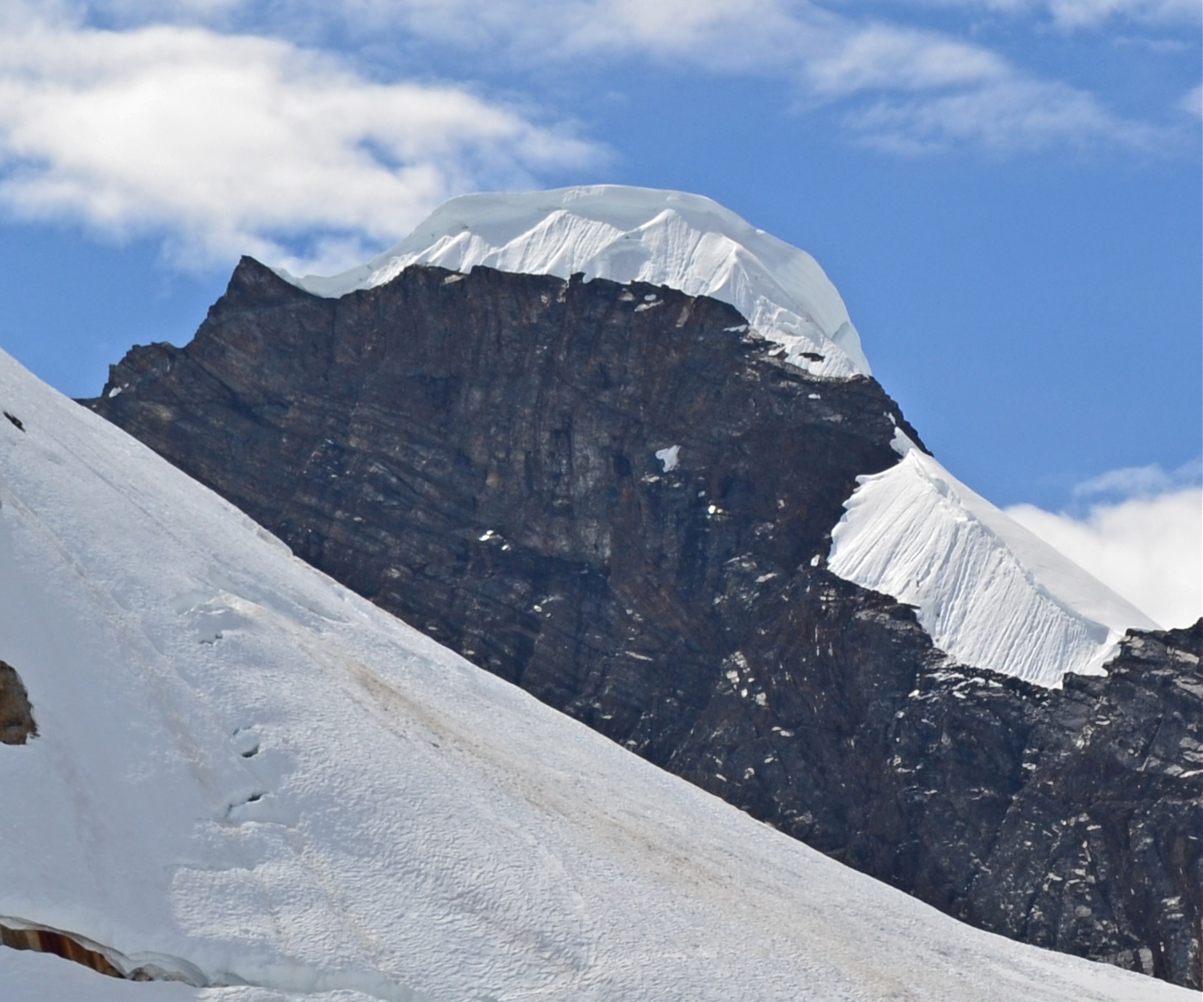
- Pease Peak

Highest point
- Elevation: 7,750 ft (2,360 m)
- Prominence: 500 ft (150 m)
- Parent peak: Mount Dickey (2,495 ft)
- Coordinates: 62°57′00″N 150°45′45″W

Geography
- Location within Alaska
- Interactive map of Pease Peak
- Location: Matanuska-Susitna Borough, Alaska, United States
- Parent range: Alaska Range
- Topo map: USGS Talkeetna D-2

Pease Peak is a 7,750 ft (2,360 m) mountain summit located in the Alaska Range, in Denali National Park and Preserve, in the U.S. state of Alaska. It is situated 1,500 feet above the Tokositna Glacier to its west, and Ruth Glacier to the east, along the southern margin of the Don Sheldon Amphitheater, 11 mi (18 km) southeast of Denali, 2.84 mi (5 km) southeast of The Rooster Comb, and 0.45 mi (1 km) west of Mount Dickey, which is the nearest higher peak. Dickey forms the eastern buttress of Pittock Pass, whereas Pease forms the western buttress. Although overlooked as a climbing destination, the peak is often seen due to its proximity to the air taxi landing area and the Sheldon Chalet immediately north of the peak. Pease Peak, and its variant name Mount Pease, is based on a mountain climber's name that was published in the late 1940s.

== Climate ==
Based on the Köppen climate classification, Pease Peak is located in an alpine climate zone with long, cold, snowy winters, and cool summers. Temperatures can drop below −20 °C with wind chill factors below −30 °C.

== Gallery ==
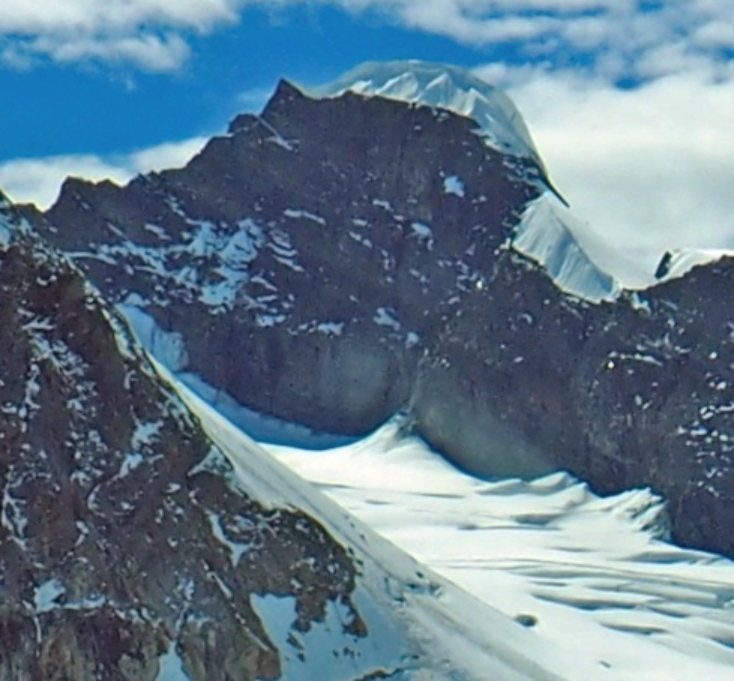

== See also ==
- List of mountain peaks of Alaska
- Geology of Alaska
