= Mount Church (Alaska) =

Mountain in Alaska, United States

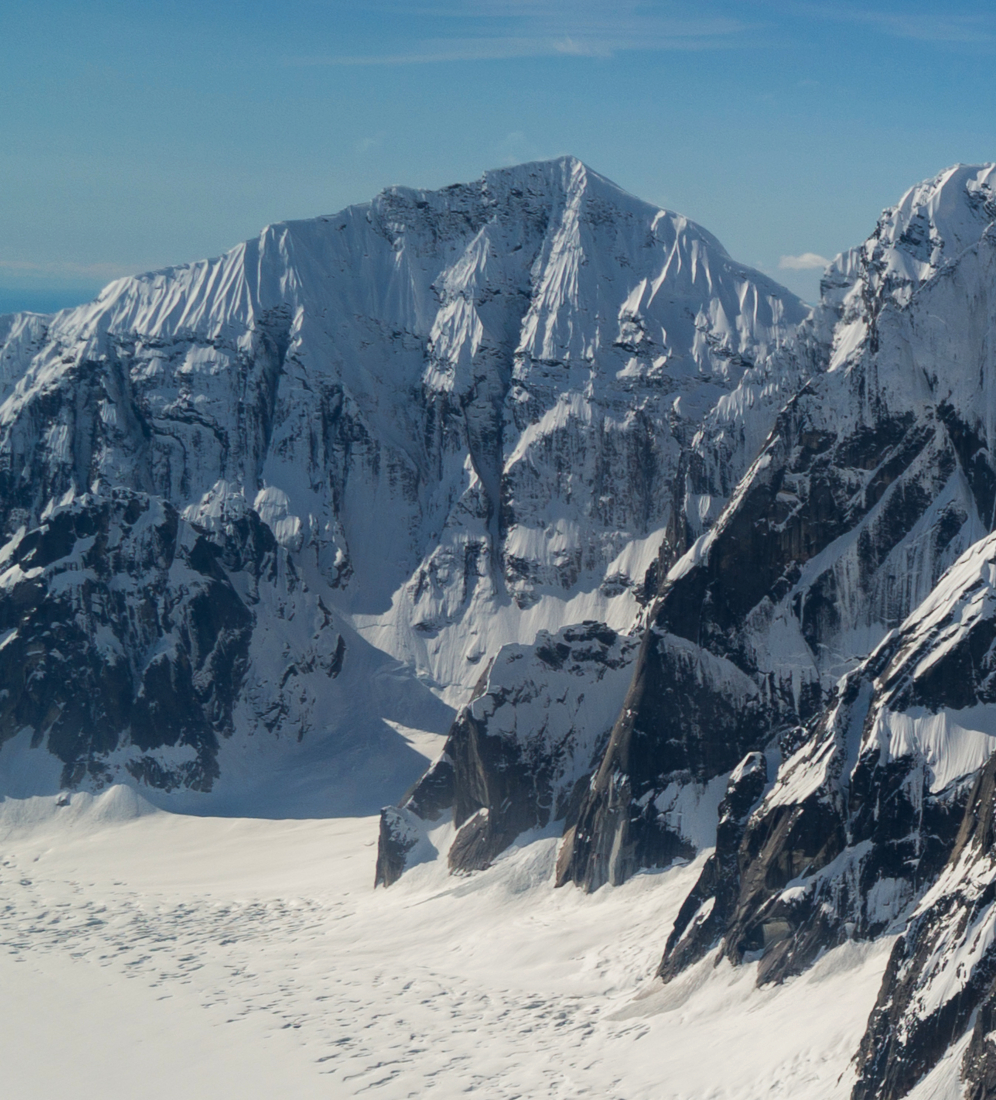
- North aspect

Highest point
- Elevation: 7,621 ft (2,323 m)
- Prominence: 3,920 ft (1,190 m)
- Coordinates: 62°52′45″N 150°41′00″W

Geography
- Location within Alaska
- Interactive map of Mount Church
- Location: Matanuska-Susitna Borough; Alaska, United States
- Parent range: Alaska Range
- Topo map: USGS Talkeetna D-2

Mount Church is a 7,621-foot (2,323 m) mountain in the Alaska Range, in Denali National Park and Preserve, overlooking Ruth Glacier. It is situated on the west side of the Ruth Gorge and 0.87 mi (1 km) southeast of Mount Grosvenor, which is the nearest higher neighbor. The mountain was named by famed explorer Dr. Frederick Cook who claimed the first ascent of Mount McKinley in 1906, but was later disproved.

== Climate ==
Based on the Köppen climate classification, Mount Church is located in a subarctic climate zone with long, cold, snowy winters, and cool summers. Winter temperatures can drop below −20 °C with wind chill factors below −30 °C. The months May through June offer the most favorable weather for climbing or viewing.

== Gallery ==
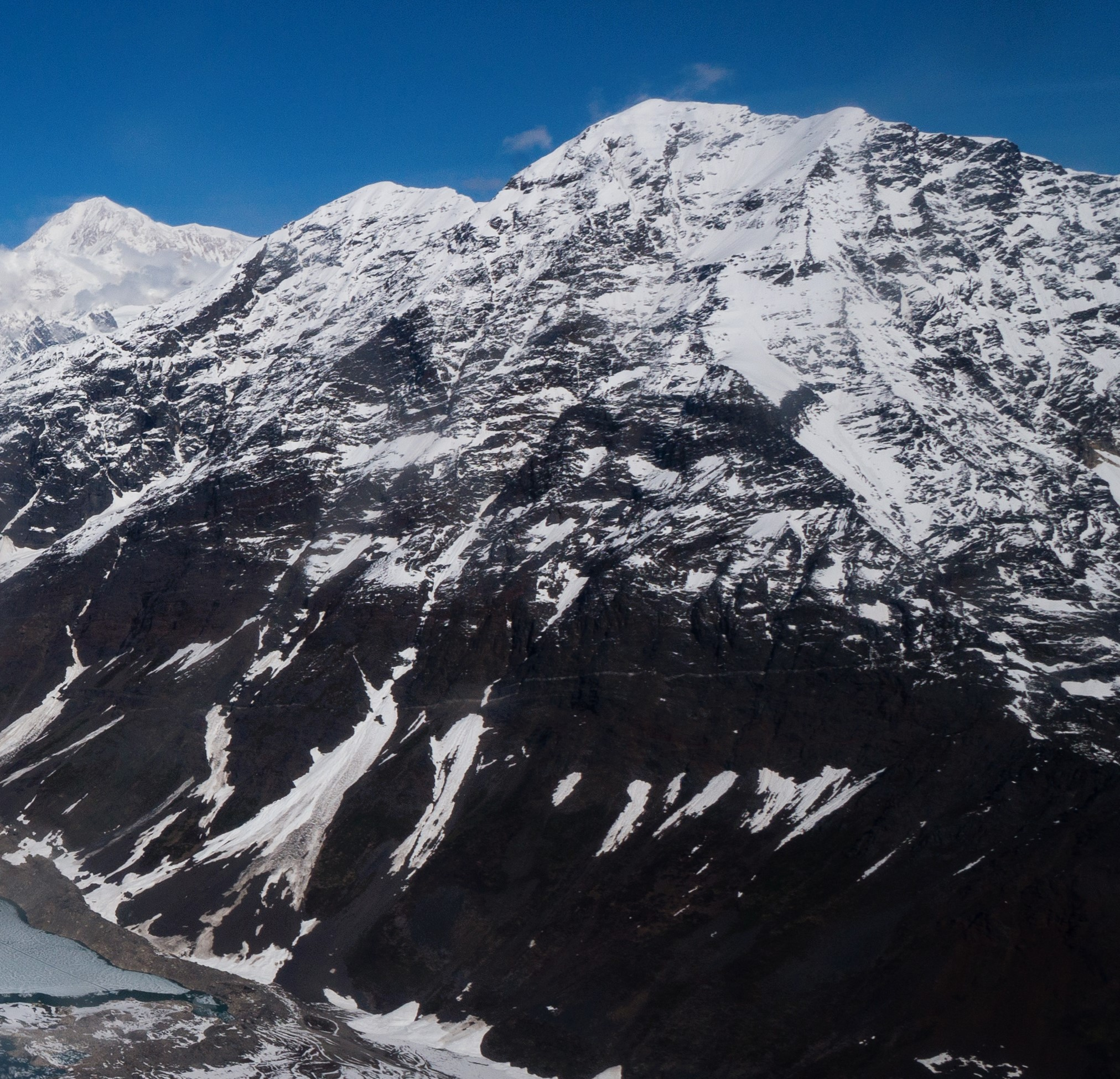
South Aspect

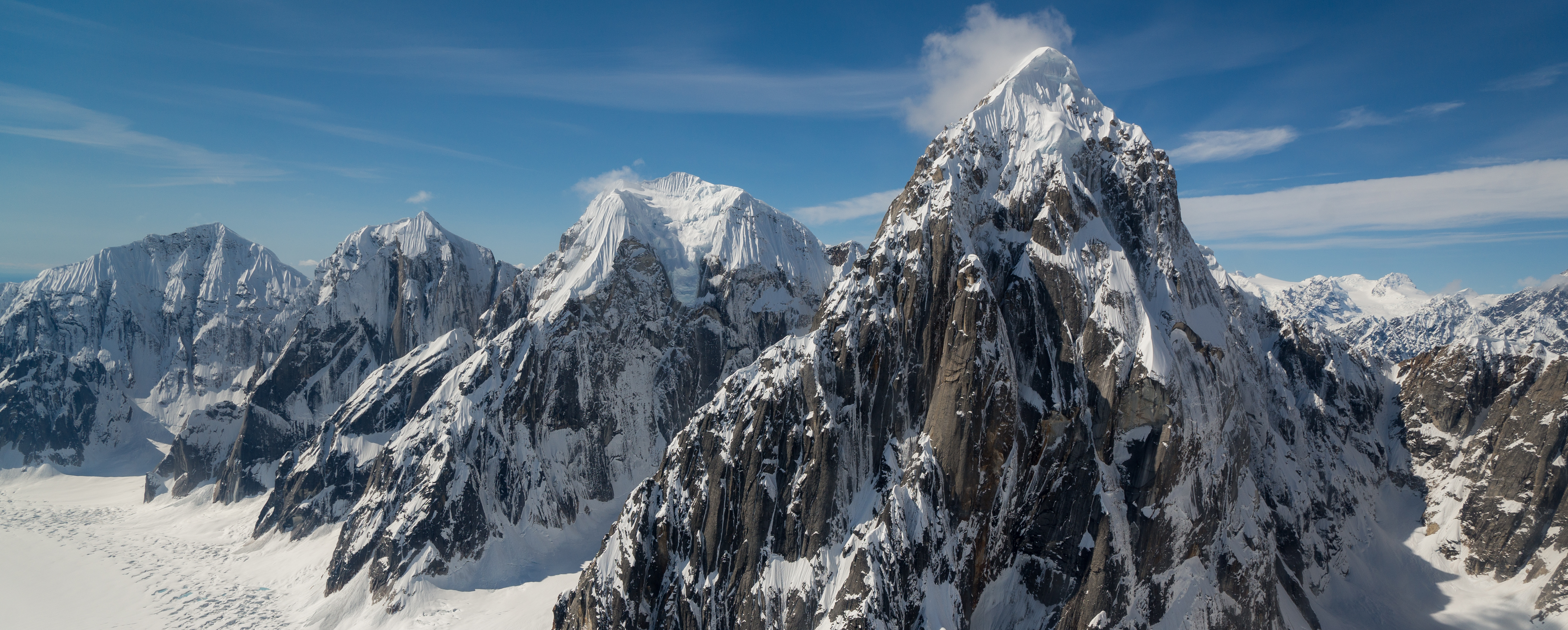
Left → Right: Mount Church, Mount Johnson, Mount Wake, and Mount Bradley

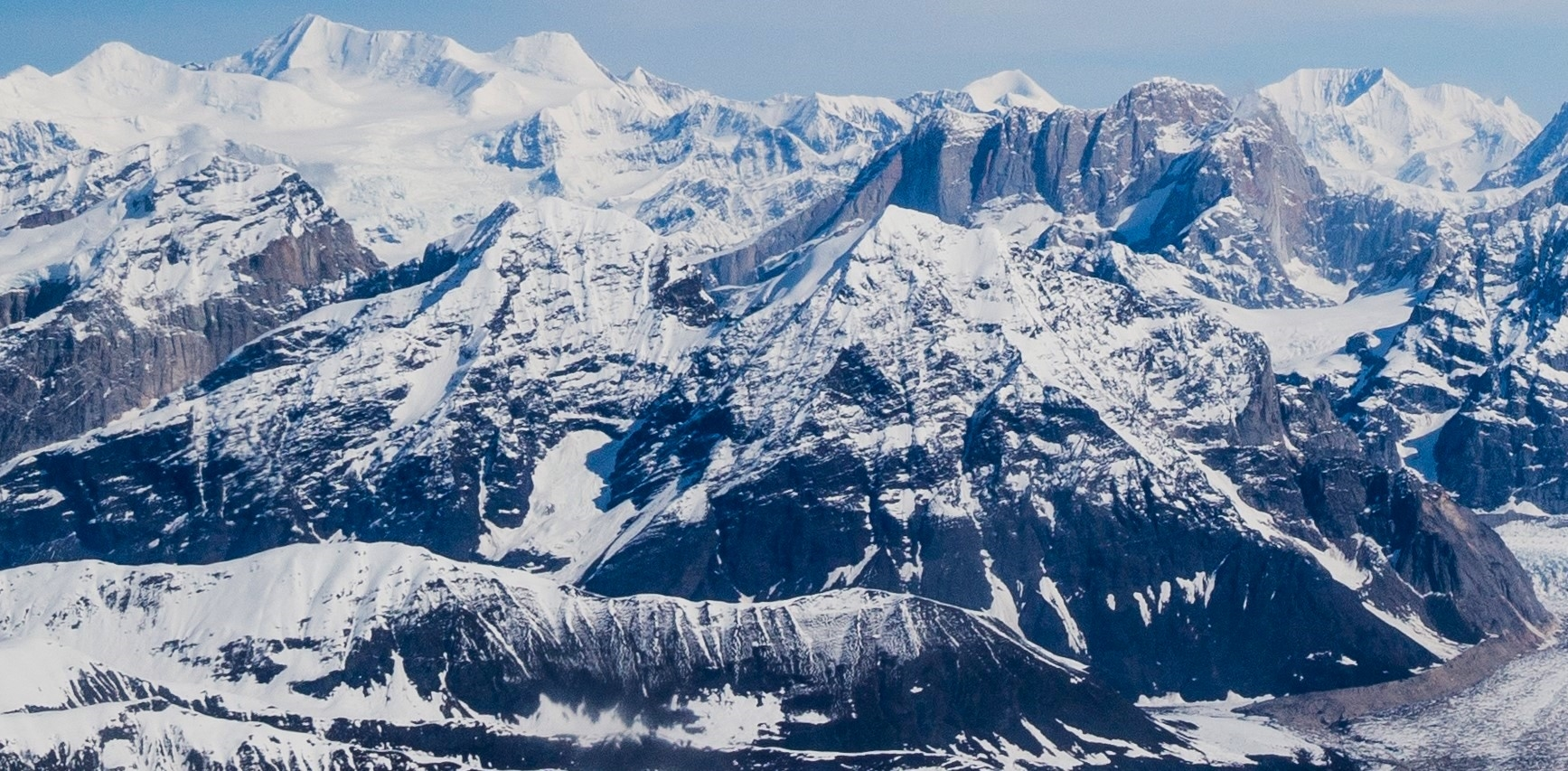
Mt. Grosvenor (left) and Mt. Church (right) appear as snowy twin peaks in the center. South aspect.

== See also ==
- Mountain peaks of Alaska
