= Mount Bradley (Alaska) =

Mountain in Alaska, US

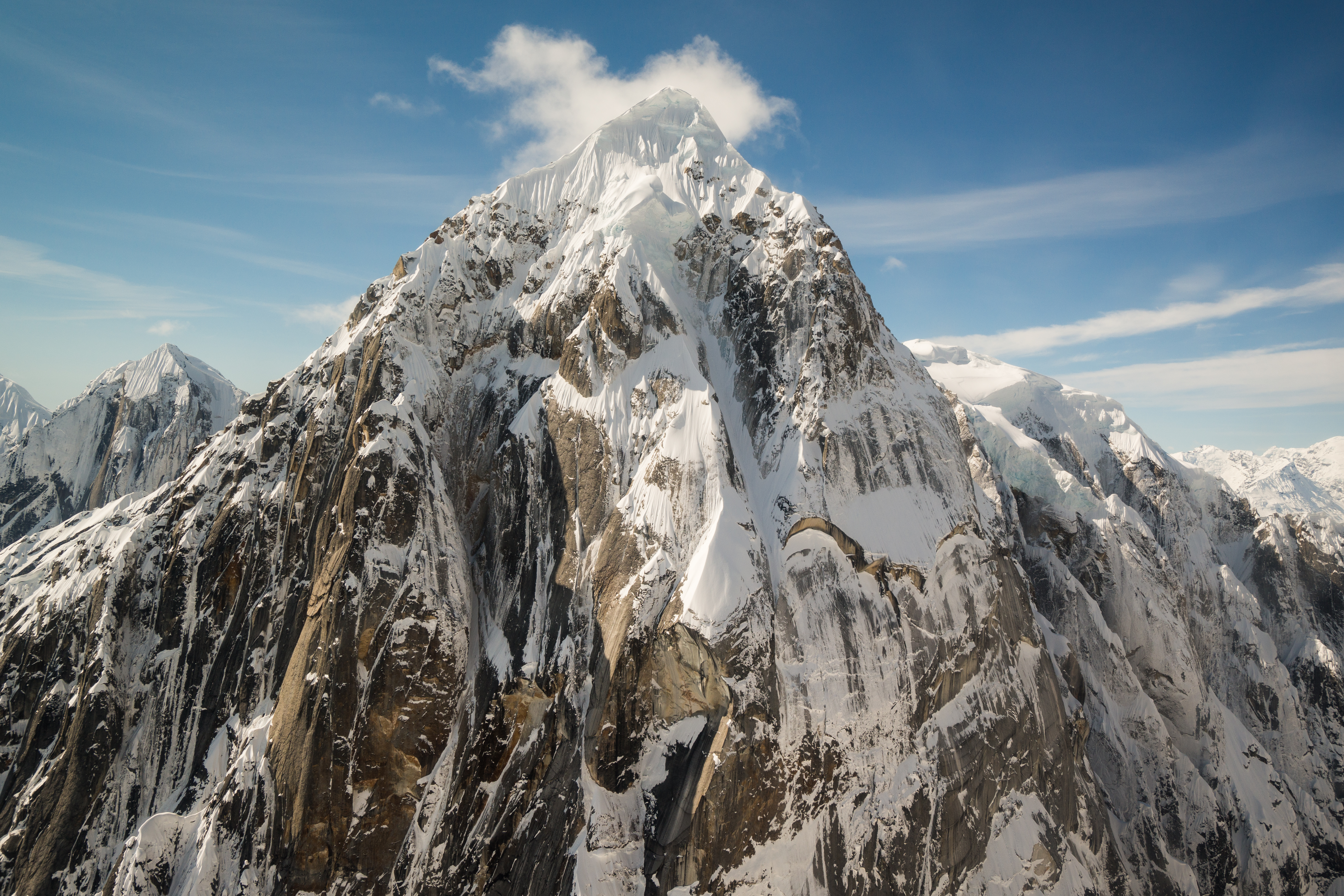
- Aerial view of Mount Bradley

Highest point
- Elevation: 9,100+ ft (2,770+ m)
- Prominence: 2,700 ft (820 m)
- Coordinates: 62°55′29″N 150°43′35″W

Geography
- Location within Alaska
- Interactive map of Mount Bradley
- Country: United States
- State: Alaska
- Borough: Matanuska-Susitna
- Protected area: Denali National Park
- Parent range: Alaska Range
- Topo map: USGS Talkeetna D-2

Geology
- Rock type: Granite

Mount Bradley is a 9,100+ ft (2,770+ m) mountain summit located in the Alaska Range, in Denali National Park and Preserve, in Alaska, United States. It is situated on the west side of the Ruth Gorge, 13.33 mi (21 km) southeast of Denali and 4.68 mi (8 km) southwest of The Moose's Tooth. Its nearest higher peak is Mount Dickey, 1.41 miles (2.27 km) to the north, Mount Wake lies 1.51 miles (2.43 km) to the south, and London Tower rises 2.55 miles (4.10 km) directly east on the opposite side of The Great Gorge. Despite its relatively low elevation, it is notable for its north face with nearly 5,000 feet of vertical sheer granite. The mountain was named by famed explorer Dr. Frederick Cook for John R. Bradley, a wealthy casino owner from Florida and one of Cook's financial sponsors.

== Climate ==
Based on the Köppen climate classification, Mount Bradley is located in a subarctic climate zone with long, cold, snowy winters, and cool summers. Temperatures can drop below −20 °F with wind chill factors below −30 °F. The months May through June offer the most favorable weather for viewing and climbing.

== See also ==
- Mountain peaks of Alaska
- Bradley Land

== Gallery ==
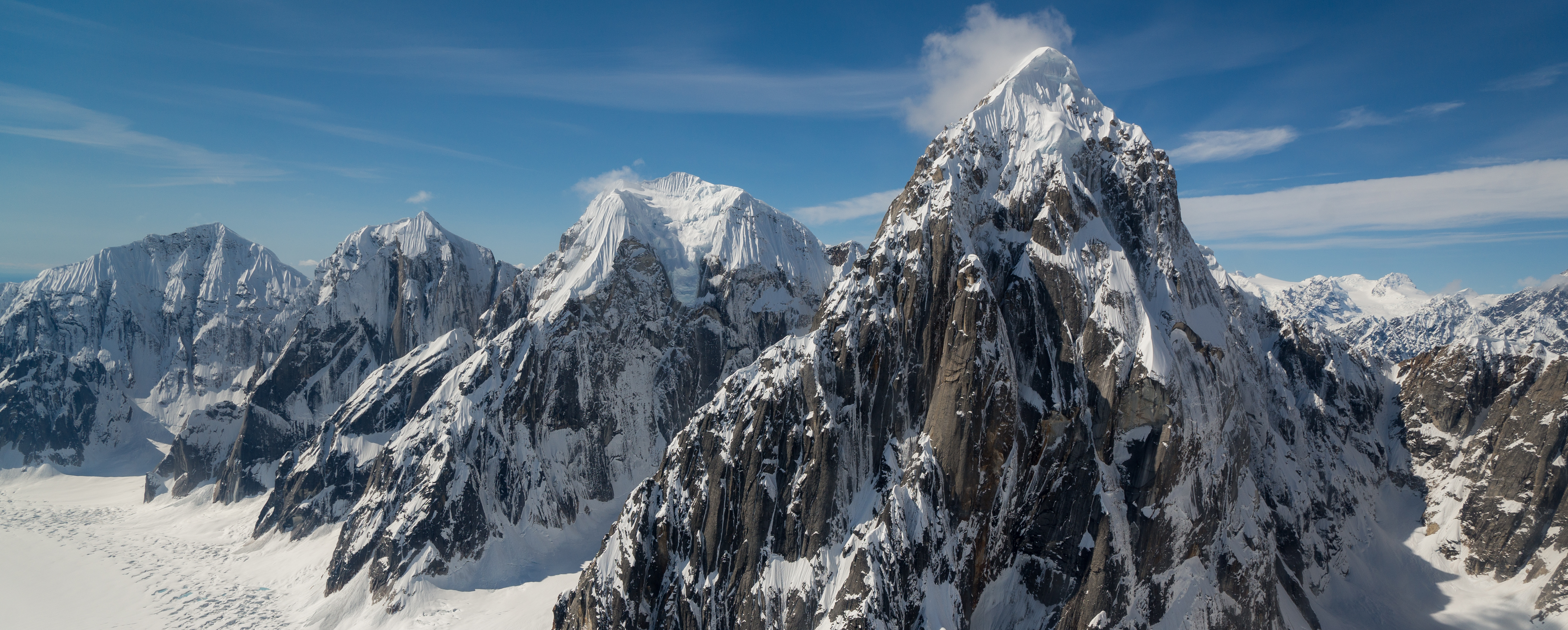
Left to right: Mount Church, Mount Johnson, Mount Wake, and Mount Bradley seen from a flight through Ruth Gorge

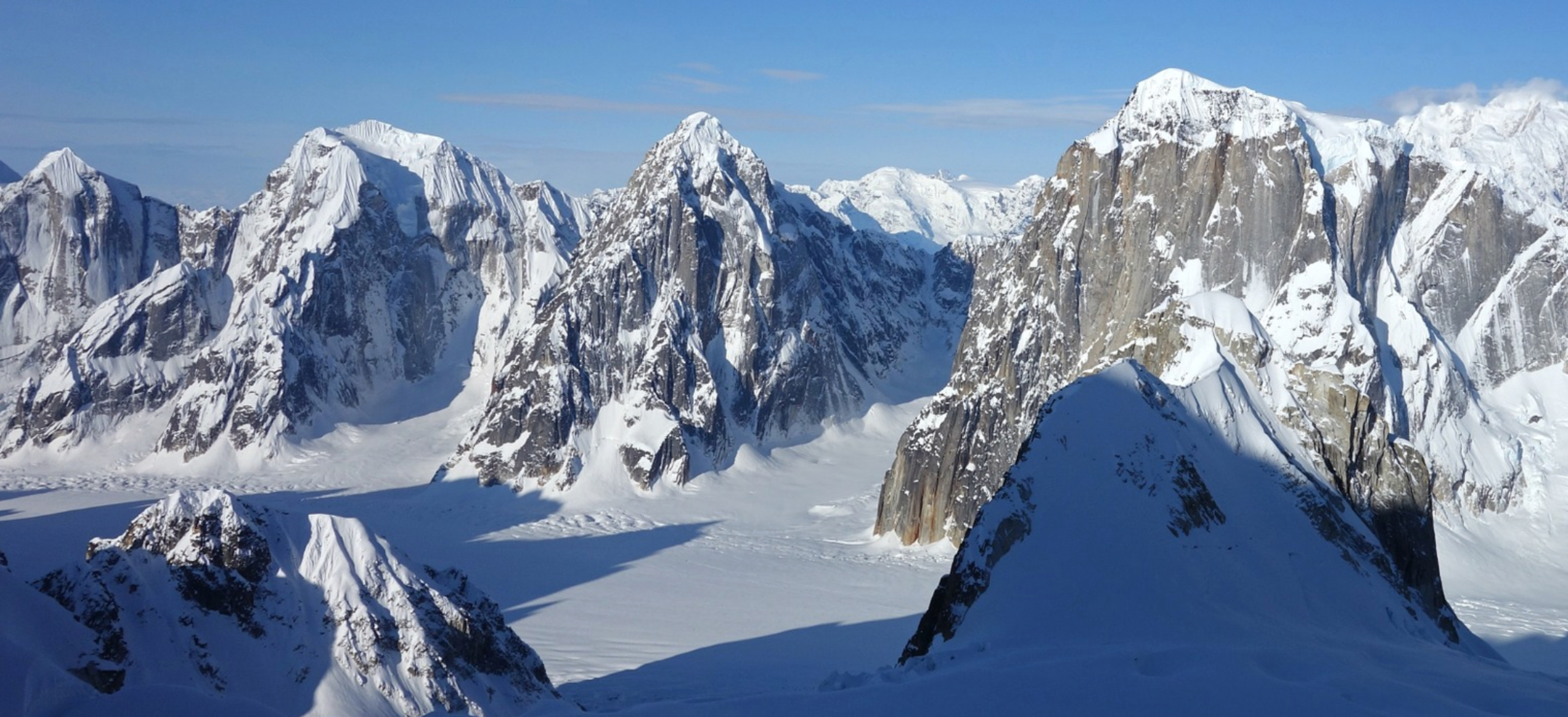
Left to right: Mount Johnson, Mount Wake, Mount Bradley, and Mount Dickey seen from the Moose's Tooth area

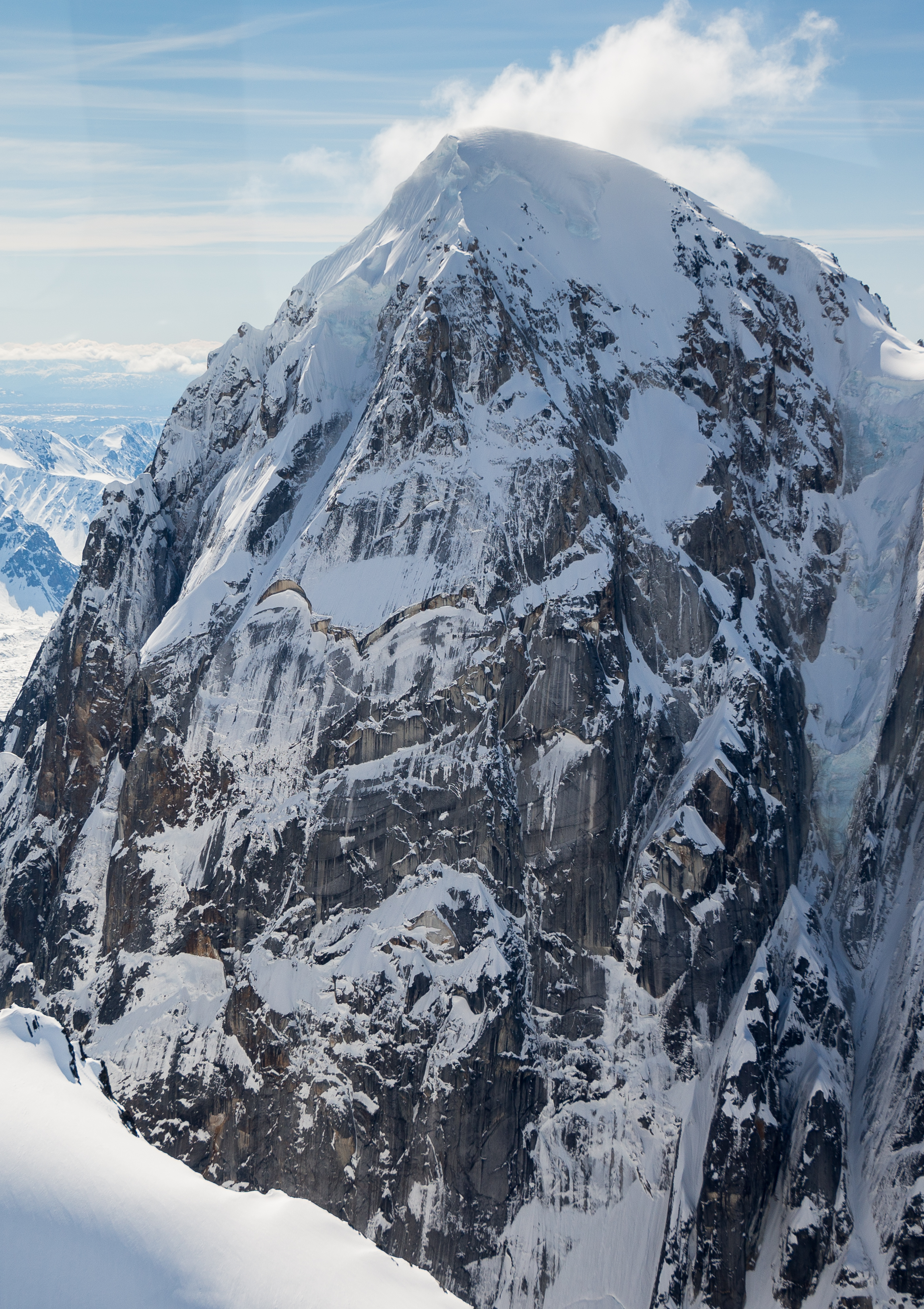
Mount Bradley from northwest

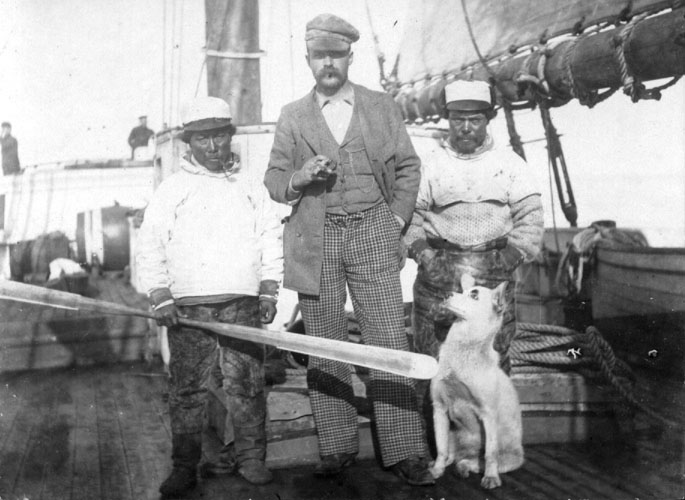
John R. Bradley in 1907
