= Tower of London (disambiguation) =

The Tower of London is a former Royal residence in London.

Tower(s) of London may also refer to:

== Geography ==
- Tower of London Range, Northern Rockies, Canada
- London Tower (Alaska), a mountain in Denali National Park
- Watkin's Tower, a former observation tower in London marketed the Great Tower of London

== Film and television ==
- The Tower of London (1905 film), French short film
- Tower of London (1939 film), a black-and-white historical film
- Tower of London (1962 film), a historical drama and gothic horror film
- "Tower of London" (The Goodies), a 1970 television episode
- "Tower of London" (Penny Crayon), a 1989 television episode
- Towers of London, Harry Alan Towers' British-Canadian film production company

== Literature ==
- The Tower of London (novel), a 19th-century novel by William Harrison Ainsworth
- The Tower of London (short story), a short story by Natsume Sōseki

== Music ==
- Towers of London (band), an English punk rock band
- "Towers of London" (song), a song by XTC
- "Tower of London", a song by ABC from the album How to Be a ... Zillionaire!

== Other uses ==
- Tower of London test, a neuropsychological test
