= Mount Wake =

Mountain in Alaska, United States

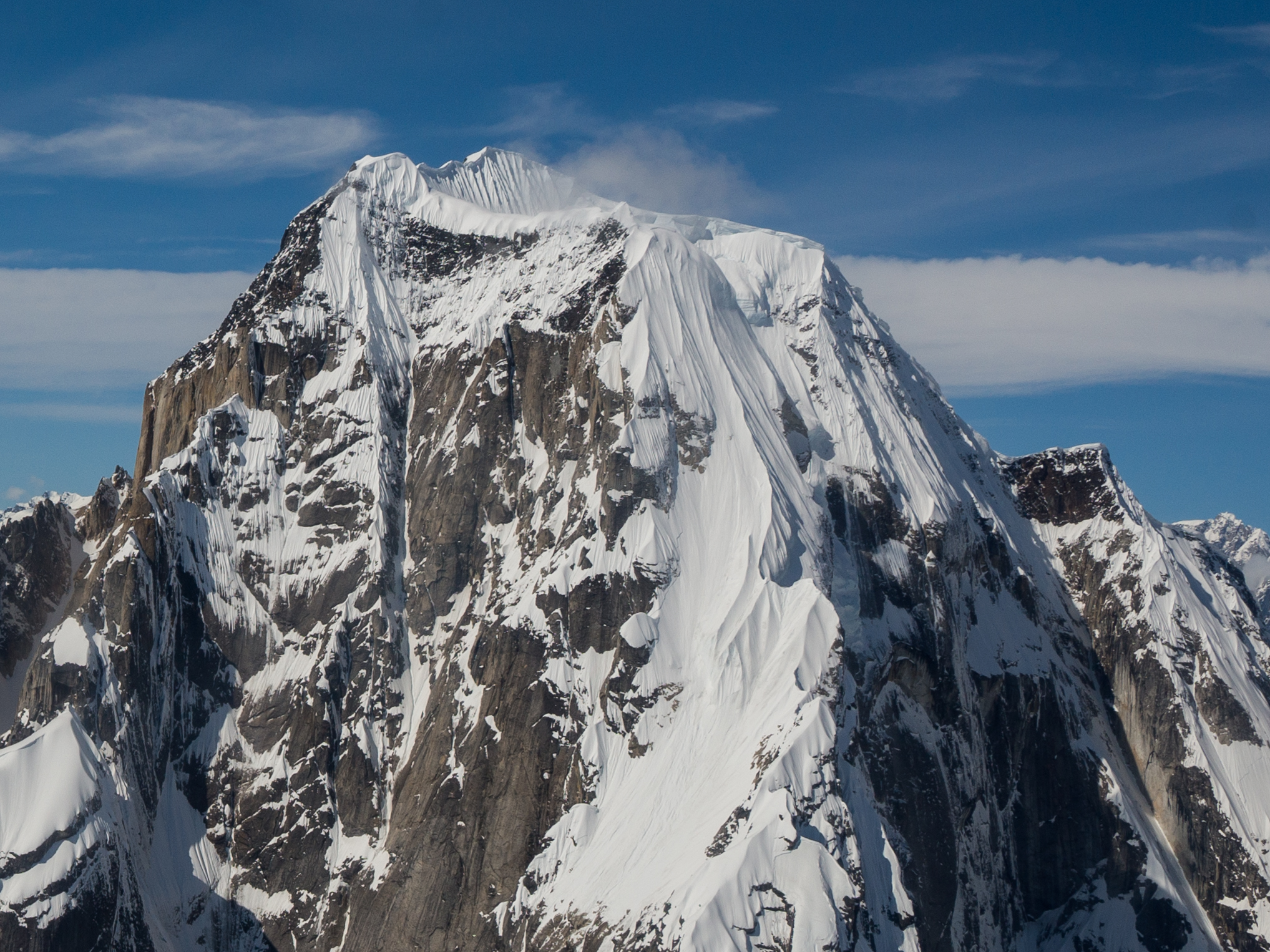
- Aerial view of east aspect

Highest point
- Elevation: 9,100+ ft (2,770+ m)
- Prominence: 1,900 ft (580 m)
- Isolation: 2.92 mi (4.70 km)
- Coordinates: 62°54′10″N 150°43′46″W

Geography
- Location within Alaska
- Interactive map of Mount Wake
- Country: United States
- State: Alaska
- Borough: Matanuska-Susitna
- Protected area: Denali National Park
- Parent range: Alaska Range
- Topo map: USGS Talkeetna D-2

Geology
- Rock type: Granite

Climbing
- First ascent: 1979 Gary Bocarde, Nick Parker, Paul Denkewalter

Mount Wake is a 9,100+ ft (2,770+ m) mountain summit located in the Alaska Range, in Denali National Park and Preserve, in Alaska, United States. It is situated on the west side of the Ruth Gorge, 14.44 mi (23 km) southeast of Denali and 5.85 mi (9 km) southwest of The Moose's Tooth. The nearest higher neighbor is Mount Dickey, 2.92 miles (4.70 km) to the north. Mount Bradley lies 1.51 miles (2.43 km) to the north, and Mount Johnson lies 0.89 miles (1.43 km) to the southeast. Despite its relatively low elevation, it is notable for its north face with over 4,000 feet of vertical sheer granite. The mountain was named by famed explorer Dr. Frederick Cook for his friend Charles Wake.

== Climate ==
Based on the Köppen climate classification, Mount Wake is located in a Tundra climate zone with long, cold, snowy winters, and cool summers. Weather systems are forced upwards by the Alaska Range (orographic lift), causing heavy precipitation in the form of snowfall. Winter temperatures can drop below −20 °F with wind chill factors below −30 °F. The months May through June offer the most favorable weather for viewing and climbing.

== Gallery ==
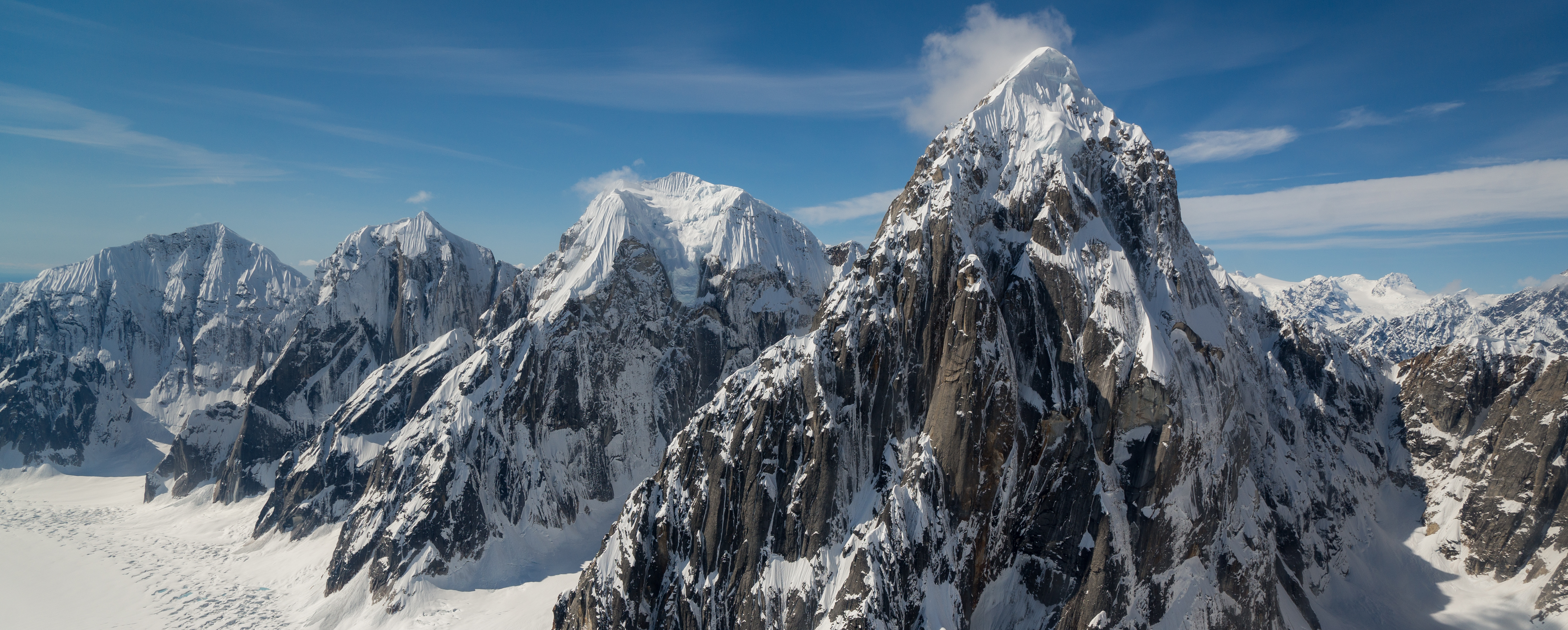
Left to right: Mount Church, Mount Johnson, Mount Wake, and Mount Bradley seen from a flight through Ruth Gorge

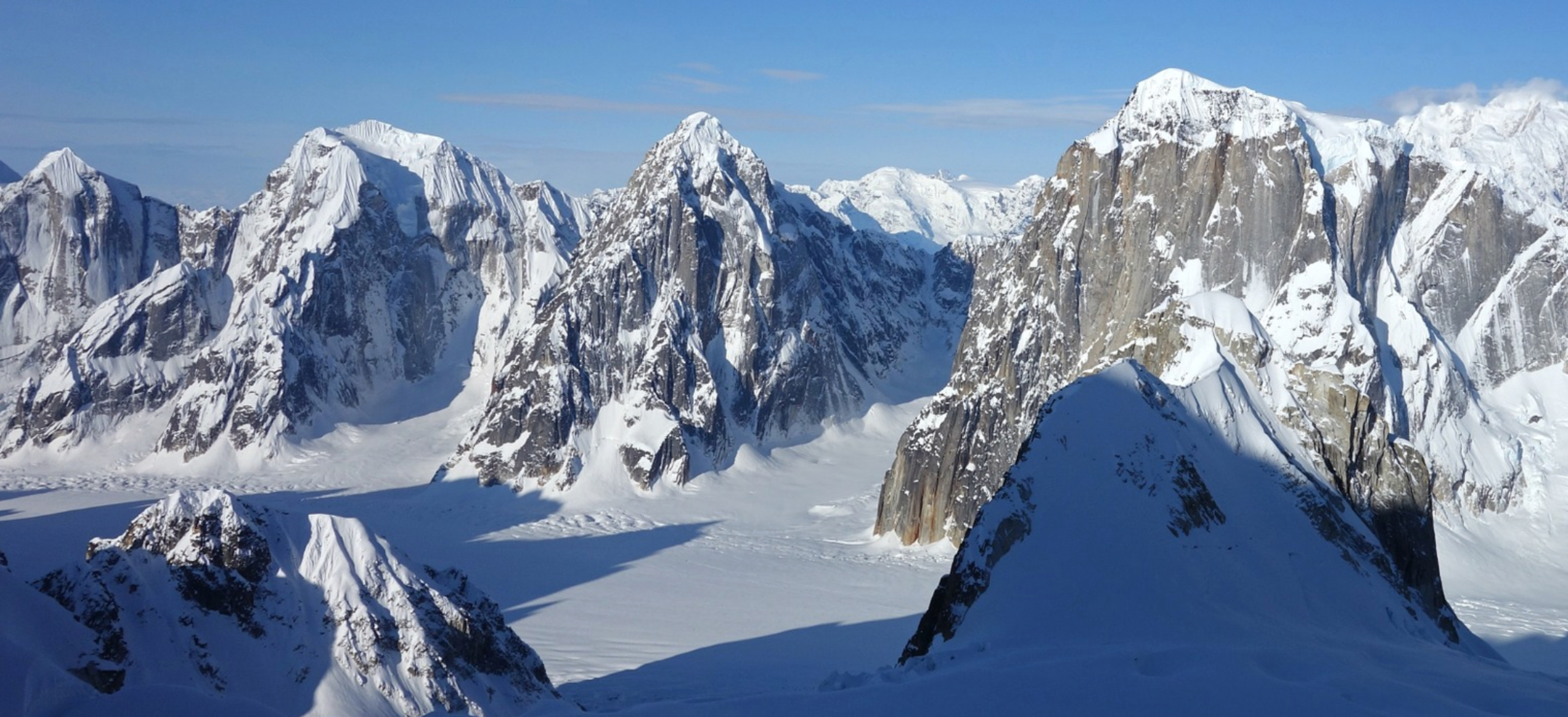
Left to right: Mount Johnson, Mount Wake, Mount Bradley, and Mount Dickey seen from the Moose's Tooth area

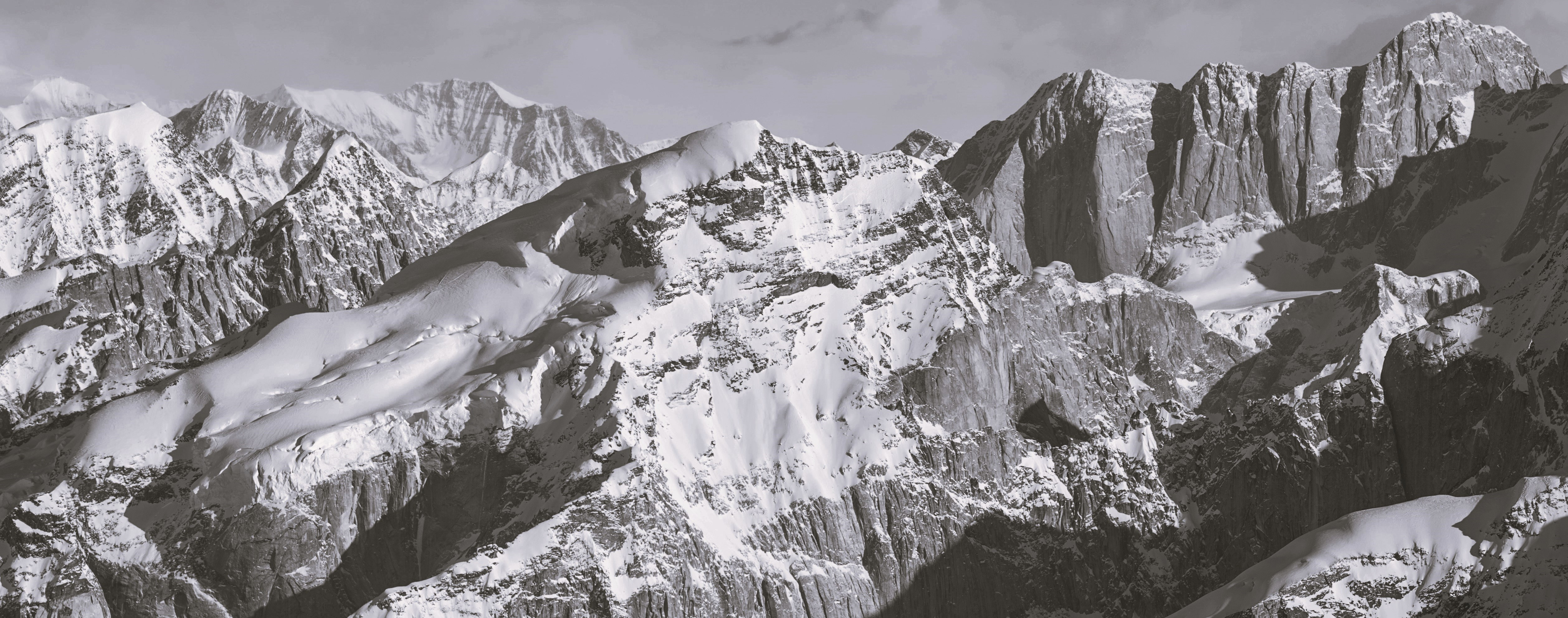
Aerial view of southwest aspect of Mount Wake (centered)

== See also ==
- Mountain peaks of Alaska
- Geology of Alaska
