= Mount Dickey =

Mountain in the American state of Alaska

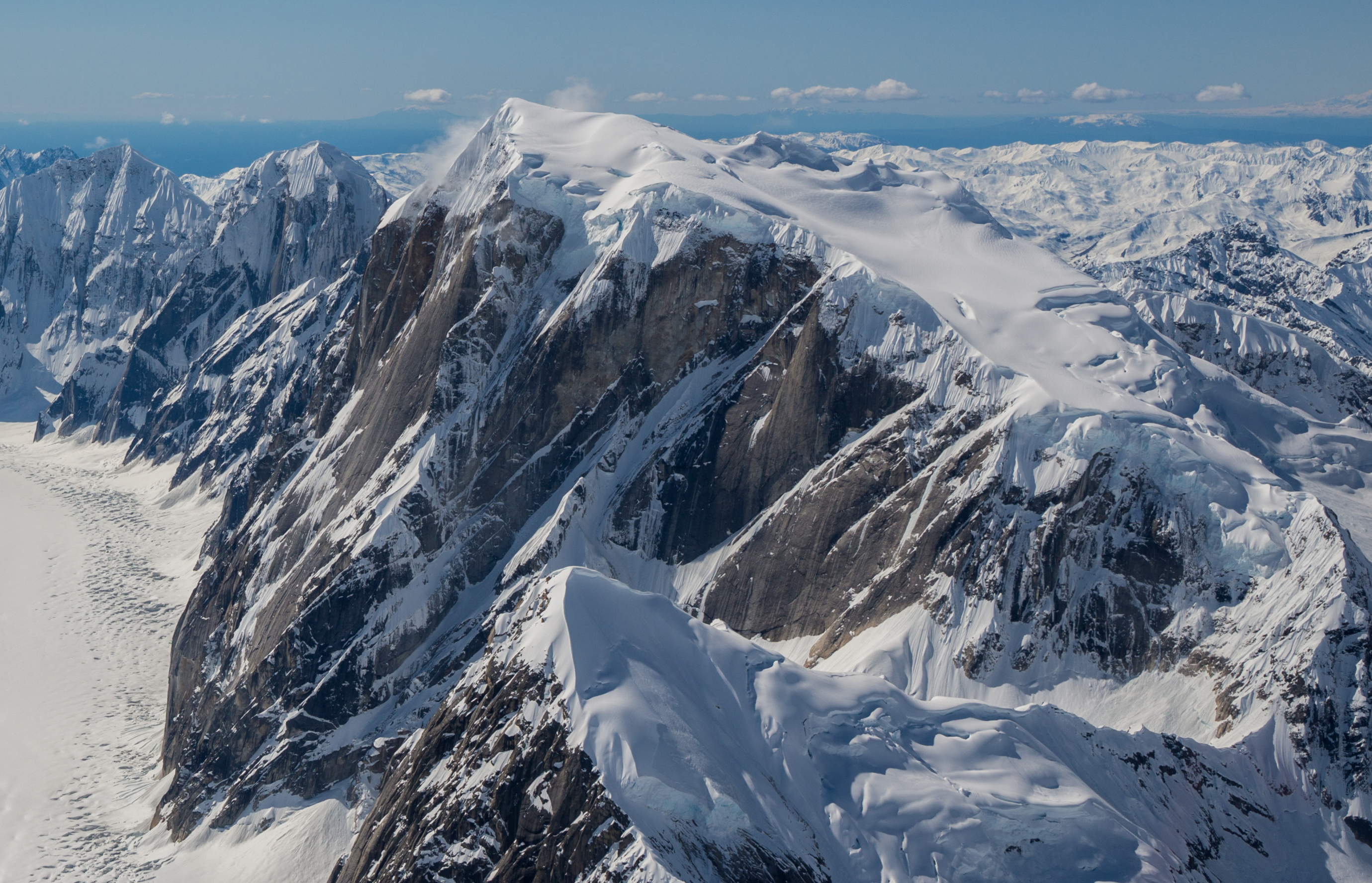
- Aerial view of Dickey seen with top of Mount Barrille at bottom of frame

Highest point
- Elevation: 9,545 ft (2,909 m)
- Prominence: 2,495 ft (760 m)
- Coordinates: 62°56′46″N 150°43′15″W

Geography
- Location within Alaska
- Interactive map of Mount Dickey
- Location: Denali National Park and Preserve, Matanuska-Susitna Borough, Alaska, U.S.
- Parent range: Central Alaska Range

Climbing
- First ascent: April 19, 1955 by David Fisher, Bradford Washburn
- Easiest route: West Face: glacier/snow climb

Mount Dickey is a peak on the west side of the Ruth Gorge in the Central Alaska Range of mountains, 12 miles (19 km) southeast of Denali and 4 miles (6 km) southwest of The Moose's Tooth. Despite its relatively low elevation, it is notable for its east face, which has around a vertical mile (1600 m) of sheer granite—it achieves this vertical gain in less than half a mile (800m) horizontal distance. This is one of the tallest rock walls in the world, and the face has seen many world-class climbs.

Mount Dickey was first climbed on April 19, 1955, by David Fisher and the famous explorer, climber and cartographer Bradford Washburn, via the West Face, which is still the most popular route today. The route begins at a point in the Ruth Gorge southeast of the peak, ascends west under the formidable south face, then turns north and then east to ascend the south side of the gently sloping West Face. This route is relatively straightforward and short for an Alaskan climb (Alaska Grade 1). It is also the most common descent route for those who have climbed the extremely technical routes on the East Face.

Roger Cowles and Brian Okonek made the first winter ascent of Mount Dickey in February 1979.

The first route on the east side of the mountain was climbed in July 1974, by author-mountaineer David Roberts, photographer-mountaineer Galen Rowell, and Ed Ward. Their 5,100 foot (1,554 m) route climbed a pillar on the southeast face; most of their ascent was accomplished over four days. Perhaps the most famous other route on the mountain is the "Wine Bottle Route" on the right side of the east face, climbed in 1988 by Thomas Bonapace and Andreas Orgler. This is an exceptionally technical and long route, 5250 feet (1600 m) high. Other similarly challenging routes have been climbed on the mountain since.

== Climate ==
Based on the Köppen climate classification, Mt. Dickey is located in a subarctic climate zone with long, cold, snowy winters, and mild summers. Temperatures can drop below −20 °C with wind chill factors below −30 °C. The months May through June offer the most favorable weather for climbing or viewing.

== Gallery ==
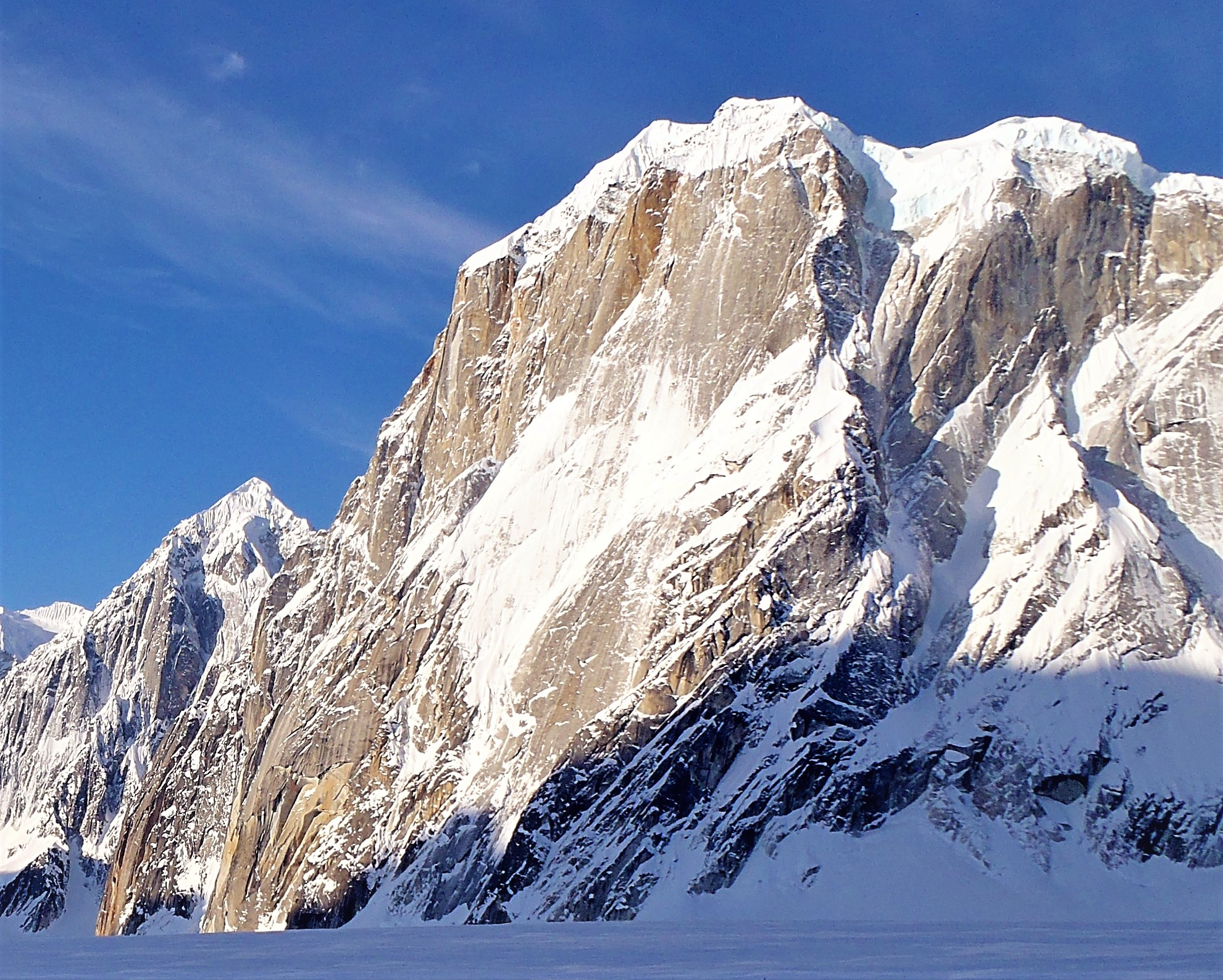

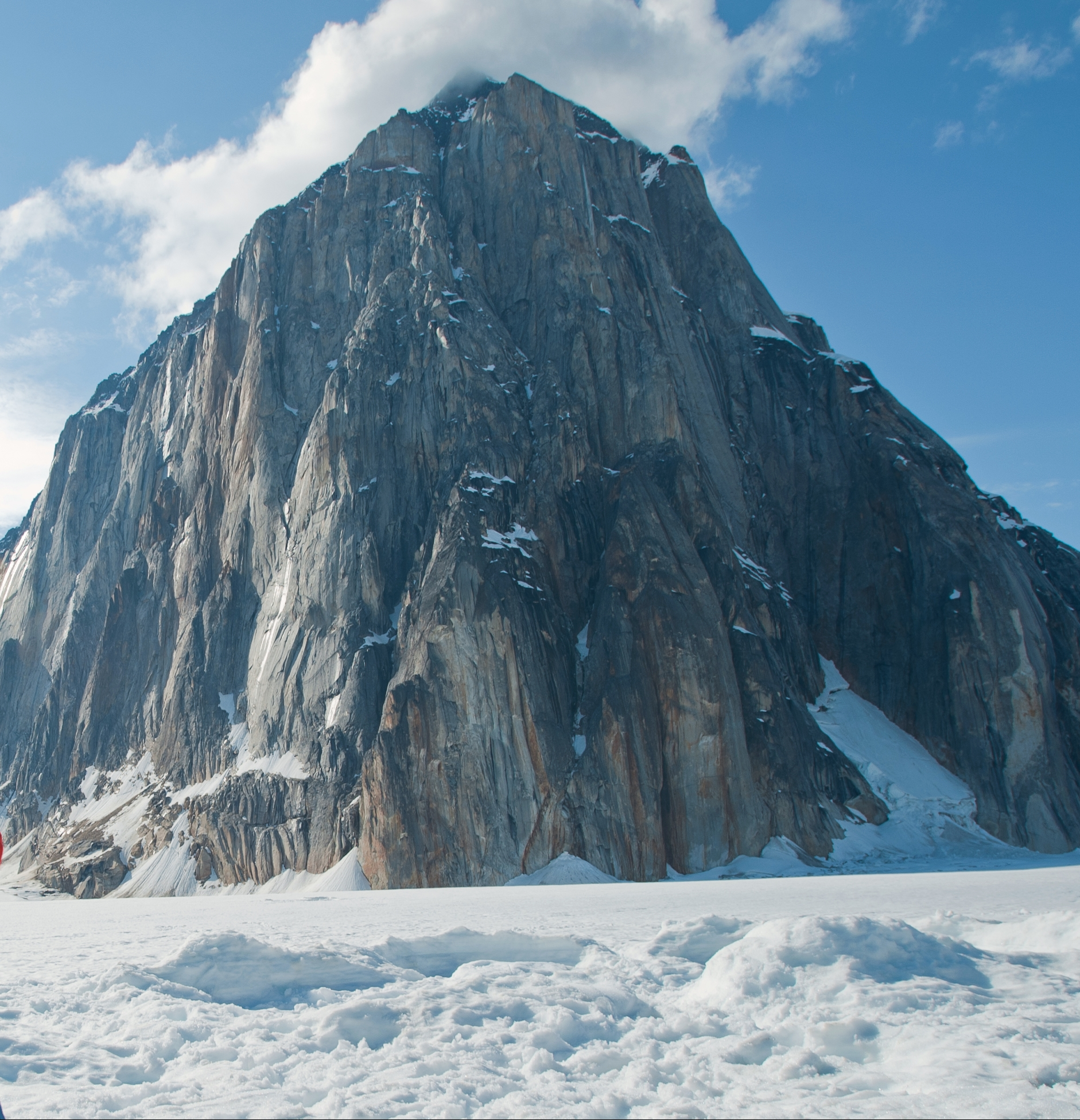
Mount Dickey from Ruth Glacier

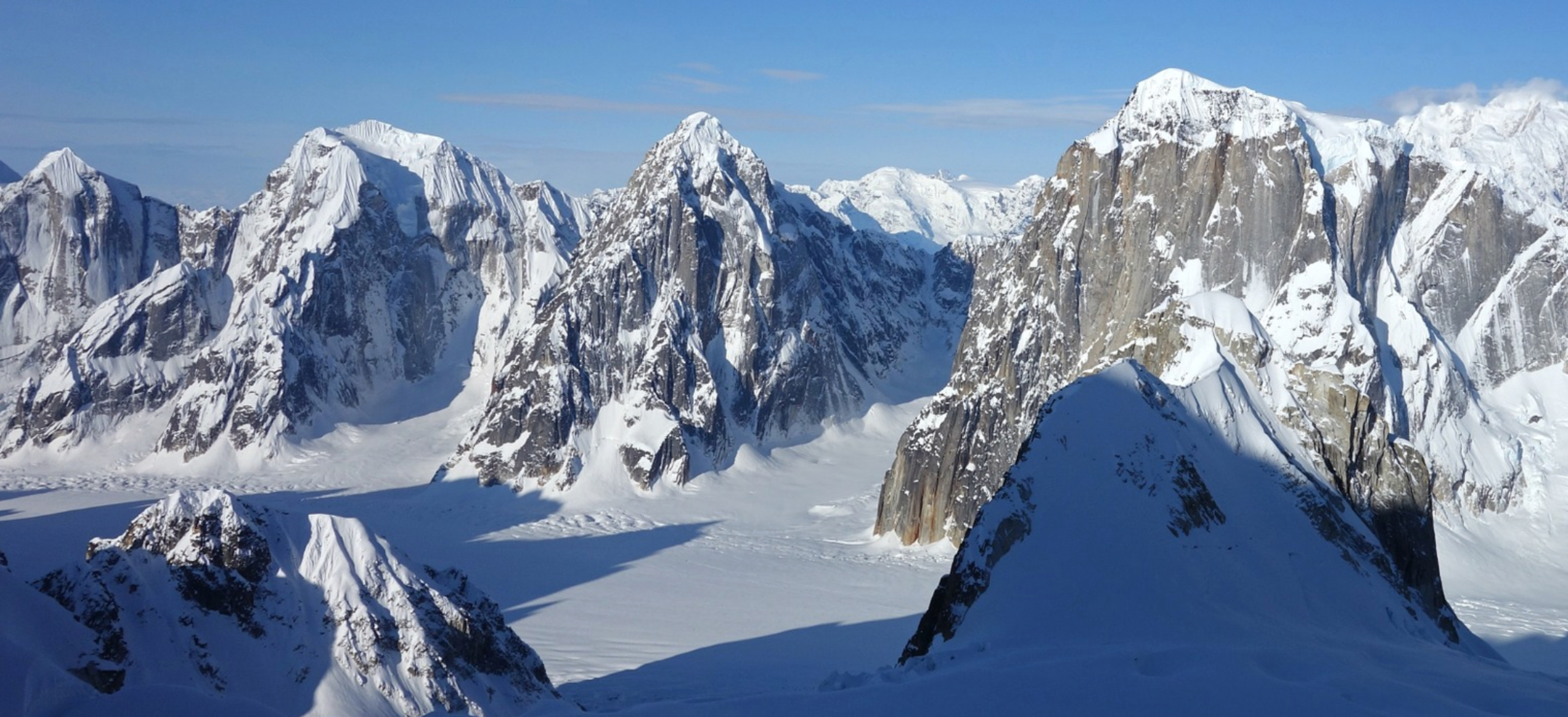
Left to right: Mt. Johnson, Mount Wake, Mount Bradley, and Mount Dickey from the east side of Ruth Gorge

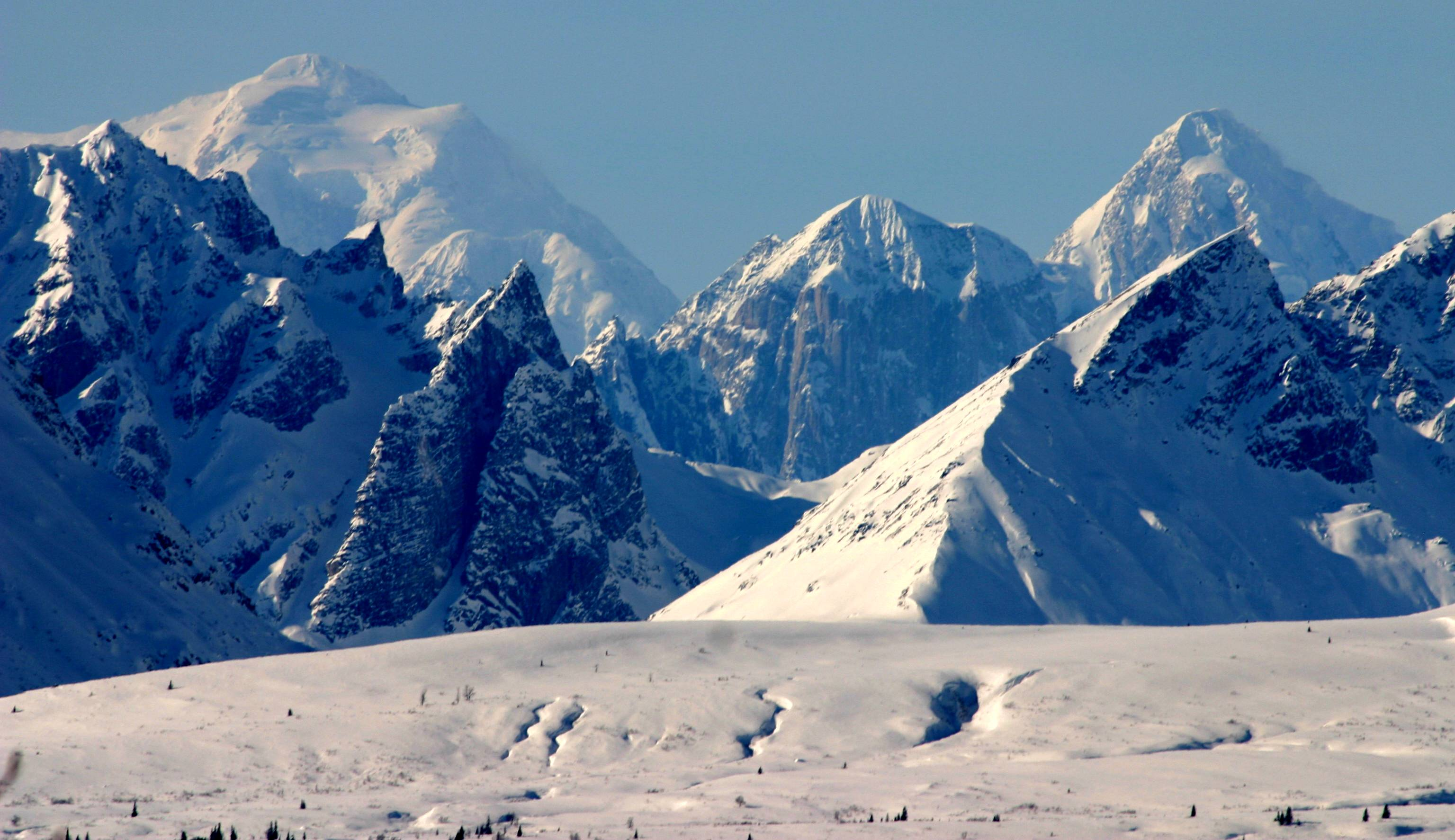
Mount Dickey (center) from Parks Highway. (Hunter left, Huntington right)

== See also ==
- List of mountain peaks of Alaska
- Geology of Alaska

== Sources ==
- American Alpine Journal, 1975, 1980, 1989, 2003.
