= London Tower (Alaska) =

Mountain summit in the Alaska Range, US

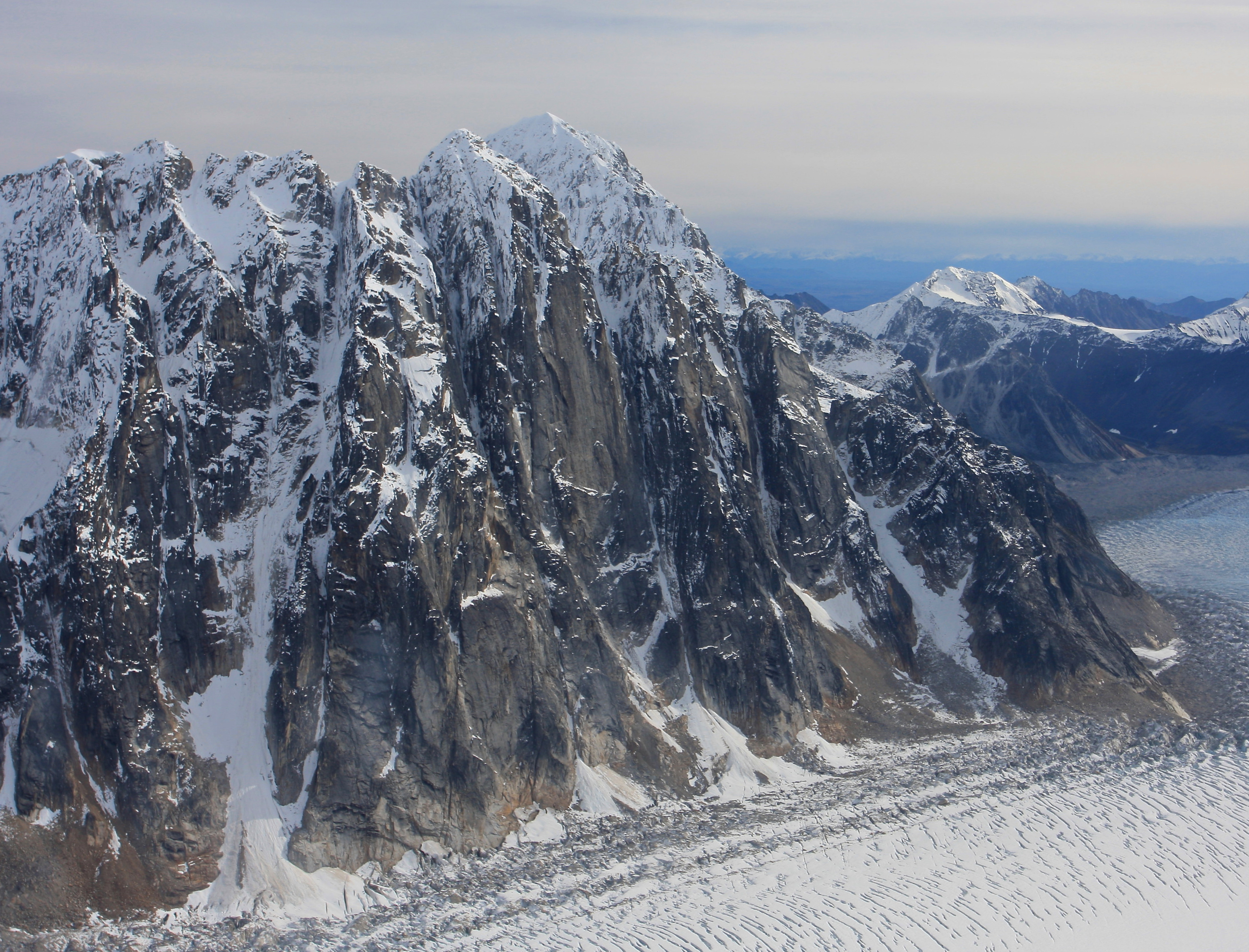
- Aerial view of London Tower

Highest point
- Elevation: 7,550 ft (2,300 m)
- Prominence: 1,132 ft (345 m)
- Coordinates: 62°55′21″N 150°38′45″W

Geography
- Location within Alaska
- Interactive map of London Tower
- Country: United States
- State: Alaska
- Borough: Matanuska-Susitna
- Protected area: Denali National Park
- Parent range: Alaska Range
- Topo map: USGS Talkeetna D-2

Geology
- Rock type: Granite

London Tower is a 7,550 ft (2,300 m) mountain summit located in the Alaska Range, in Denali National Park and Preserve, in Alaska, United States. It is situated on the east side of the Ruth Gorge, 15.23 mi (25 km) southeast of Denali and 3.38 mi (5 km) south of The Moose's Tooth. Mount Bradley rises 2.55 miles (4.10 km) directly across The Great Gorge to the west. Despite its relatively low elevation, it is notable for its west face with over 3,000 feet of vertical granite.

== Climate ==
Based on the Köppen climate classification, London Tower is located in a Tundra climate zone with long, cold, snowy winters, and cool summers. Weather systems are forced upwards by the Alaska Range (orographic lift), causing heavy precipitation in the form of snowfall. Winter temperatures can drop below −20 °F (−29 °C) with wind chill factors below −30 °F (−34 °C). The months May through June offer the most favorable weather for viewing and climbing.

== Gallery ==
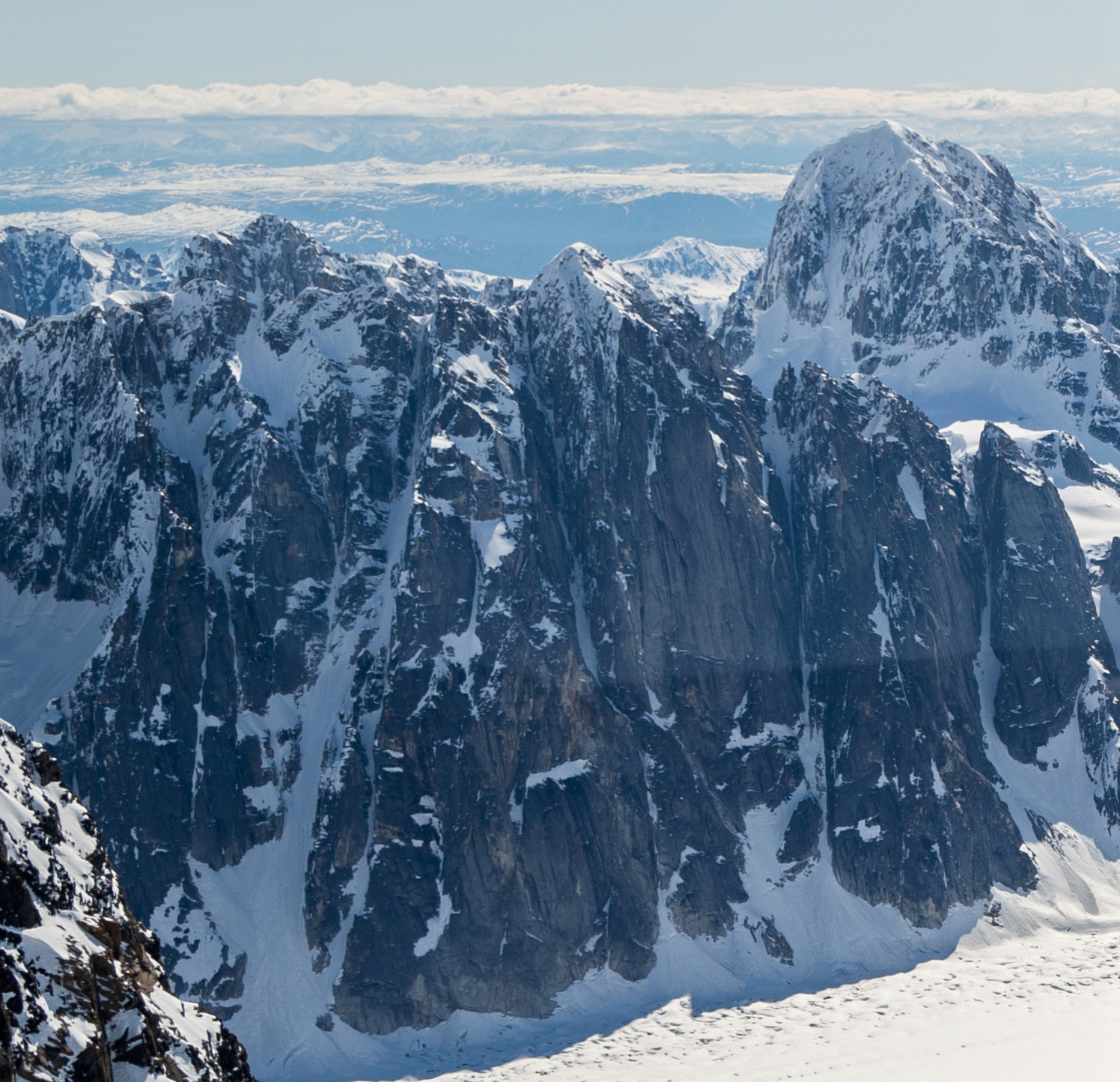
London Tower (center) and Peak 7979 (upper right)

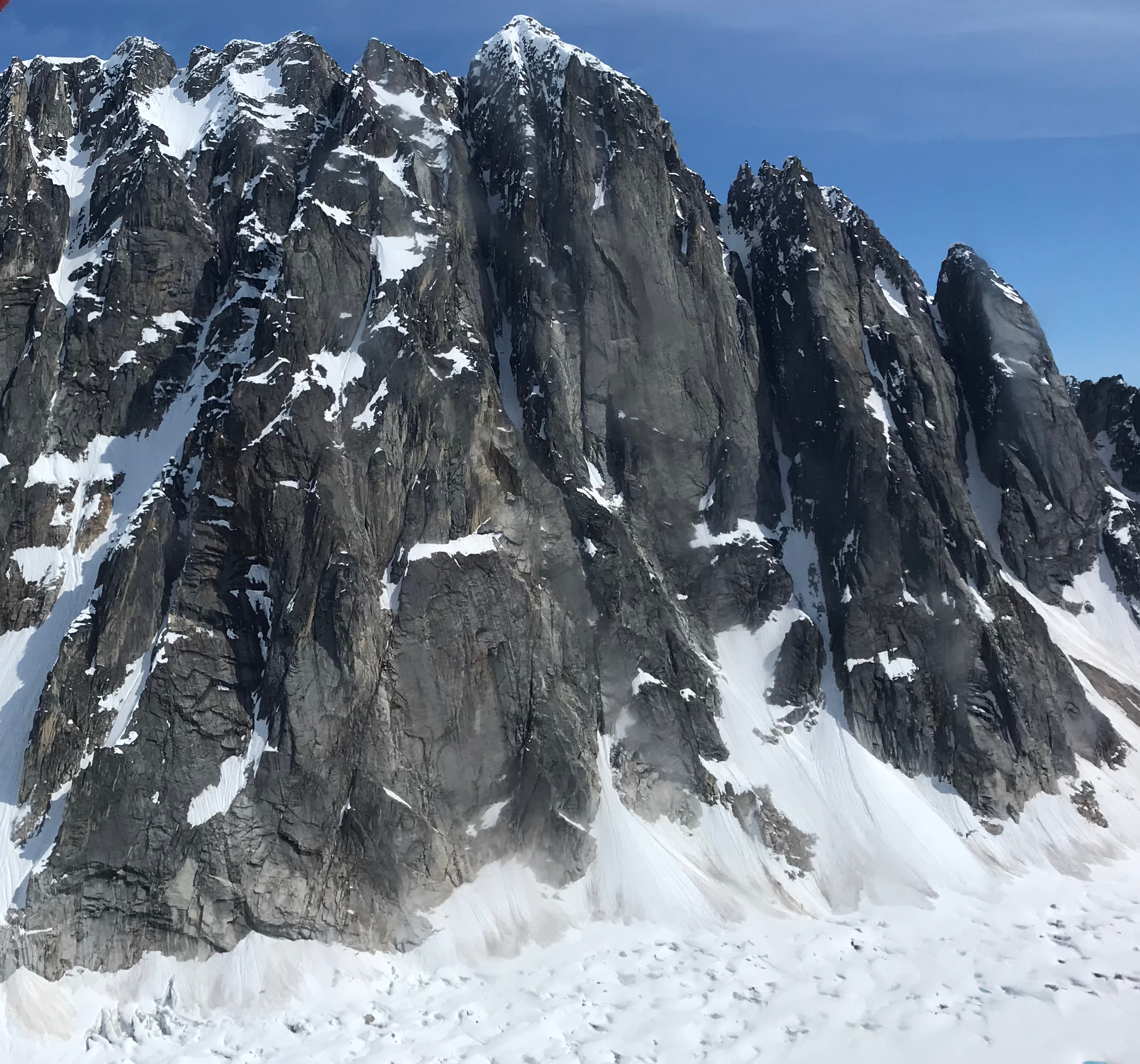
London Tower

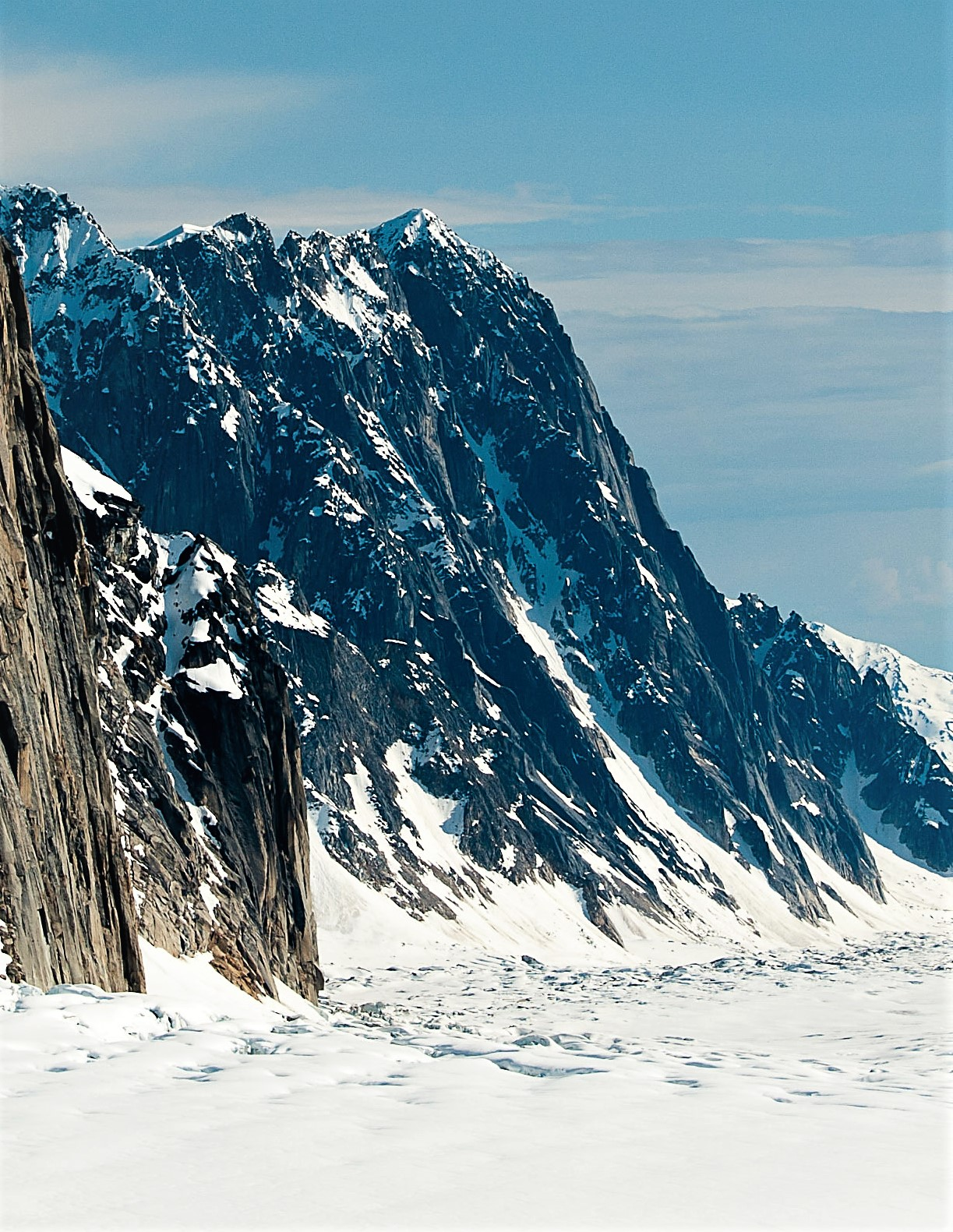

== See also ==
- Mountain peaks of Alaska
- Geography of Alaska
