= Mount Johnson (Alaska) =

Mountain in the American state of Alaska

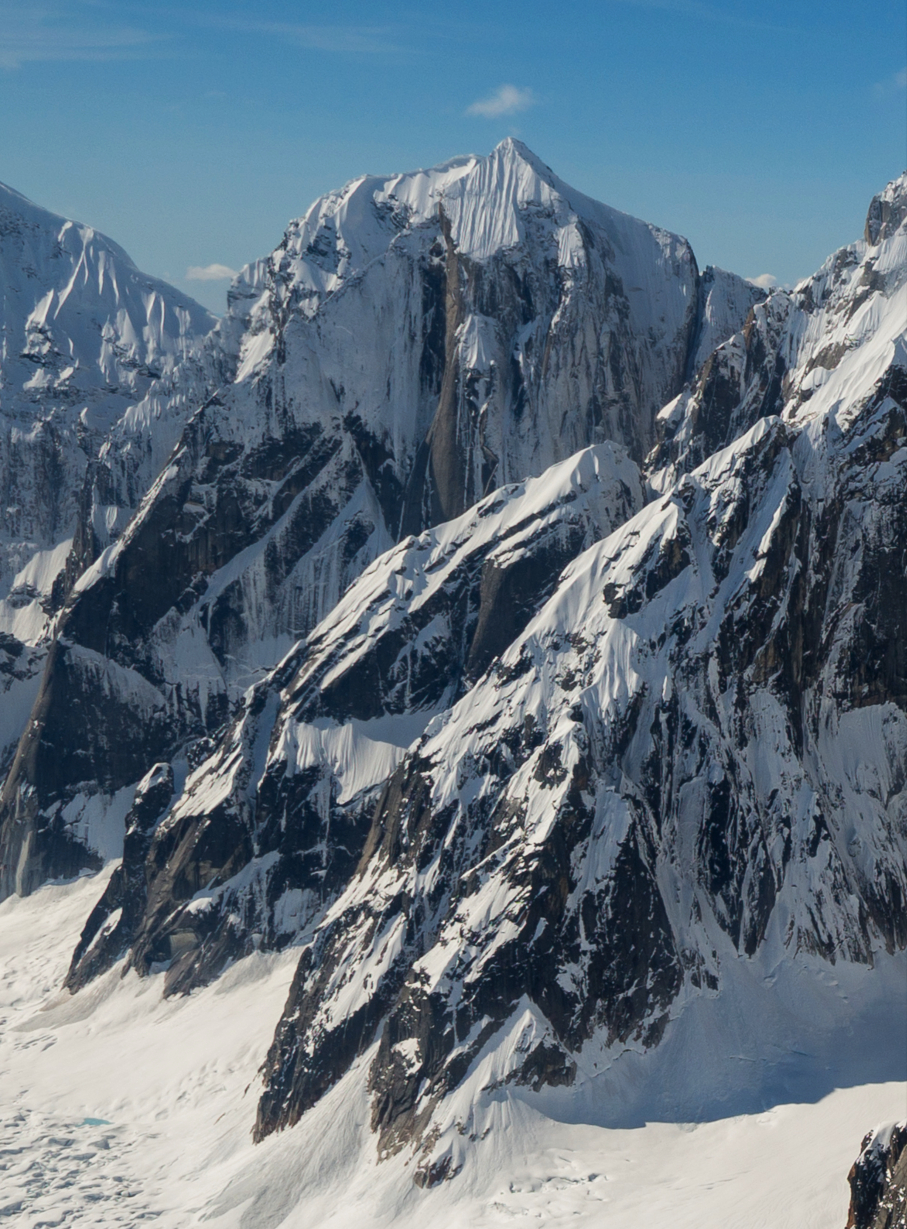
- Aerial view of Mount Johnson

Highest point
- Elevation: 8,400+ ft (2,560+ m)
- Prominence: 1,150 ft (350 m)
- Coordinates: 62°53′41″N 150°42′28″W

Naming
- Etymology: Emory R. Johnson

Geography
- Location within Alaska
- Interactive map of Mount Johnson
- Country: United States
- State: Alaska
- Borough: Matanuska-Susitna
- Protected area: Denali National Park
- Parent range: Alaska Range
- Topo map: USGS Talkeetna D-2

Geology
- Rock type: Granite

Climbing
- First ascent: 1979

Mount Johnson is an 8,400+ ft (2,560+ m) mountain summit located in the Alaska Range, in Denali National Park and Preserve, in Alaska, United States. It is situated on the west side of the Ruth Gorge, 15 miles (24 km) southeast of Denali and six miles (9.7 km) south-southwest of The Moose's Tooth. The nearest higher neighbor is Mount Wake, 0.69 miles (1.11 km) to the northwest.

Despite its relatively low elevation, it is notable for its north face with over 4,000 feet of vertical sheer granite with climbing routes called the Escalator and Stairway to Heaven. The first ascent of the peak was made in 1979 by Gary Bocarde, Charlie Head, John Lee, and Jon Thomas via the south ridge. The mountain was named by famed explorer Dr. Frederick Cook who claimed the first ascent of Mount McKinley in 1906, but was later disproved. Emory Richard Johnson (1864–1950) was the president of the Geographical Society of Philadelphia (1898–1912) at the time that Cook explored Ruth Gorge in 1906.

== Climate ==
Based on the Köppen climate classification, Mount Johnson is located in an alpine climate zone with long, cold, snowy winters, and cool summers. Winter temperatures can drop below −10 °F with wind chill factors below −20 °F. The months May through June offer the most favorable weather for climbing or viewing.

== Gallery ==
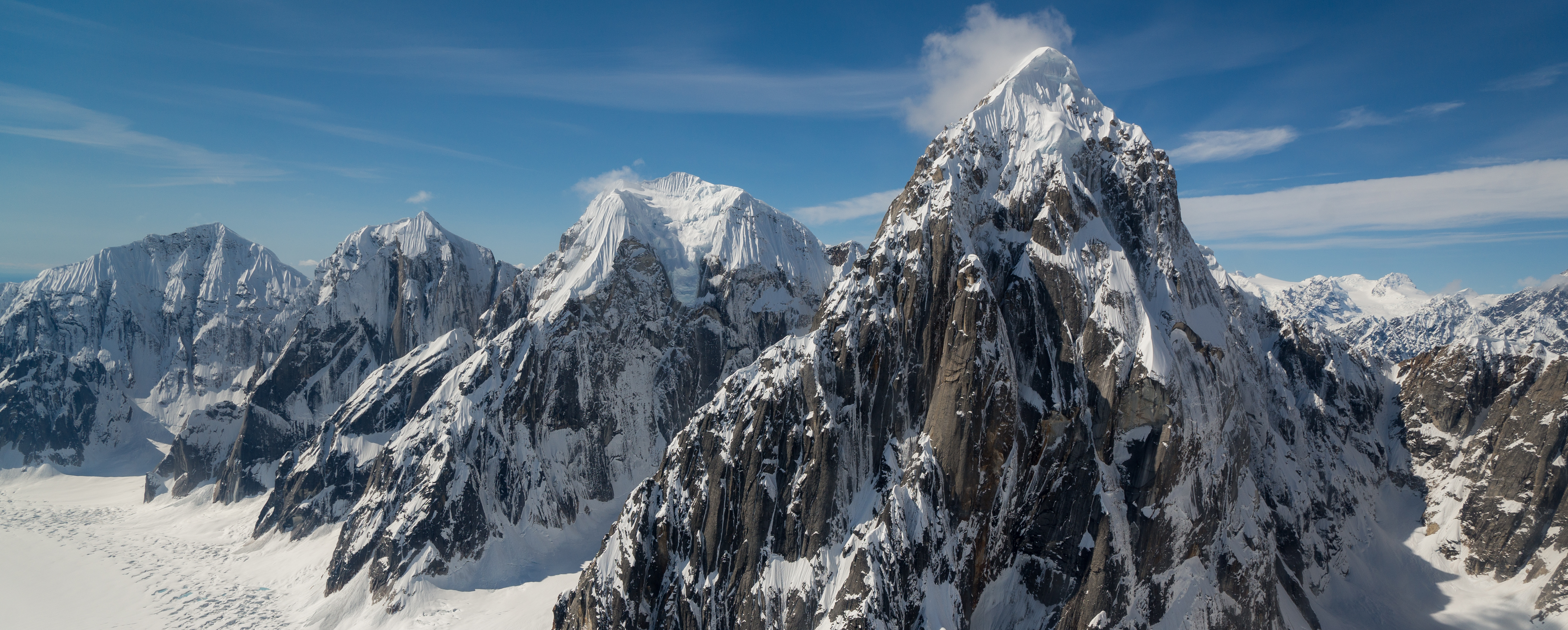
Left to right: Mount Church, Mount Johnson, Mount Wake, and Mount Bradley seen from a flight through Ruth Gorge

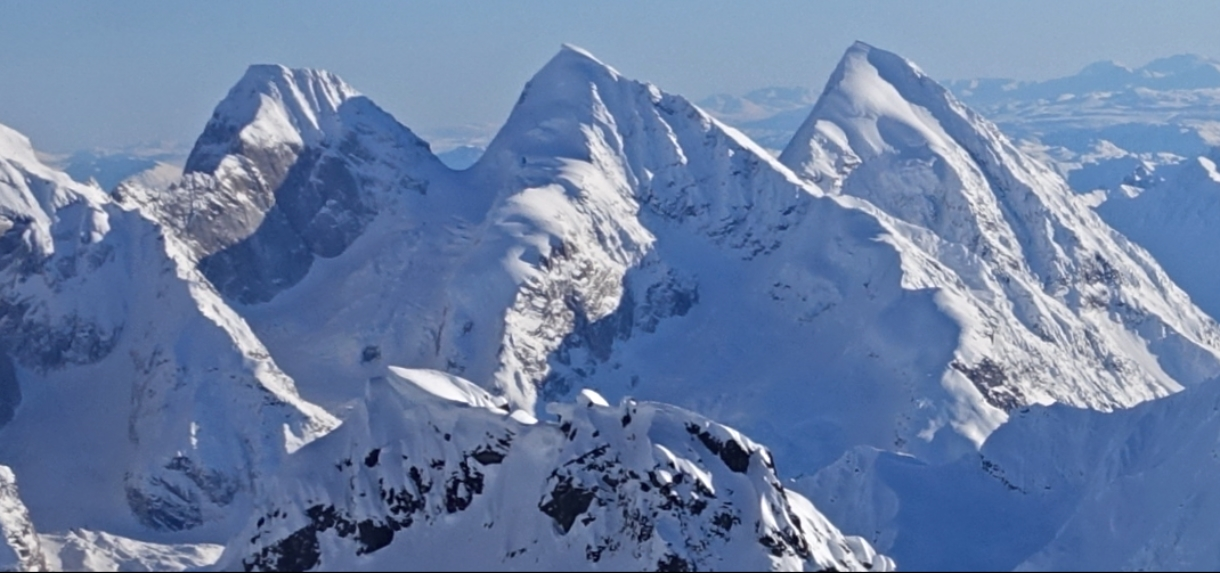
Mt. Grosvenor centered, flanked by Johnson (left), Church (right)
Aerial view from northwest.

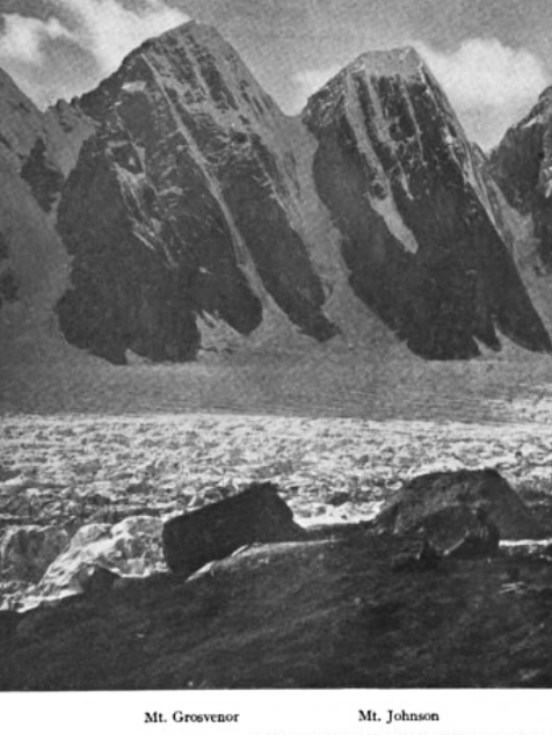
Mts. Grosvenor and Johnson by Frederick Cook circa 1906

== See also ==
- Mountain peaks of Alaska
- Geology of Alaska
