= Ruth Glacier =

Glacier in Alaska

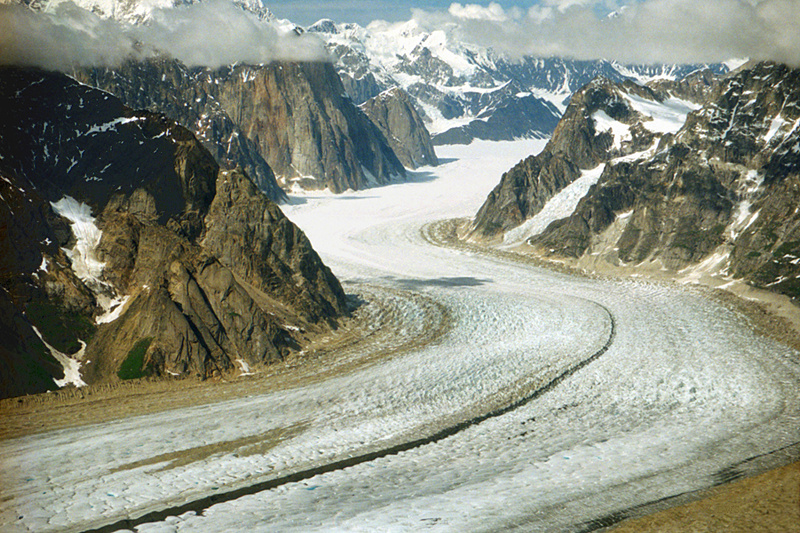
- Ruth Glacier

- Location within Alaska
- Interactive map of Ruth Glacier
- Type: Valley glacier
- Location: Matanuska-Susitna Borough, Alaska, U.S.
- Coordinates: 62°45′55″N 150°37′42″W
- Length: 40 miles (64 km)
- Thickness: 3,800 feet (1,200 m) (1983)
- Terminus: moraine
- Status: unknown

Ruth Glacier is a glacier in Denali National Park and Preserve in the U.S. state of Alaska. Its upper reaches are approximately 3 vertical miles below the summit of Denali. The glacier's "Great Gorge" is one mile wide, and drops almost 2,000 feet (610 m) over 10 miles (16 km), with crevasses along the surface. Above the surface on both sides are 4,900 feet (1,500 m) granite cliffs. From the top of the cliffs to the bottom of the glacier is a height exceeding that of the Grand Canyon. Ruth Glacier moves at a rate of 3 feet (0.91 m) per day and was measured to be 4,000 feet (1,200 m) thick in 1983.

Surrounding the Ruth Gorge are many mountains of the Alaska Range, including the Mooses Tooth, Mount Dickey, Mount Bradley, Mount Wake, Mount Johnson, and London Tower with highly technical ice and rock climbs on their faces.

According to the National Park Service (NPS), several air taxi operators are authorized to land aircraft on Ruth Glacier in Denali National Park.

== History ==
In 1903, the glacier was explored by physician and ethnographer Frederick Cook, who named it after his youngest daughter.

A 2024 open licence research project estimated the Grand Gorge to be the deepest in north America at 8,085 feet (2,464 m).

== See also ==
- List of glaciers
- Fake Peak
