= The Moose's Tooth =

Mountain in the American state of Alaska

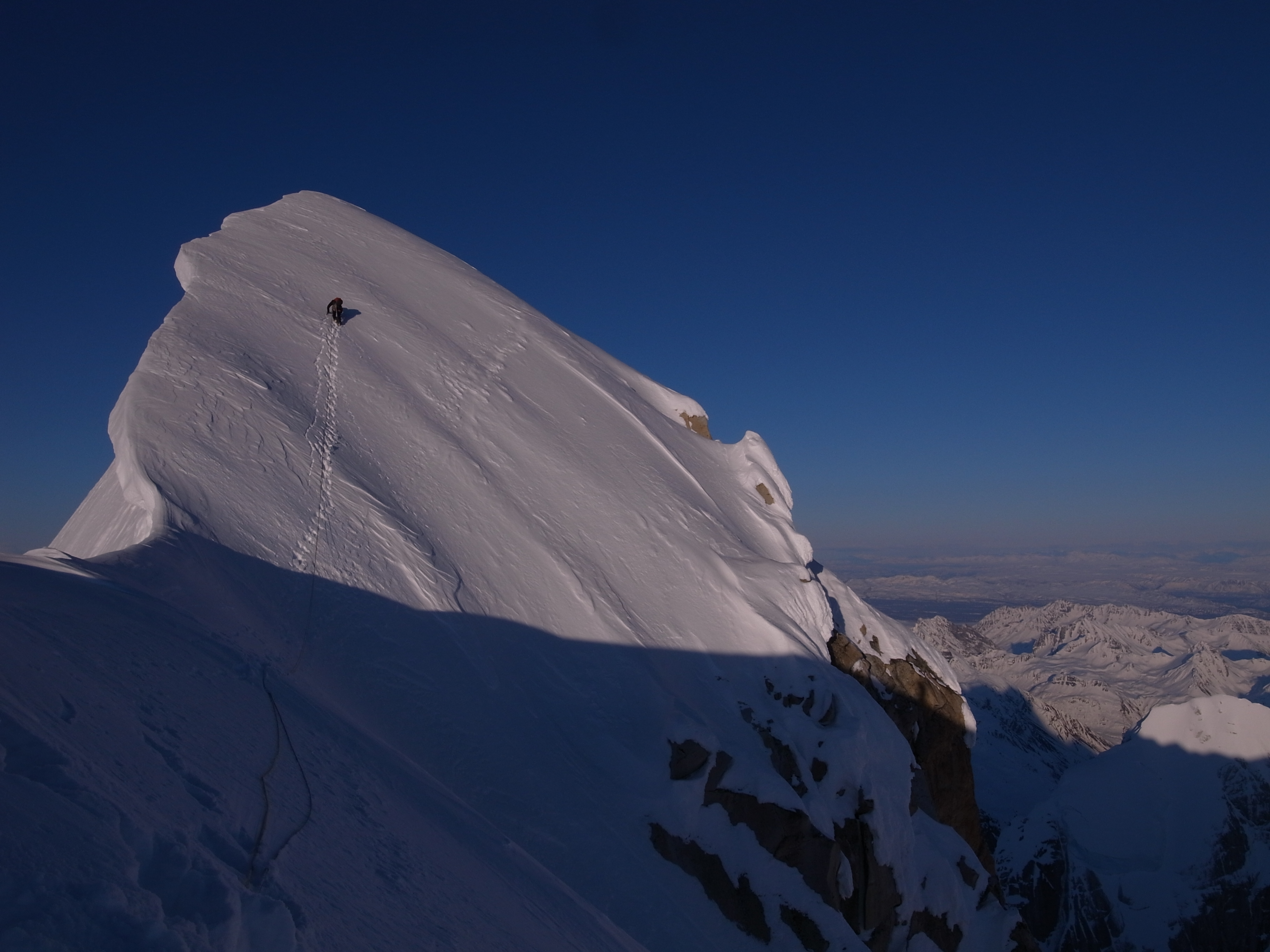

Highest point
- Elevation: 10,335 ft (3,150 m)
- Coordinates: 62°58′09″N 150°36′48″W

Geography
- Location within Alaska
- Interactive map of The Moose's Tooth
- Location: Denali National Park and Preserve, Alaska, US
- Parent range: Central Alaska Range

Climbing
- First ascent: June, 1964 by Welsch, Bierl, Hasenkopf, Reichegger (German)
- Easiest route: Ham and Eggs: rock/snow/ice climb

The Moose's Tooth (or simply Moose's Tooth, Mooses Tooth) is a rock peak on the east side of the Ruth Gorge in the Central Alaska Range, 15 miles (24 km) southeast of Denali. Despite its relatively low elevation, it is a difficult climb. It is notable for its many large rock faces and its long ice couloirs, which are famous in mountaineering circles, and have seen a number of highly technical ascents.

The peak was originally called Mount Hubbard after General Thomas Hamlin Hubbard — the president of the Peary Arctic Club — by Belmore Browne and Herschel Parker. This name was revoked by the United States Geological Survey, which named the peak "The Mooses Tooth," a translation of the Athabascan name for the peak. (Note: That "Moose's Tooth" is a native name for the peak is attested by Bradford Washburn in "Mapping McKinley's Southeast Approaches", American Alpine Journal, 1956, p. 49.) The official USGS name does lack the grammatically correct apostrophe.

The Moose's Tooth is located just to the east of the northern end of the Ruth Gorge, across from Mount Barille and Mount Dickey. It is the chief in a complex of rock peaks with names such as "Eye Tooth", "Sugar Tooth", and "Broken Tooth."

On the east side of this complex lies the head of the Buckskin Glacier, which provides access to climbs on the particularly large and difficult east face of The Moose's Tooth. Other access is from the Root Canal, a glacial landing strip on the south side.

The name of the peak comes from its structure: its summit ridge is a long, low angled ridge running roughly east–west for about a mile, with steep drops to the north and south. This gives the mountain a vague resemblance to a moose's tooth. It also makes climbing to the true (east) summit from the west ridge (the least technical route) very difficult. The summit is more normally reached by steep couloirs on the southwestern side of the peak.

The first ascent of The Moose's Tooth was in June, 1964, by four Germans (Walter Welsch, Klaus Bierl, Arnold Hasenkopf and Alfons Reichegger), via the Northwest Ridge. In June 1974, Gary Bocarde, Michael Clark, Charles Porter, and John Svenson climbed the lower Southwest Summit via the Southwest Face, for the second ascent of the massif, though not of the main summit. They found a great quantity of rotten rock.

In July 1975, Jon Krakauer, Thomas Davies, and Nate Zinsser made the second ascent of the main summit, via a couloir on the south face which they called the "Ham and Eggs Route." This is the most popular route on the mountain today.

== Notable ascents ==
- 1964 Northwest Ridge to main summit: Welsch, Bierl, Arnold Hasenkopf and Reichegger (all German).
- 1974 Southwest Face to southwest summit: Gary Bocarde, Michael Clark, Charlie Porter and John Svenson (all US).
- 1975 Ham and Eggs, couloir on the south face: Jon Krakauer, Tom Davies and Nate Zinsser to main summit, July 16-18th.
- 1981 Dance of the Woo Li Masters, East Face (VI 5.9 WI4+ A4, 1520m) Mugs Stump and Jim Bridwell
- 1997 The Toose's Mooth (north face), Alaska Grade 6: FA by Seth 'S.T.' Shaw and Scott Simper, May 1, 1997.
- 2001 The Beast Pillar, direct start to Dance (VII A5 5.10b WI4+ M6, 1500m): Jim Bridwell and Spencer Pfinsten
- 2013 Bird of Prey, East face (6a, M7+, 90°, A2, 1500 m, one bivouac) : David Lama and Dani Arnold

== Gallery ==
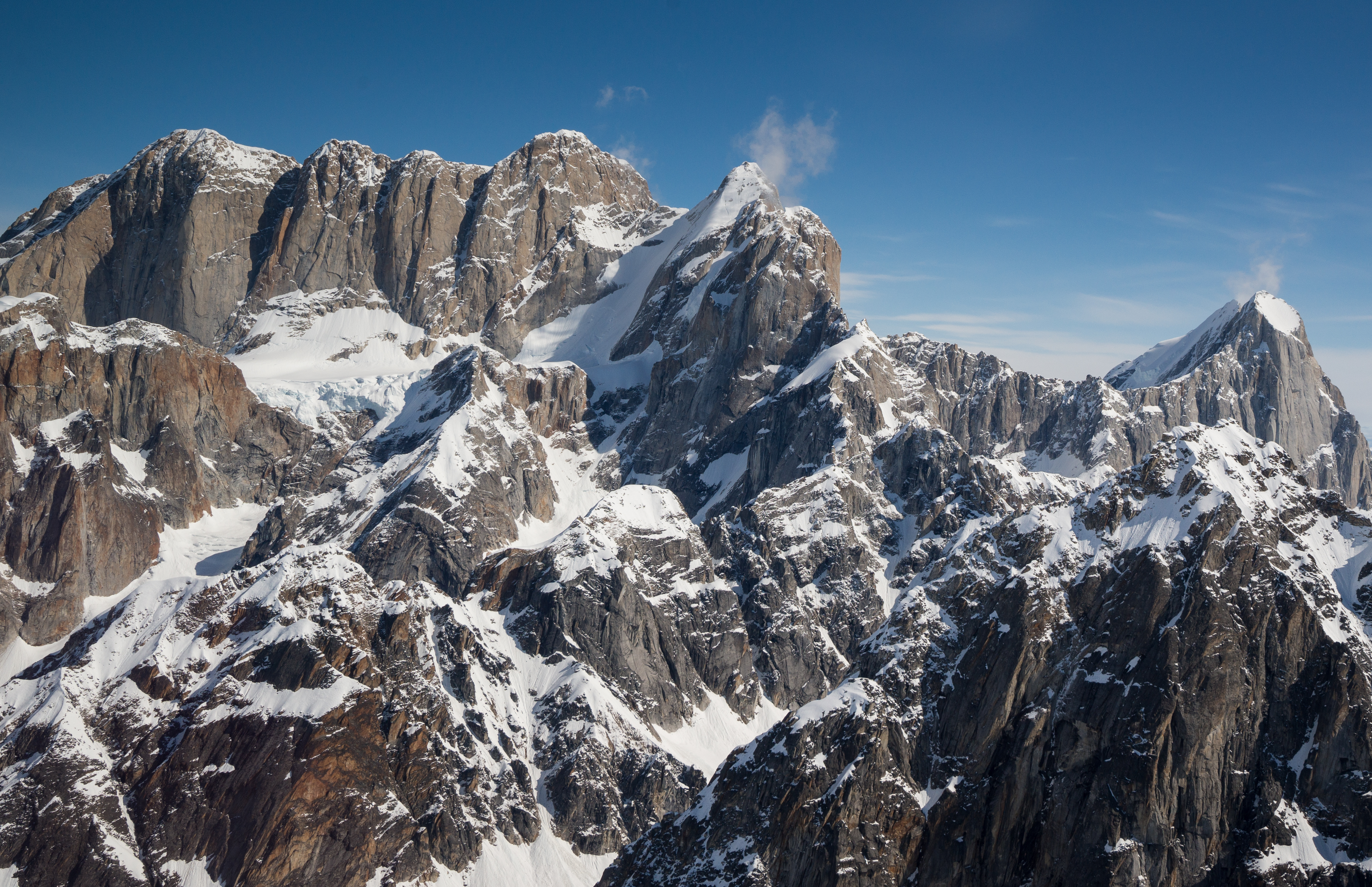
The Moose's Tooth aerial

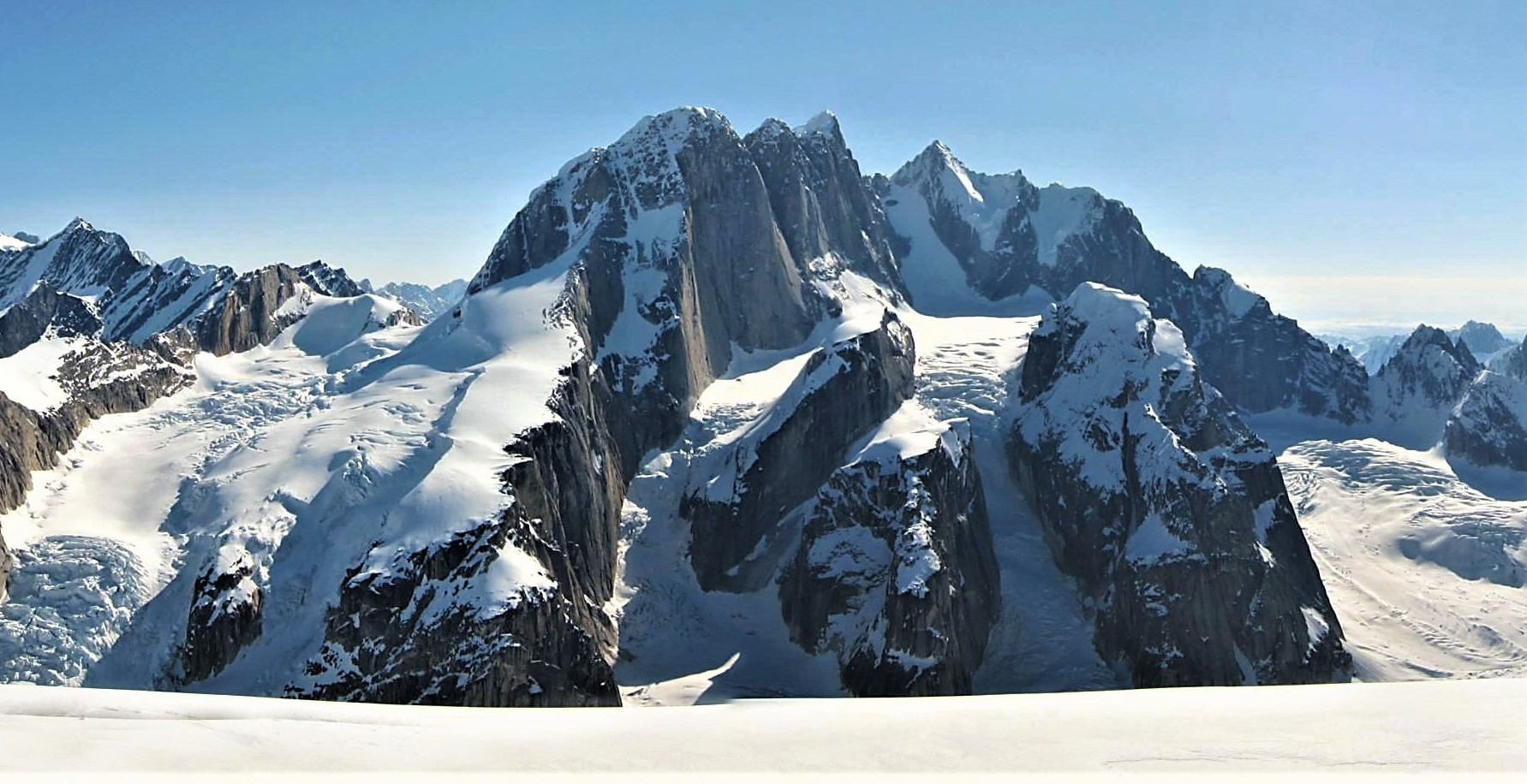
Mooses Tooth from summit of Mount Barrille

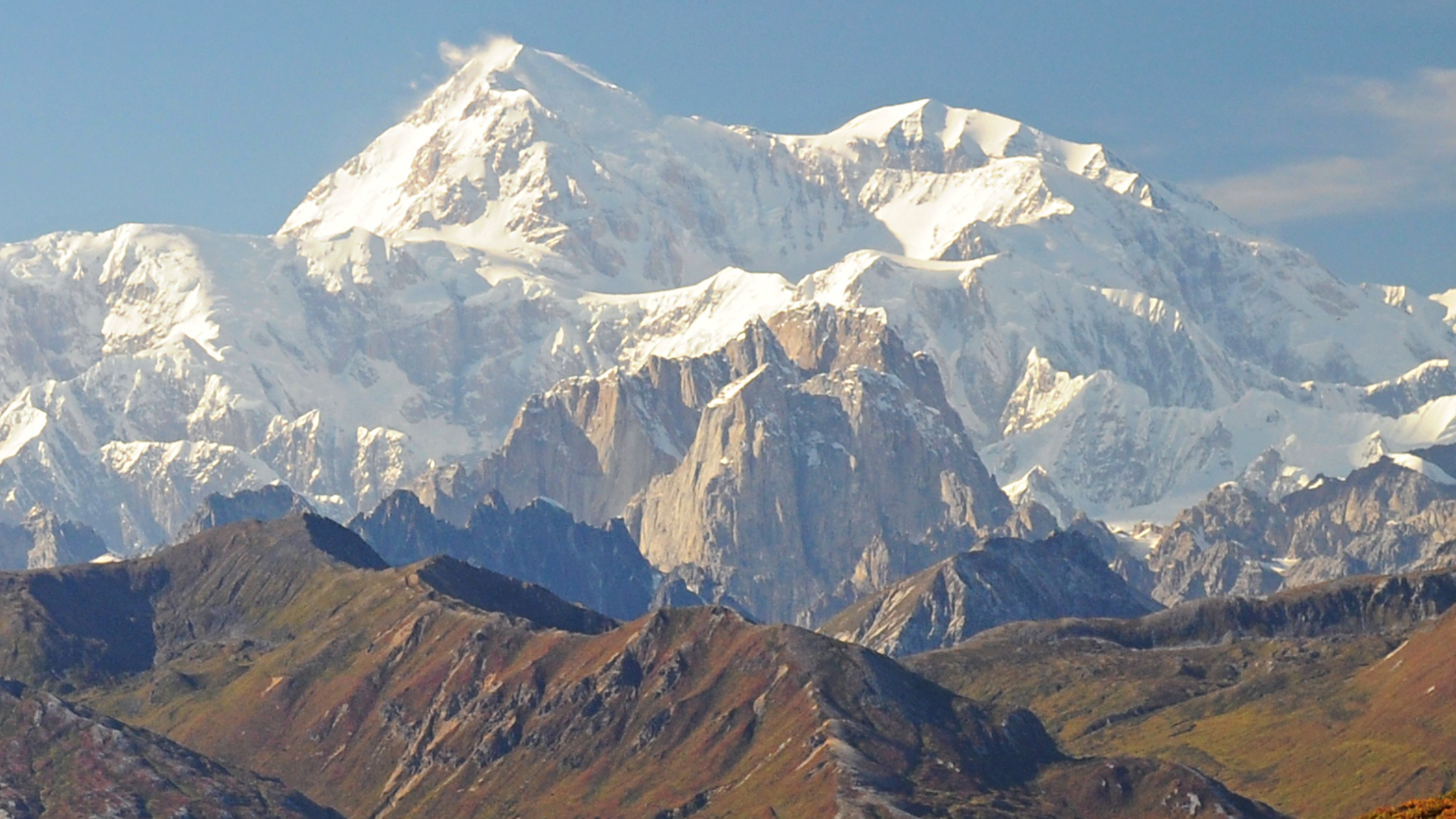
Mooses Tooth centered with Denali behind

== Sources ==
- Joseph Puryear, Alaska Climbing, SuperTopo, 2006.
- Michael Wood and Colby Coombs, Alaska: A climbing guide, The Mountaineers, 2001.
- American Alpine Journal, 1975, 1976.
