= Mount Kudlich =

Mountain in Alaska, United States

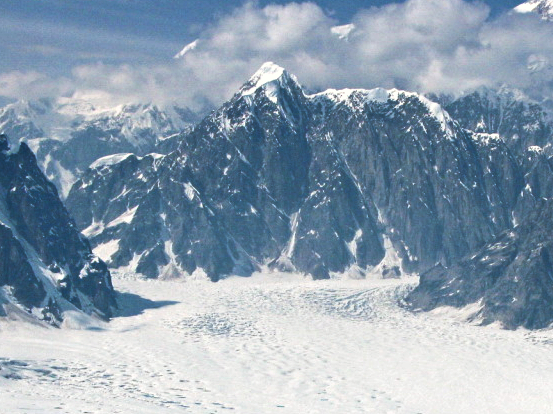
- Aerial view of Mount Kudlich

Highest point
- Elevation: 11,301 ft (3,440 m)
- Prominence: 1,351 ft (412 m)
- Coordinates: 63°00′09″N 150°52′38″W

Geography
- Location within Alaska
- Interactive map of Mount Kudlich
- Location: Denali National Park and Preserve; Matanuska-Susitna Borough; Alaska, United States
- Parent range: Alaska Range
- Topo map: USGS Mount McKinley A-2

Geology
- Rock type: Granite

Climbing
- First ascent: 1968 by Niklaus Lotscher and Heinz Alleman
- Easiest route: class 5.8 Southwest Ridge

Mount Kudlich is an 11,301 ft (3,440 m) mountain summit located in the Alaska Range, in Denali National Park and Preserve, in Alaska, United States. Mount Kudlich is also referred to as Peak 11,300. It is situated 4,000 feet above the confluence of the West and Northwest Forks of Ruth Glacier, on the west side of the Don Sheldon Amphitheater, 6.15 mi (10 km) southeast of Denali, 2.5 mi (4 km) north of Mount Huntington, and 3 mi (5 km) west-southwest of Mount Dan Beard. The mountain was possibly named by explorer Belmore Browne for Herman C. Kudlich (1861-1946), City Magistrate of New York and member of the American Museum of Natural History. Belmore Browne participated in Frederick Cook's 1906 expedition which claimed the first ascent of Denali, but was later disproved.

== Gallery ==
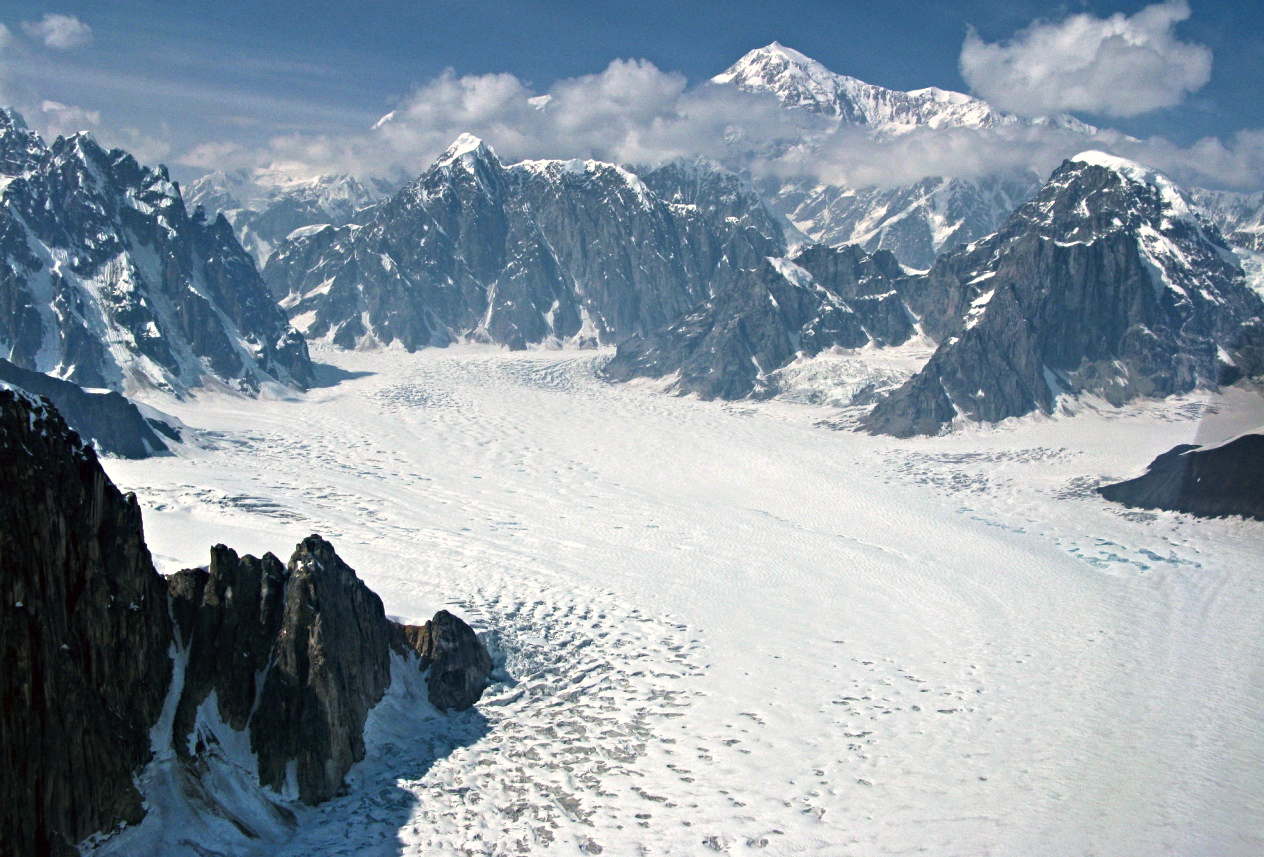
Don Sheldon Amphitheater (formerly Ruth Amphitheater) surrounded by The Rooster Comb, Mount Kudlich, Denali, and Mount Dan Beard
