= James L. Clark =

James Lippitt Clark (18 November 1883 in Providence, Rhode Island – 1969) was a distinguished American explorer, sculptor and scientist.

Following his studies at the Rhode Island School of Design and his training at the Gorham Silver Company, he worked at the American Museum of Natural History in New York. In 1908, he spent time studying wildlife in Wyoming, and then traveled to Africa with Arthur Radclyffe Dugmore to take photographs for Collier's Weekly. On this trip Clark produced the "first film to record African wildlife." He brought back specimens for hunters like Theodore Roosevelt and for American museums. He returned regularly to Africa and also traveled to Asia to collect zoological specimens. Clark was a member of the National Sculpture Society, the New York Zoological Society, and the American Geographical Society.

== American Museum of Natural History ==
Footage from the 1926 Morden - Clark Asiatic Expedition of the American Museum of Natural History

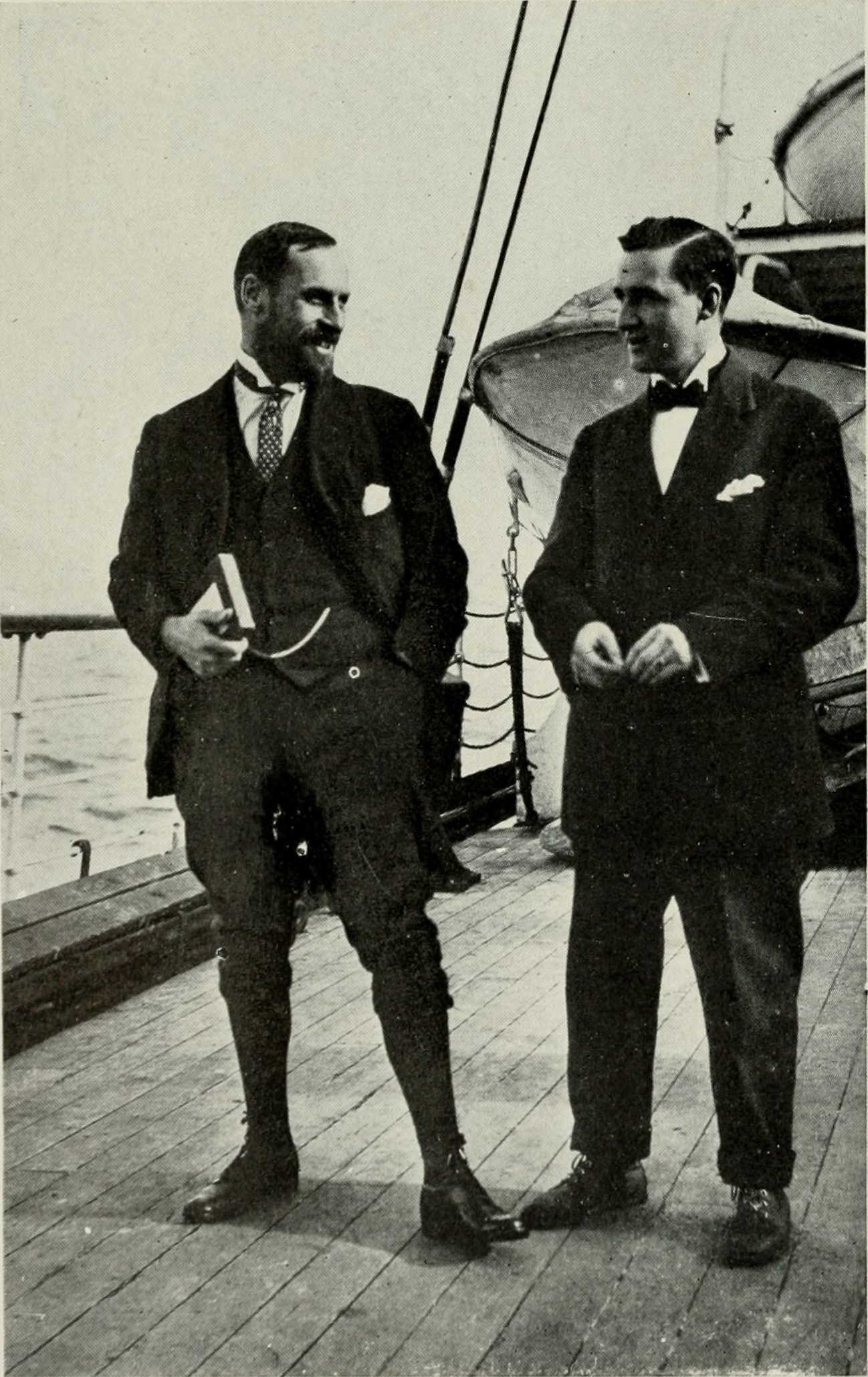
Dugmore (left) and Clark (right) on the way to Africa

In 1902, director of the American Museum of Natural History Harmon C. Bumpus hired Clark, who was known for his skill in animal sculpture. While working in the employ of John Rowley, Clark sketched animals at the Central Park Zoo and the Bronx Zoo. Bumpus wanted to develop a staff at the AMNH capable of producing the realistic, natural displays that Carl Akeley had created as Chief Taxidermist at the Field Museum from 1896 to 1909. Akeley was considered to be the "father of modern taxidermy". He was persuaded to mentor Clark and they became lifelong friends as well as colleagues.

Akeley had developed a new lifelike taxidermy method in which the animal's musculature was sculpted over the skeleton. A lightweight mannequin was then cast from the sculpted body and the tanned skin adhered to it. Clark and Akeley both had great talent; they loved nature, art, and working on all things mechanical ... Clark returned to the AMNH and kept in constant communication with Akeley, adopting Akeley's taxidermy method of sculpting animals bodies, creating mannequins, and adding skin.

— Peabody Museum of Natural History 2010

In 1926, with Carl Akeley's untimely death, Clark took on the leadership role in terms of the AMNH's projects including the construction of the diorama halls, the Vernay Asiatic Hall, the Akeley African Hall, the Birds of the World and Ocean Life halls. He was co-director of the Morden-Clark Asiatic expedition and for a number of years he was with Akeley in Africa. As an expert taxidermist he was responsible for some of the most notable groups that are on display in New York. He was also a sculptor and made some distinguished studies of wild animals.

In 1934, eight years after Akeley's death, his influence was still strongly felt at the AMNH, where he was considered to be a diorama expert. Clark, Henry Fairfield Osborn and William R. Leigh were "transforming the museum exhibits" in the early 1930s. Others included Francis Lee Jaques, Robert Rockwell, Belmore Brown, Carl Rungius, and Hanson Puthuff.

In 1966 Clark published the book Good Hunting: Fifty Years of Collecting and Preparing Habitat Groups for the American Museum.

== Dugmore-Clark safari ==
Clark's friend Arthur Radclyffe Dugmore was planning a photo-safari in November 1908 to photograph big game in advance of the President's much-publicized 1909-1910 Smithsonian–Roosevelt African Expedition. Clark offered to join Dugmore as his bodyguard, although he had never fired a rifle in his life.

The Dugmore-Clark safari was full of adventure and close scrapes photographing charging rhinos and lions prowling in the night. There was an impetuous and dangerous buffalo hunt in swamps with high grass and no visibility or cover. At another point, Clark fell ten feet into an elephant trap and miraculously missed sharp, poisoned bamboo stakes on the way down. It seems lucky indeed that Clark and Dugmore survived this first bold encounter with Africa.

— Peabody Museum of Natural History 2010

The Dugmore-Clark safari overlapped with the former president's safari on several occasions. Dugmore returned to the United States in the late spring of 1909 and Clark stayed on for another six months spending time with Akeley and through him, Roosevelt.

== Boy Scouts recognition ==
Clark was a former president of the Camp-Fire Club of America and in 1927, the Boy Scouts of America made Clark an Honorary Scout, a new category of Scout created that same year. This distinction was given to "American citizens whose achievements in outdoor activity, exploration and worthwhile adventure are of such an exceptional character as to capture the imagination of boys ...". The other eighteen who were awarded this distinction were Roy Chapman Andrews; Robert Bartlett; Frederick Russell Burnham; Richard E. Byrd; George Kruck Cherrie; Merian C. Cooper; Lincoln Ellsworth; Louis Agassiz Fuertes; George Bird Grinnell; Charles A. Lindbergh; Donald B. MacMillan; Clifford H. Pope; George Palmer Putnam; Kermit Roosevelt; Carl Rungius; Stewart Edward White; Orville Wright.

== See also ==
- Adventurers' Club of New York
- List of wildlife artists
