= Handbook for Boys =

The Handbook for Boys may be:

- The American Boy's Handy Book, 1890 handbook of activities intended for boys
- Boy Scout Handbook, Boy Scouts of America
