= Arthur Radclyffe Dugmore =

Welsh-American naturalist and photographer (1870–1955)

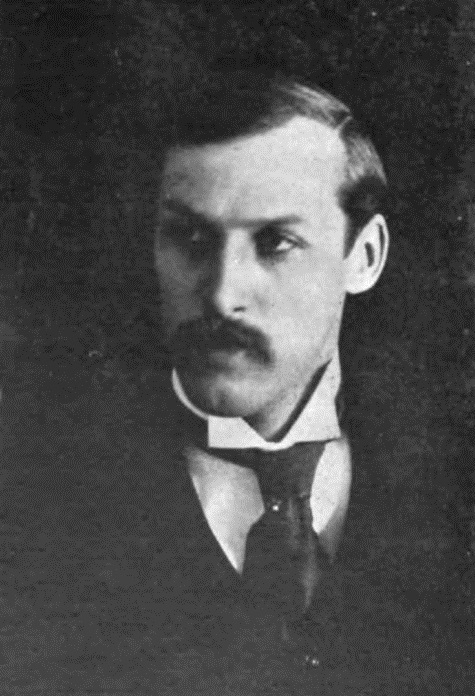
A. Radclyffe Dugmore

Arthur Vaux Venner Radclyffe Dugmore (1870–1955) was a Welsh-born American naturalist and wildlife photographer, painter, print-maker and author. He turned from "hunting to capturing his subjects on paper and canvas."

== Early life ==
Dugmore was born December 25, 1870, in Bodalog, near Betws-y-Coed, Wales, the second son of Captain Francis Sandys Dugmore and Emily Evelyn, a daughter of William Brougham, 2nd Baron Brougham and Vaux. His father served in The Queen's Own Rifles of Canada before his birth, and later in the 64th Regiment of Foot. Dugmore was educated at Elizabeth College, Guernsey, and later in Kadıköy and Bournabat (in modern day Turkey). He studied painting at the Instituto di Belle Arti in Naples, and went to America in 1889. In 1901 he was married to Henrietta Louise Watkins, and with her had three children.

He was elected to The Camera Club of New York in 1902 and presented his work in their exhibitions. In 1902 Dugmore's photography caught the attention of Alfred Stieglitz, the single most important figure in American photography at that time, who published Dugmore's article entitled "Effective Lighting in Bird Photography" and his photogravure of small birds on a branch as illustration in the first issue of Stieglitz' quarterly photographic journal Camera Work. Stieglitz explained that he had chosen Dugmore's photograph because it demonstrated that "even scientific subjects may be given pictorial worth without loss to their scientific value." His photographs were exhibited in London in 1903 at the Royal Photographic Society annual show. In 1905 his work was included in the Lewis and Clark Centennial Exposition held in Portland, Oregon. Dugmore designed the cover for Country Life in America three times in 1906 and in 1907 and 1908, his thirteen-part series entitled "The Amateur Photographer" was published in the magazine. In 1909 and 1911 his articles were published in the American Annual of Photography.

Dugmore, the naturalist and sportsman, took part in photo-safaris in Newfoundland in 1907, Kenya in 1909-1910 and back to Newfoundland in 1913. In 1908 Dugmore and James Lippit Clark undertook the Dugmore/Clark photo safari to Africa where Clark took photographs for Collier’s Weekly. On that voyage Clark produced the first film on African wildlife and brought specimens back for hunters including Theodore Roosevelt and for American museums. He joined the Royal Photographic Society in 1912 and gained his Fellowship in 1913. In 1913 Dugmore published his own illustrated book based on this safari, Camera Adventures in the African Wilds about his trip to Kenya. In the same year he published his illustrated book based on his Newfoundland experiences, The Romance of the Newfoundland Caribou. In this publication Dugmore declared that the, Newfoundland caribou stag, "is perhaps the handsomest of all the Caribou, even though he is not the largest and does not carry the longest horns. Not only is he a thoroughly handsome creature, but his life is unusually full of interest."

In 1917, Dugmore served as a speaker at the Connecticut Woman Suffrage Association convention and predicted that women in England would soon have equal suffrage.

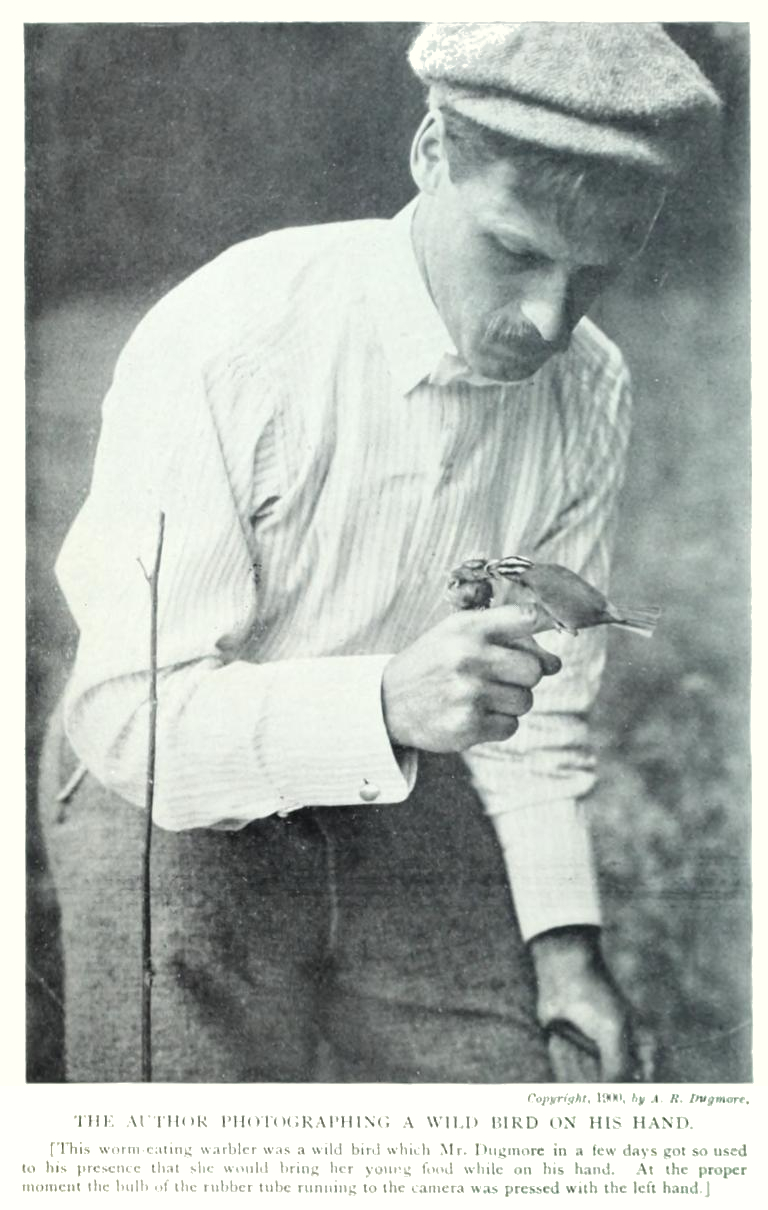
c. 1900

In 1923, he gave a talk, "Photographing Wild Animals", on the London-based radio station 2LO, a forerunner to the BBC. A transcript was published in the very first issue of The Radio Times.

Dugmore studied painting at the Bell' Arte in Naples and at the Academy of Design in New York. He undertook the scientific study of natural history to be able to depict wild life through his art. He first exhibited his paintings in 1914. By 1931 Dugmore was known for his films "The Wonderland of Big Game" and "The Vast Sudan" as well as his many books on wild animals. In 1931 M. Knoedler & Company in Chicago hosted an exhibition of Dugmore's paintings which included studies of animals of Kenya, Canada and Newfoundland.

In 1921 Dugmore visited the Ngorongoro Crater in Tanzania with Sir Charles Ross and the first Game Laws were introduced there. Ross had first visited the Crater while on safari where many rhino, lions, and other large game were shot. He was able to purchase a farm near there after World War I and once he owned property there he "took measures to reduce hunting and protect the animals, many of which were migratory."

== World War I ==
Dugmore was already forty two years old when the war started. As a civilian photographer he traveled to the battle front and began recording with his cine camera, as the small Belgian army attempted in vain to stem the advance of the German Army. He recorded his eye-witness experience in his publication When the Somme Ran Red: The Experiences of an Officer of the King's Own Yorkshire Light Infantry During the First World War. Dugmore's influential friends helped him "to obtain a commission in an infantry regiment—the King's Own Yorkshire Light Infantry", The 'Tykes'. Dugmore served in the trenches during the period leading towards the First Battle of the Somme but he became incapacitated and no longer fit for duty after he was gassed. He wrote from the front lines during this period describing trench warfare, the Somme attack and its consequences and aftermath. Dugmore later created a number of paintings based on his recollections of experiences on the Somme.

== Post WWI ==
"The artist wrote and illustrated works including The Vast Sudan, 1924; and In the Heart of the Northern Forests, published in 1930." From his base in New York, his career flourished. Lowell Thomas published a biography of Dugmore in 1931 entitled Rolling Stone: The Life and Adventures of Arthur Radclyffe Dugmore. Thomas traced the steps of scientist and adventurer Dugmore's steps through Africa, Labrador and Russia and No Man's Land.

== List of publications ==
- Lanier (1842-1881), Sidney; Day, Charles; Dugmore (illustrations), Arthur Radclyffe (1899), Bob the story of our mocking-bird, p. 124
- Dugmore, Arthur Radclyffe (1902), Nature and the Camera; How to Photograph Live Birds and Their Nests; Animals, Wild and Tame; Reptiles; Insects; Fish and Other Aquatic Forms; Flowers A book of photography.
- Dugmore, Arthur Radclyffe (1920) [1903], Bird homes The nests eggs and breeding habits of the land birds breeding in the eastern United States with hints on the rearing and photographing of young birds
- Dugmore, Arthur Radclyffe (1910), Camera Adventures in the African Wilds A book of photography.
- Dugmore, Arthur Radclyffe (1912), Wild life and the camera A book of photography.
- Dugmore, Arthur Radclyffe (1913), The romance of the Newfoundland caribou, Philadelphia: Lippincott, p. 191 Full-text.
- Dugmore, Arthur Radclyffe (1912), Wild Life and the Camera, Kessinger Publishing, p. 438
- Dugmore, Arthur Radclyffe, When the Somme Ran Red: The Experiences of an Officer of the King's Own Yorkshire Light Infantry During the First World War See Leonard
- Dugmore, Arthur Radclyffe (1914), The romance of the beaver being the history of the beaver in the western hemisphere
- Dugmore, Arthur Radclyffe (1918), Adventures in Beaver Stream Camp
- Dugmore, Arthur Radclyffe (1924), The Vast Sudan Illustrated with photographs from life and drawings by the author.
- Dugmore, Arthur Radclyffe (1930), In the Heart of the Northern Forests, London: Chatto and Windus, p. 242 with 64 plates. The wonders of beaver engineering. In the Canadian Rocky Mountains. The moose of eastern North America. The passing of the caribou of Newfoundland. The North American porcupine. Peculiarities of the American opossum. Animal behavior. Photography of animals. Zoology. North America.
- Rungius, Carl; Bonheur, Rosa; Knight, Charles Robert; Dugmore, Arthur (1930), Gallery of wild animal paintings in the Zoological park / from the collection of the New York zoological society, New York Zoological Society Carl Rungius (1869-1959), Rosa Bonheur (1822-1899), Charles Robert Knight (1874-1953), A. Radclyffe Dugmore, A. Radclyffe (1870-1955).
- Dugmore, Arthur Radclyffe (1930), The Autobiography of a Wanderer, Hurst & Blackett, Limited, p. 279

== Paintings ==
- Dugmore, Arthur Radclyffe (1916), Troops Going over the Top, First World War (Battle of the Somme), York Museums Trust Oil on canvas, 46 x 81 cm. Accession number: YORCM : DA1417
- Dugmore, Arthur Radclyffe (1916), Tiger in the Jungle, Russell-Cotes Art Gallery & Museum Oil on canvas, 56 x 76.3 cm Accession number: BORGM 00719. Purchased from the artist in 1945

== Etchings ==
- Dugmore, Arthur Radclyffe (nd), "Untitled Cape Buffalo", Meadowlark Gallery, Billings, Montana Signed Etching. 8.25 inches high by 10.25 inches wide.
