= Daniel Carter Beard =

American artist and writer (1850–1941)

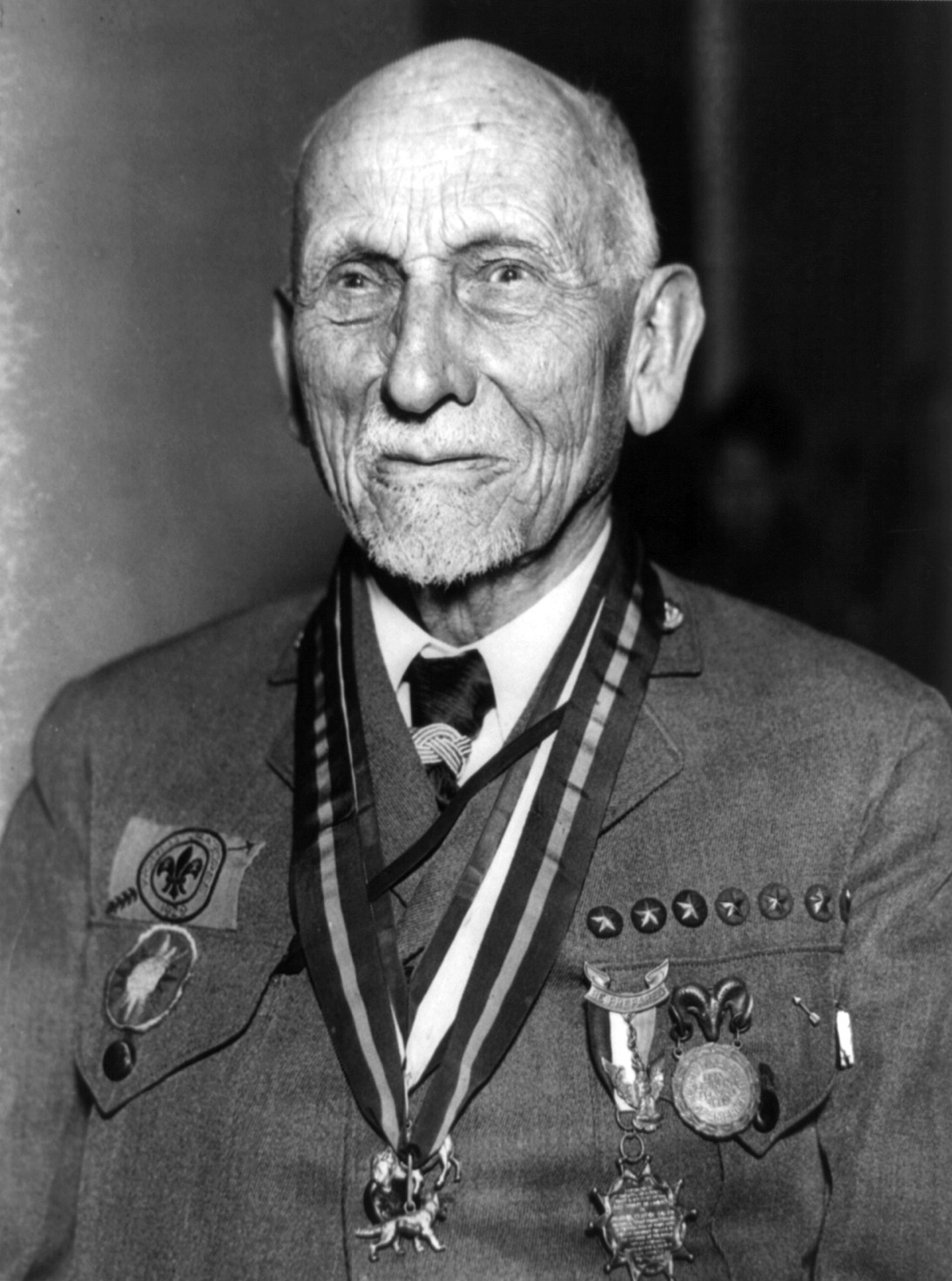
- Beard in 1930
- Born: June 21, 1850; Cincinnati, Ohio, US
- Died: June 11, 1941 (aged 90); Suffern, New York, US
- Resting place: Brick Church Cemetery; Spring Valley, New York, US
- Other name: Uncle Dan
- Occupations: Illustrator; author; social reformer
- Known for: Founding pioneer of the Boy Scouts of America
- Awards: Silver Wolf Award (1924); Silver Buffalo Award (1926); Honorary Alpha Phi Omega brother

Daniel Carter "Uncle Dan" Beard (June 21, 1850 – June 11, 1941) was an American illustrator, author, youth leader, Georgist and social reformer who founded the Sons of Daniel Boone in 1905, which Beard later merged with the Boy Scouts of America (BSA).

== Early life ==
Beard was born on June 21, 1850, in Cincinnati, to a family of artists. As a youth in Painesville, he explored the woods and made sketches of nature. His father was the artist James Henry Beard and his mother was Mary Caroline (Carter) Beard. His uncle was the artist William Holbrook Beard. He lived at 322 East Third Street in Covington, Kentucky near the Licking River, where he learned the stories of Kentucky pioneer life.

He started an early career as an engineer and surveyor. He attended art school in New York City. He wrote a series of articles for St. Nicholas Magazine that later formed the basis for The American Boy's Handy Book. He was a member of the Student Art League, where he met and befriended Ernest Thompson Seton in 1883. He illustrated a number of books for Mark Twain, and for other authors such as Ernest Crosby.

In 1886, Daniel Carter Beard joined Henry George's Single-tax movement and became a strong advocate of the Georgist philosophy. He wrote several novels about the subject (such as Moonblight and Six Feet of Romance). With Mark Twain's approval, Beard's illustrations for A Connecticut Yankee in King Arthur’s Court were a Georgist interpretation of the story.

On August 15, 1894, Beard wed Beatrice Alice Jackson, with whom he had two children, Daniel and Barbara.

In 1908, while living in Redding, Connecticut, Beard was among those on hand to welcome Mark Twain upon his arrival to the author's new villa Stormfield.

Beard became the editor of Recreation magazine launched by his friend George O. Shields and wrote a monthly column for youth. He founded the Sons of Daniel Boone in 1905, basing it on American frontier traditions. He later moved his column to Woman's Home Companion. After conflicts with a new editor, he moved to the Pictorial Review. Since Women's Home Companion retained the rights to the name, he simply renamed the organization to Boy Pioneers of America.

Beard was a longstanding and influential member of the Camp-Fire Club of America.

== Scouting ==
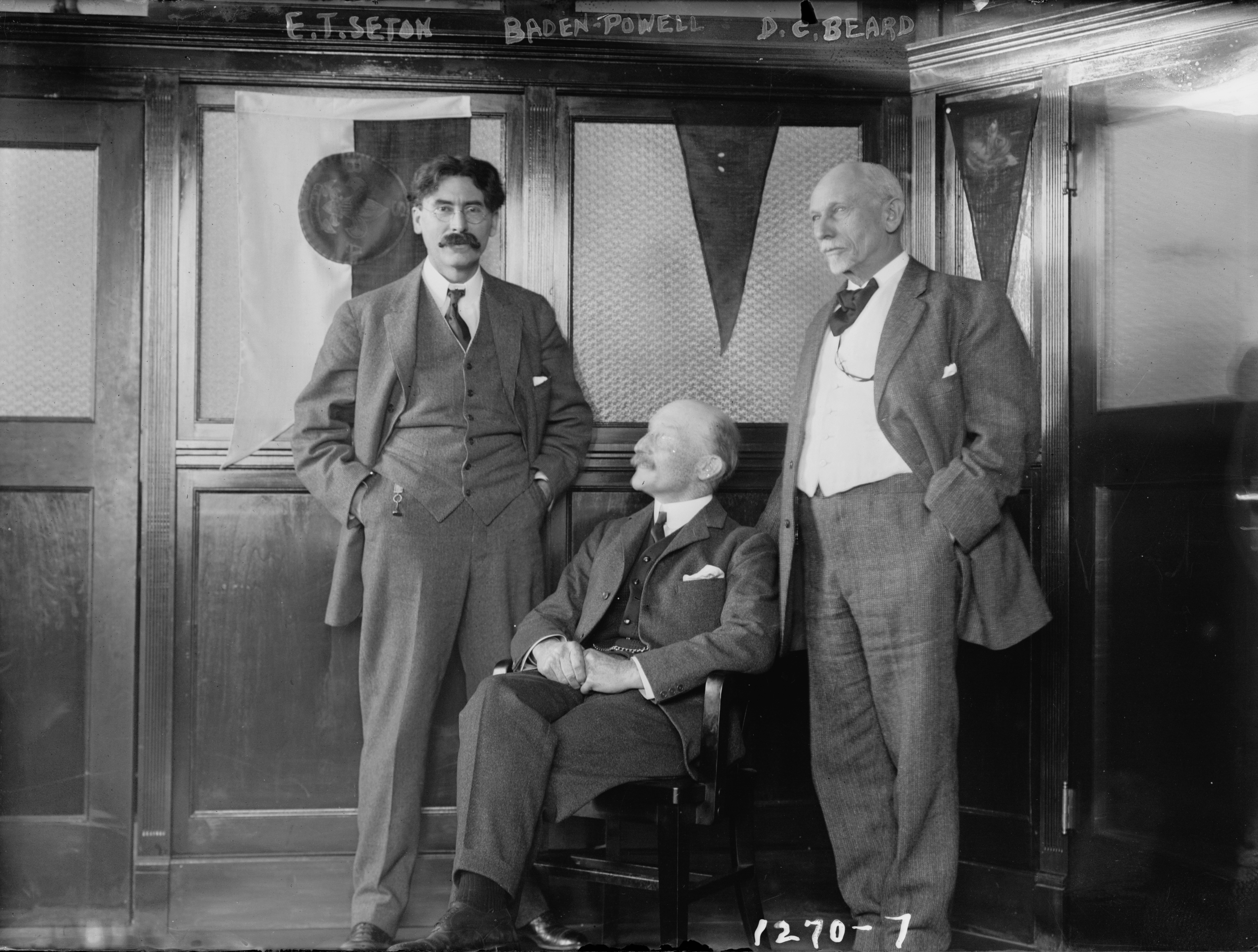
Beard (right) with Scouting founder Robert Baden-Powell (seated) and Ernest Thompson Seton (left)

Beard merged his organization into the Boy Scouts of America when it was founded in 1910. He became one of the first National Scout commissioners of the Boy Scouts and served it for 30 years. He later became the editor of Boys' Life magazine, the BSA official magazine, and wrote a monthly column for youth. The work of both Beard and Ernest Thompson Seton are in large part the basis of the Traditional Scouting movement.

Beard also helped his sister organize the Camp Fire Girls. Beard was a Freemason, initiated in the Mariners Lodge No. 67 (New York City). An award for Masonic Scouters has been named in his honor.

Beard founded Boy Scout Troop 1 in Flushing, New York, which is believed to be one of the oldest continuously chartered Boy Scout Troops in the United States. He became an Eagle Scout at the age of 64 on February 15, 1915.

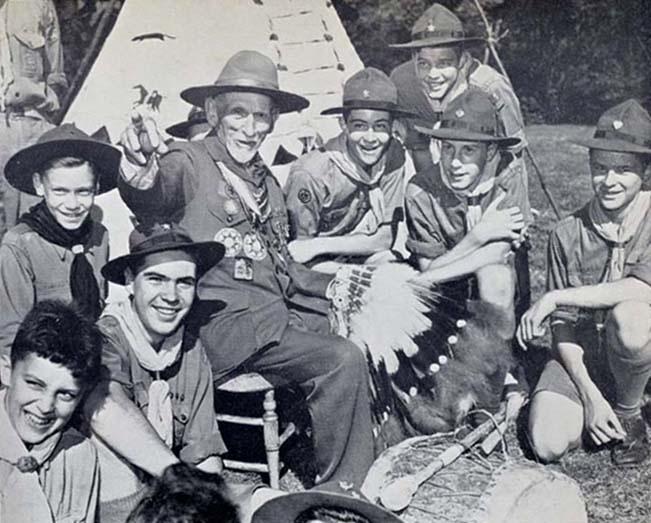
Daniel Beard in 1937, with Boy Scouts

Prior to the establishment of the Distinguished Eagle Scout Award, Dan Beard was recipient of the only "gold Eagle badge" awarded at the Second National Training Conference of Scout Executives held in 1922 in Blue Ridge, North Carolina.

Dan Beard was also involved with the Culver Academies' summer camp program for many years, which used his "Sons of Daniel Boone" program. This program still exists as the Academy's Culver Woodcraft Camp. In 1911, Beard visited Adirondack Camp for Boys, founded by Dr. Elias G. Brown, on Lake George in New York.

Beard died on June 11, 1941, aged 90, at his home Brooklands in Suffern, New York. He was buried near his home at the Brick Church Cemetery in Spring Valley, New York. The National Program Director of the Boy Scouts of America, E. Urner Goodman, was selected to be in charge of the beloved youth leader's funeral in Suffern. An estimated 2,000 people lined the funeral route to the cemetery in Monsey, New York, where 127 Boy Scouts formed an honor guard and assisted with traffic control.

== Honors and legacy ==
The Daniel Carter Beard Bridge carries I-471 across the Ohio River. A life-size bronze statue of Daniel Carter Beard and a Boy Scout, created by world-renowned sculptor Kenneth Bradford, stands at 322 East 3rd Street in Covington, Kentucky, Beard's boyhood home. The nearby Daniel Carter Beard Boyhood Home is now a National Historic Landmark in the Riverside Drive Historic District.

Junior High School 189 Daniel Carter Beard is located in Flushing, Queens, New York; the Daniel Carter Beard Mall is a nearby park. The Daniel Carter Beard Elementary School is located in Chicago, Illinois.

The Dan Beard Council is the administrative body of the BSA in the Greater Cincinnati area.

Many Scout camps have sites named after Beard:

- staffed-camp Dan Beard at Philmont Scout Ranch, Cimmaron, New Mexico
- Camp Dan Beard Forestburg Scout Reservation in Forestburg, New York
- campsite Dan Beard Broad Creek Memorial Scout Reservation, Maryland and Tama Hills, Tokyo, Japan
- campsite Dan Beard at Baiting Hollow Scout Camp, Baiting Hollow, New York
- campsite Dan Beard at Horseshoe Scout Reservation, Rising Sun, Maryland
- campsite Dan Beard at Camp Raven Knob Raven Knob Scout Reservation, Mt. Airy, North Carolina

Other camps have programs named after Beard, such as the first-year camper program at McKee Scout Reservation in Kentucky.

The Forest Preserves of Cook County, Illinois, has long had a campground called Camp Dan Beard.

Freemasons in the U.S. offer the Daniel Carter Beard Masonic Scouter Award for Masons who are involved with Scouting. The BSA offers the James E. West Fellowship Award; an advanced level is the 1910 Society which in turn includes levels of contributions—the Daniel Carter Beard is recognized for a gift of at least $100,000.

Mount Dan Beard, a 10,082-foot (3,073 m) peak in the Alaska Range near Denali in Denali National Park and Preserve, is named after Beard.

Every year on February 8, in commemoration of Founders Day, local Scouts place a wreath on Beard's grave at the Brick Church Cemetery.

== Works ==
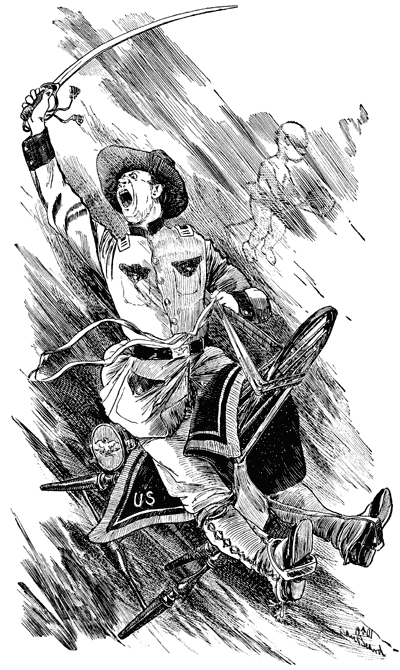
Captain Jinks, Hero, from the 1902 book of the same name by Ernest Crosby, illustrated by Beard

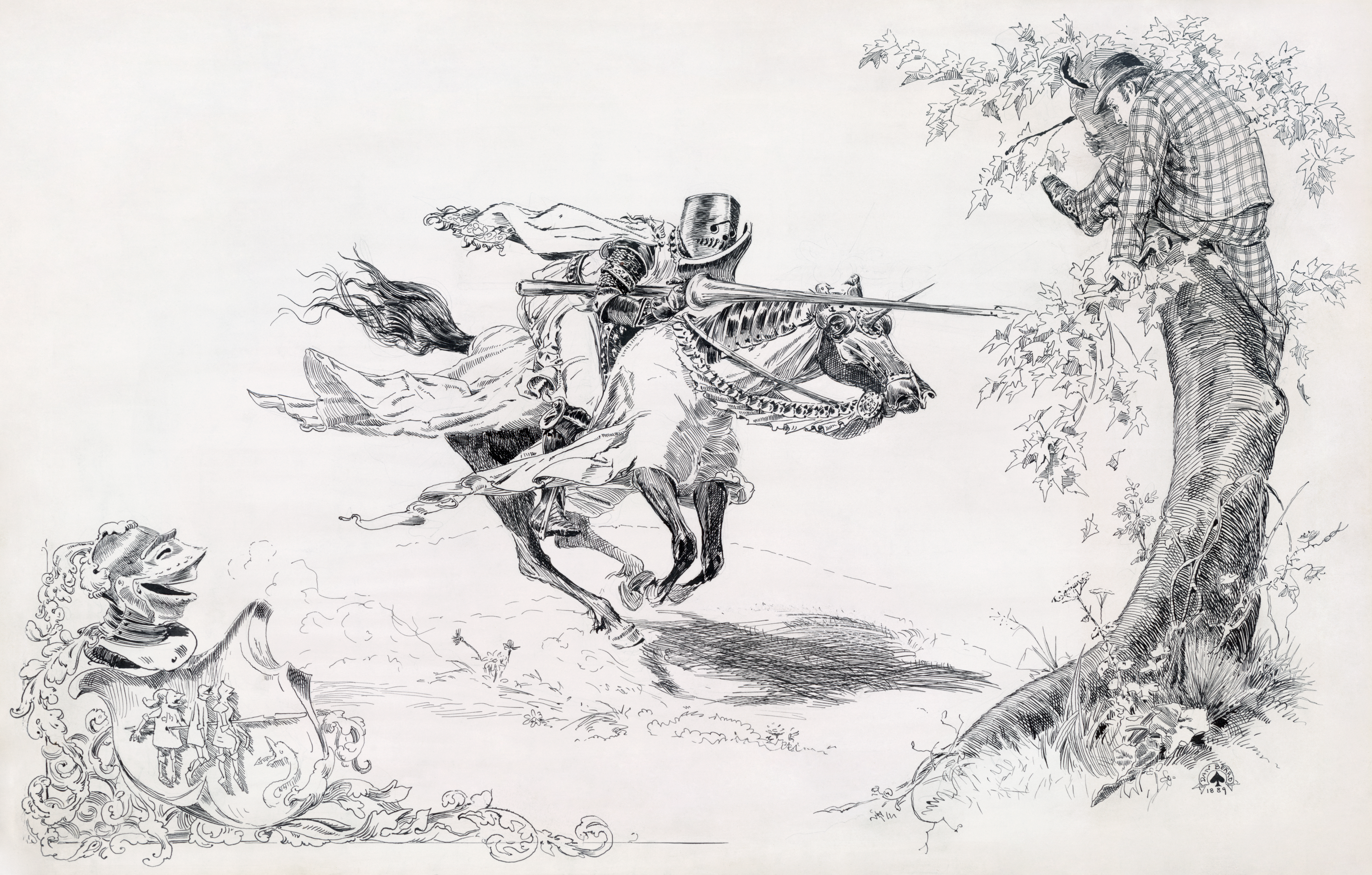
Beard's frontispiece for Twain's A Connecticut Yankee in King Arthur's Court.

- The American Boy's Handy Book. 1882.
- Beard, Daniel Carter (1892). Moonblight and Six Feet of Romance.
- The Outdoor Handy Book. 1896.
- The Jack of All Trades: New Ideas for American Boys. 1900.
- The Field and Forest Handy Book: New Ideas for Out of Doors. 1906.
- Handicraft for Outdoor Boys. 1906.
- Animal Book and Campfire Stories. 1907.
- The Boy Pioneers: Sons of Daniel Boone. 1909.
- Boat Building, and Boating. 1912.
- Shelters, shacks, and shanties. C. Scribner's Sons. 1920. still in print
- The American Boy's Book of Bugs, Butterflies and Beetles. 1915.
- The American Boy's Book of Signs, Signals and Symbols. 1918.
- The American Boy's Book of Camp-Lore and Woodcraft. 1920.
- The American Boy's Book of Wild Animals. 1921.
- The Black Wolf-Pack. 1922.
- American Boy's Book of Birds and Brownies of the Woods. 1923.
- Do It Yourself. 1925.
- Wisdom of the Woods. 1926.
- Buckskin Book For Buckskin Men and Boys. 1929.
- Hardly A Man is Now Alive. 1939.
- A Connecticut Yankee in King Arthur's Court by Mark Twain, (1889), illustrator
- Beard, Daniel Carter (1890). The American Boy's Book of Sport.
- The American Claimant by Mark Twain, (1892), illustrator
- Following the Equator. 1897. contributing illustrator

== See also ==
- Scouting memorials
- Anderson, Axel Blair, "Daniel Carter Beard: Outdoorsman, Friend of Youth and Co-founder, Boy Scouts of America", second edition, 2026
