= Mount Dan Beard =

Mountain in Alaska, United States

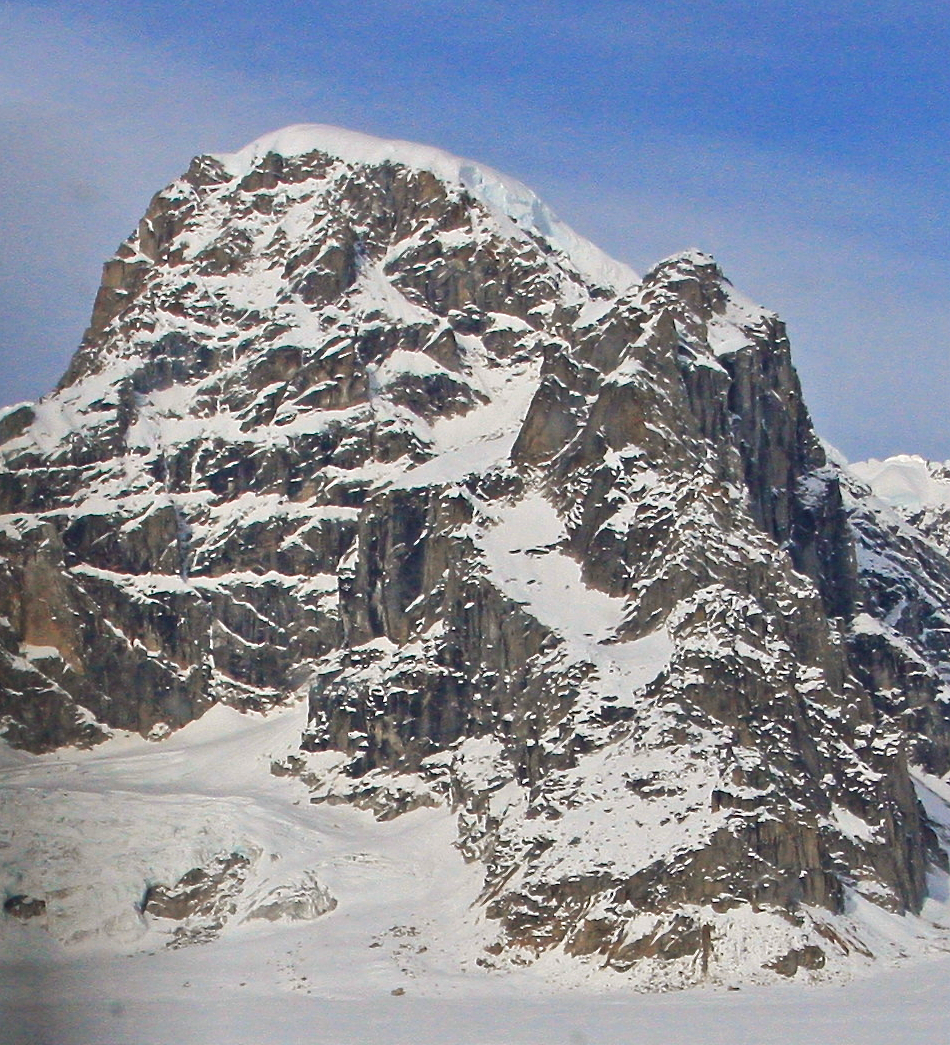

Highest point
- Elevation: 10,082 ft (3,073 m)
- Prominence: 1,710 ft (520 m)
- Coordinates: 63°01′13″N 150°47′13″W

Geography
- Location within Alaska
- Location: Matanuska-Susitna Borough, Alaska, United States
- Parent range: Alaska Range
- Topo map: USGS Mount McKinley A-2

Climbing
- Easiest route: Southeast ridge

Mount Dan Beard is a 10,082-foot (3,073 m) mountain in the Alaska Range, in Denali National Park and Preserve. Mount Dan Beard lies to the southeast of Denali, overlooking the Don Sheldon Amphitheater of Ruth Glacier. The mountain was named in 1910 by Herschel Clifford Parker and Belmore Browne for illustrator Daniel Carter Beard, who founded the scouting organization Sons of Daniel Boone.

== Gallery ==
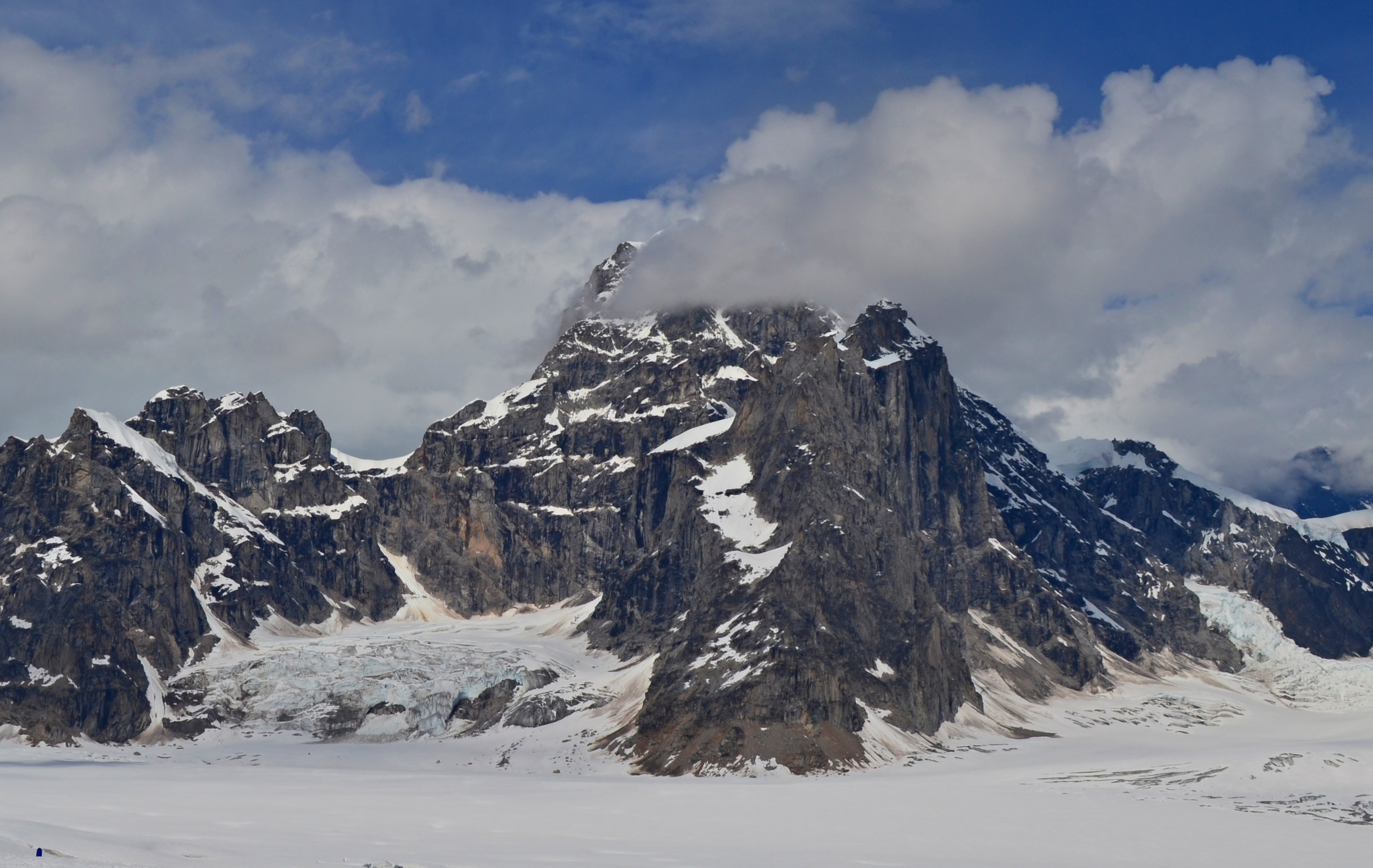
Mount Dan Beard from Ruth Glacier

== See also ==
- Mountain peaks of Alaska
