= The Rooster Comb =

Mountain in Alaska, United States

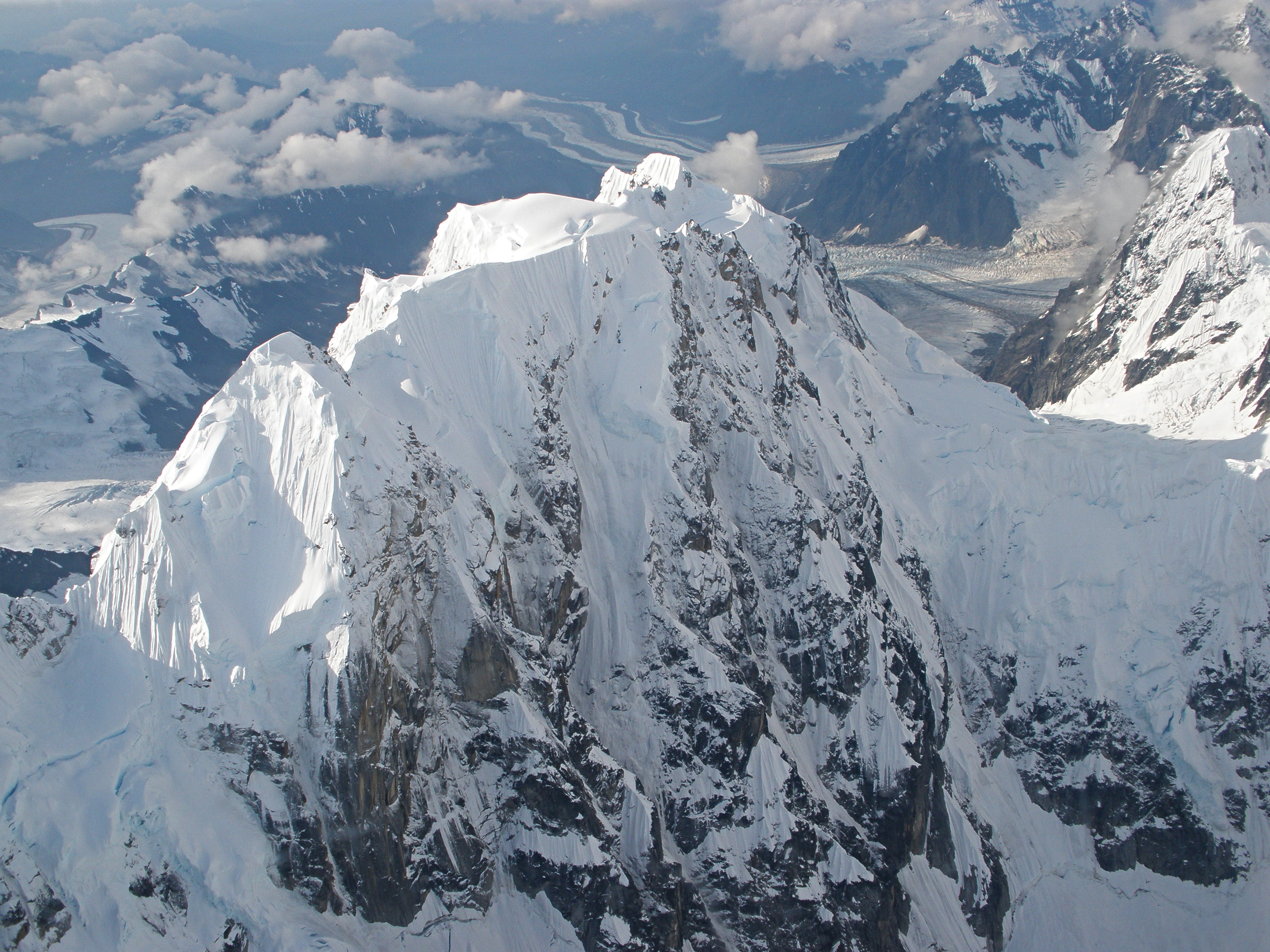
- The Rooster Comb

Highest point
- Elevation: 10,180 ft (3,100 m)
- Prominence: 1,480 ft (450 m)
- Parent peak: Mount Huntington
- Coordinates: 62°58′22″N 150°50′15″W

Geography
- Location within Alaska
- Interactive map of The Rooster Comb
- Country: United States
- State: Alaska
- Borough: Matanuska-Susitna
- Protected area: Denali National Park
- Parent range: Alaska Range
- Topo map: USGS Talkeetna D-2

Geology
- Rock type: Granite

Climbing
- Easiest route: rock/snow/ice climb

The Rooster Comb is a 10,180 ft (3,100 m) multi-peak mountain located in the Alaska Range, in Denali National Park and Preserve, in the U.S. state of Alaska. It is situated 4,000 feet above the Ruth Glacier along the southwest margin of the Don Sheldon Amphitheater, 8.53 mi (14 km) southeast of Denali, 2 mi (3 km) east of Mount Huntington, and 2.4 mi (4 km) southeast of Mount Kudlich. The mountain's descriptive name was submitted by Bradford Washburn in 1957 based on an original description by Claude Ewing Rusk during his 1910 Mazama Expedition: "To our west was a remarkable mountain, rising abruptly from the snowfields to a height of at least 10,000 feet, its tip a succession of corniced spires, like a great rooster comb."

== Climate ==
Based on the Köppen climate classification, this mountain is located in a subarctic climate zone with long, cold, snowy winters, and mild summers. Winter temperatures can drop below −20 °F with wind chill factors below −30 °F. The months May through June offer the most favorable weather for climbing or viewing.

== Gallery ==
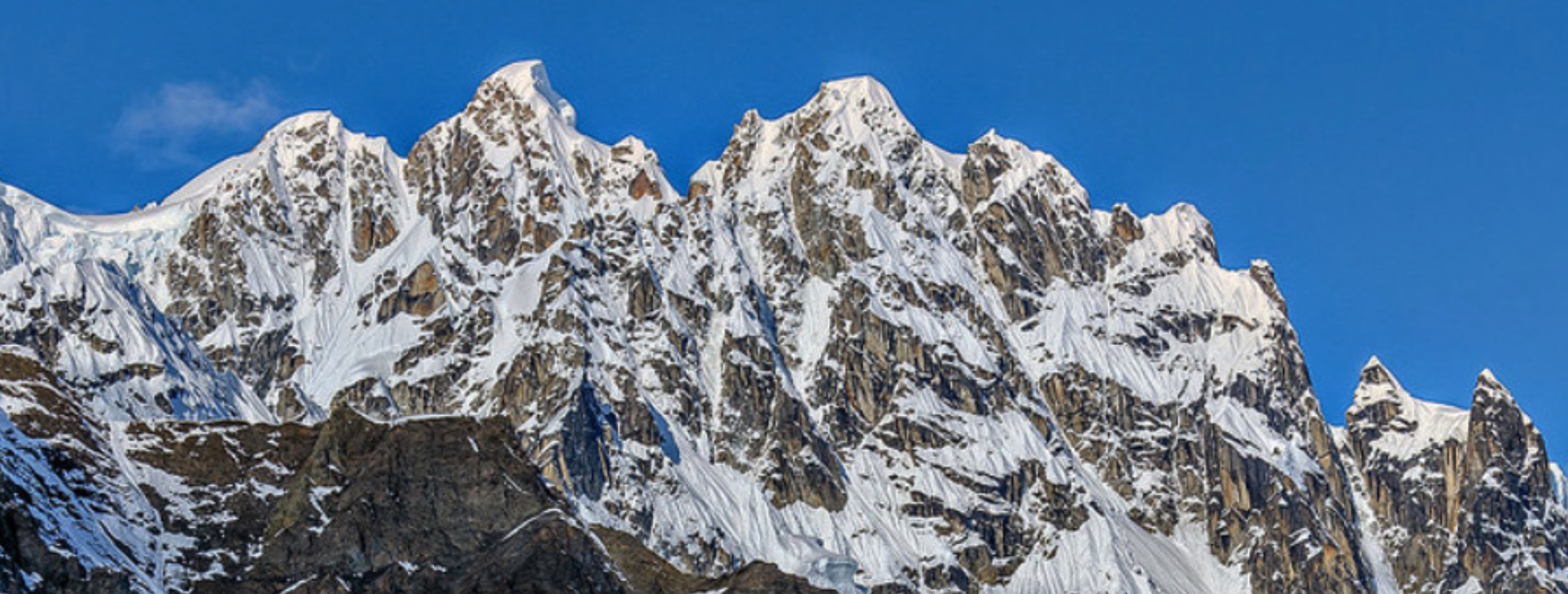
The Rooster Comb

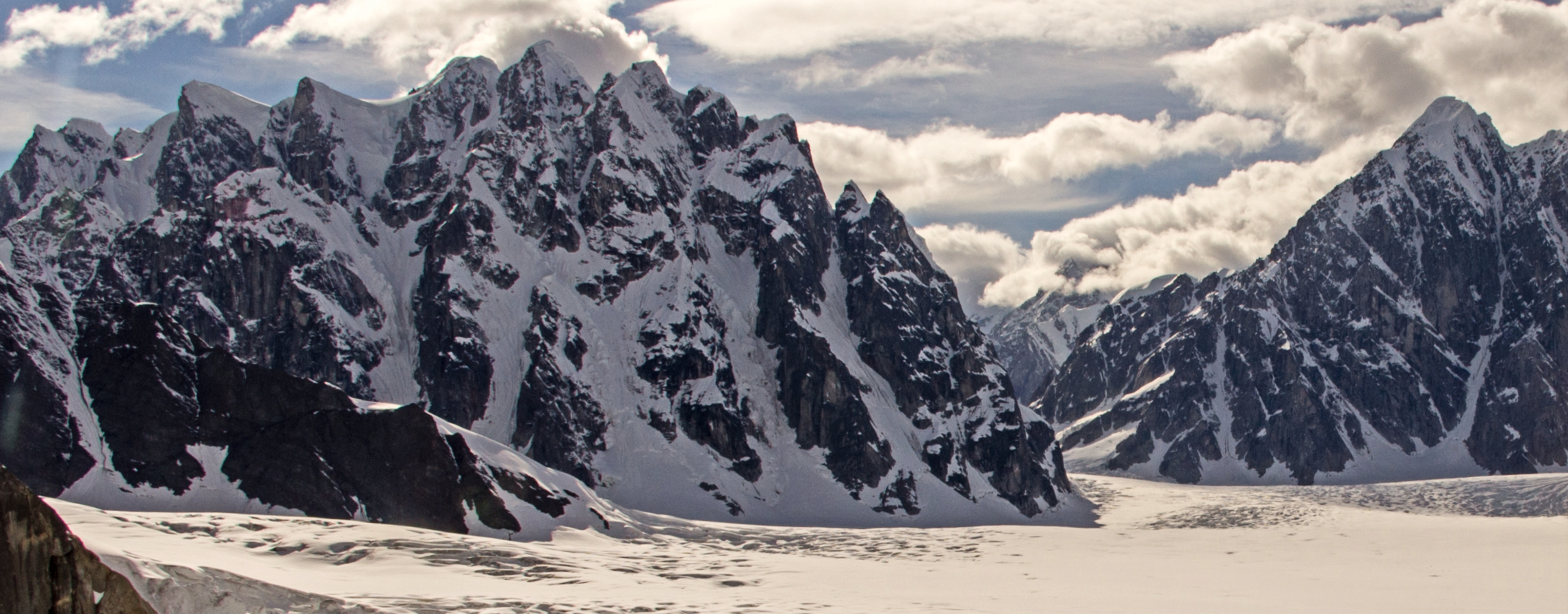
The Rooster Comb (left) and Mount Kudlich to right

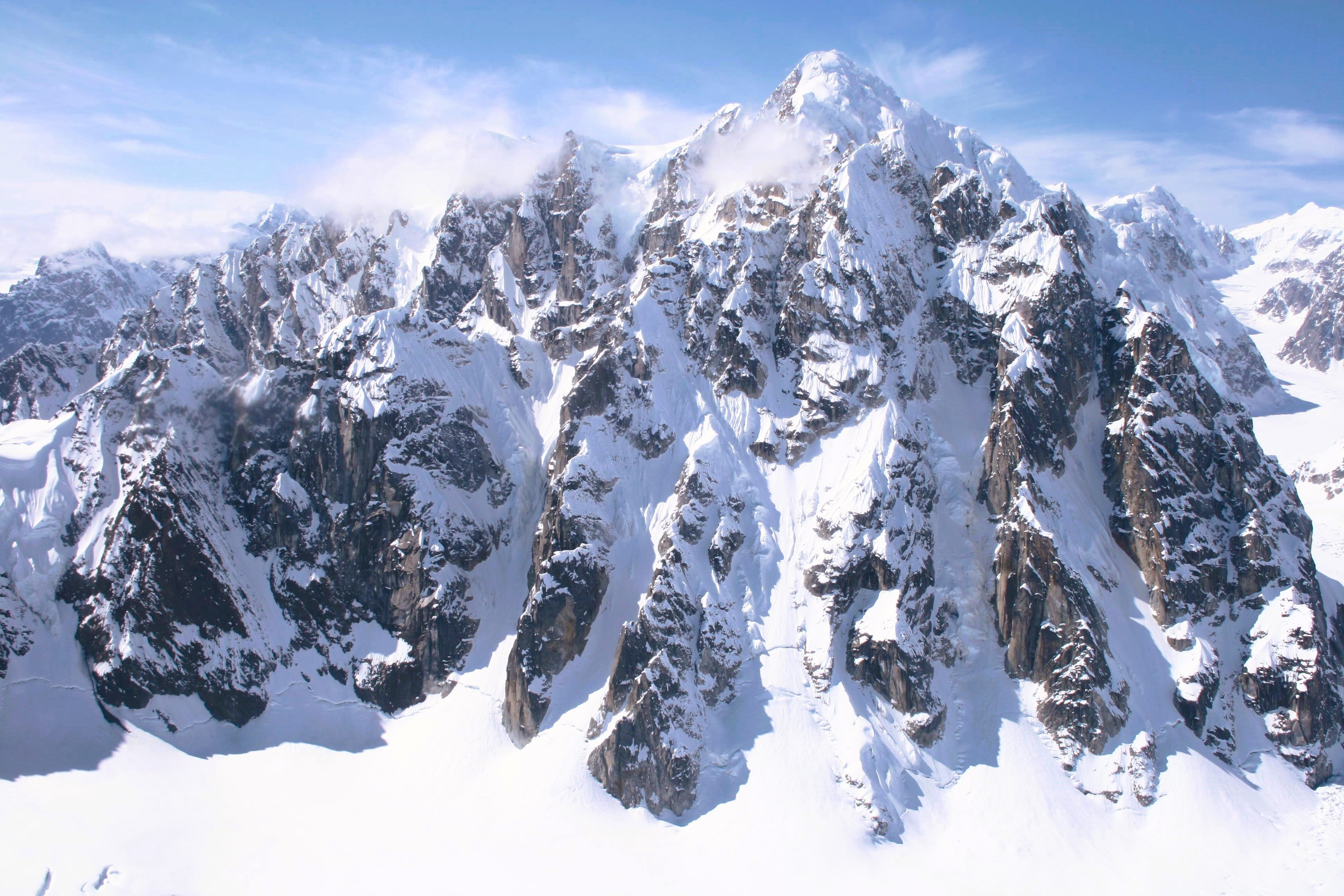
East aspect, with the top of Mt. Huntington visible in back

== See also ==
- Mountain peaks of Alaska
- Geography of Alaska
