= George Oliver Shields =

American conservationist and editor

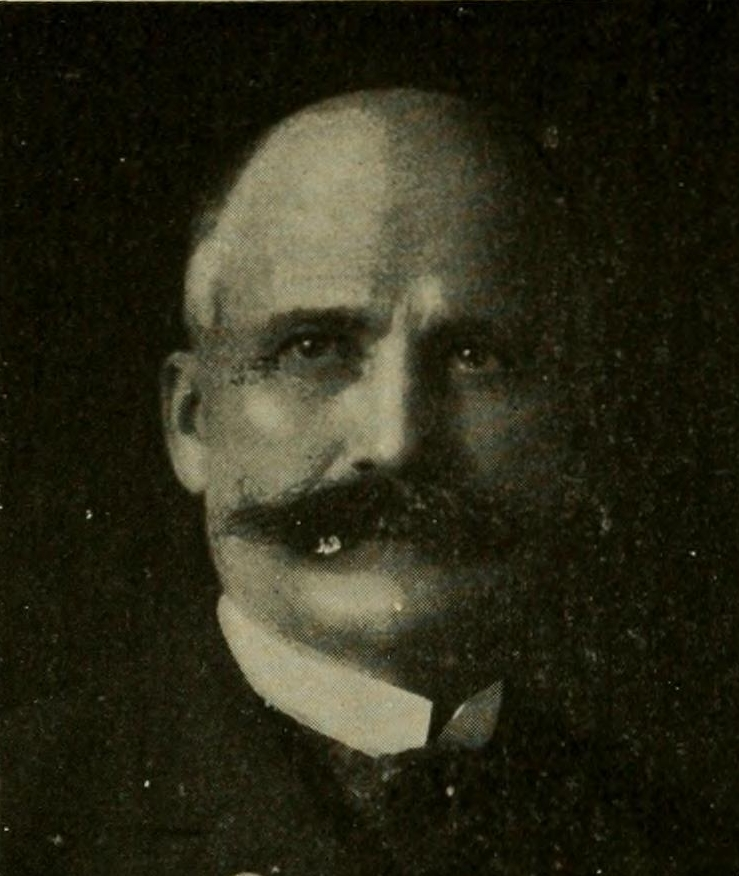
- Born: August 26, 1846
- Died: November 11, 1925 (aged 79)
- Resting place: Fresh Pond Crematory and Columbarium
- Occupation: Conservationist, editor, writer, environmentalist

Signature
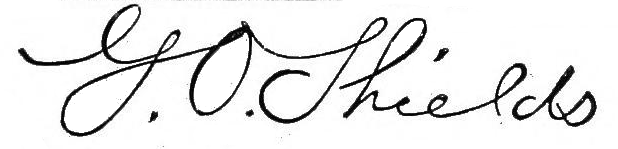

George Oliver Shields (August 26, 1846 – November 11, 1925) who also wrote under the pseudonym Coquina was the editor of a pioneering American magazine for outdoors sports Recreation where he also took on a role as an activist for the conservation of wildlife. In a column in the magazine, he began to shame fish and game sportsmen who he deemed as not following sporting ethics. This eventually led to clashes with powerful people, resulting in his dismissal from the editorial position.

== Life and work ==
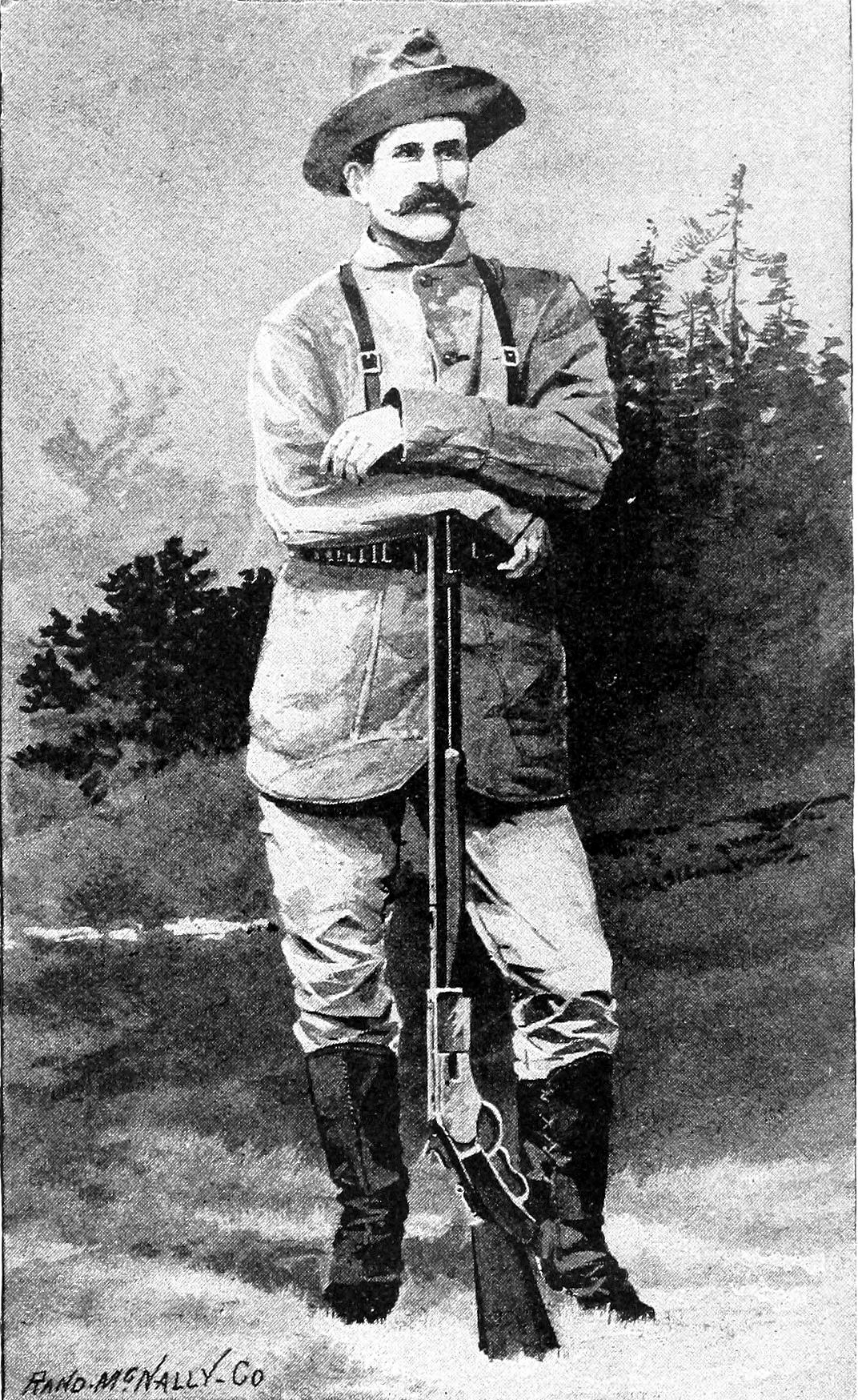

Shields was born in Batavia, Ohio to Eliza J. née Dawson and John F. Shields. Educated at public school in Delaware County he joined the Union Army in 1864. Wounded at Resaca, Georgia in 1864 he was discharged in July 1865. He then worked as an immigration agent, trying to get stock investors to support the Pecos Irrigation and Improvement Company at Carlsbad, New Mexico (then called Eddy). It was during this period that he spent time shooting game and writing about it. He took on the pseudonym Coquina from the sedimentary rock found in Florida. He founded the outdoors sporting magazine Recreation in 1894 and took on the cause of wildlife conservation along with William T. Hornaday by heading the Camp Fire Club of America from 1897 to 1903. They also started a League of American Sportsmen which set up a system of game wardens. Recreation magazine reached out to the growing middle-class in America and helped grow the "New Nationalism" associated with Theodore Roosevelt. He named and shamed various people as "Game Hogs" and "Fish Hogs" in the pages of Recreation. Shields ran images of hunters that he called as "game-hogs" with libelous captions such as "I pity the dogs that were forced to associate with such miserable swine as these." In 1905, a reaction to shaming powerful people led to his magazine being starved of advertisements from arms companies. He was forced into bankruptcy and removed from editorship, being replaced by Daniel Carter Beard. Recreation magazine was merged into Illustrated outdoor world. The New York Zoological Society under Hornaday helped establish Shield's Magazine which ran for a few years. Shields then took to touring and lecturing, influencing the passing of game laws and the Lacey Act.

Shields sometimes went by the "honorary" title of Colonel G.O. Shields and tended to clash with many people with his ideas. He separated from his wife in 1892 with no children and died at St. Luke's Hospital, New York.

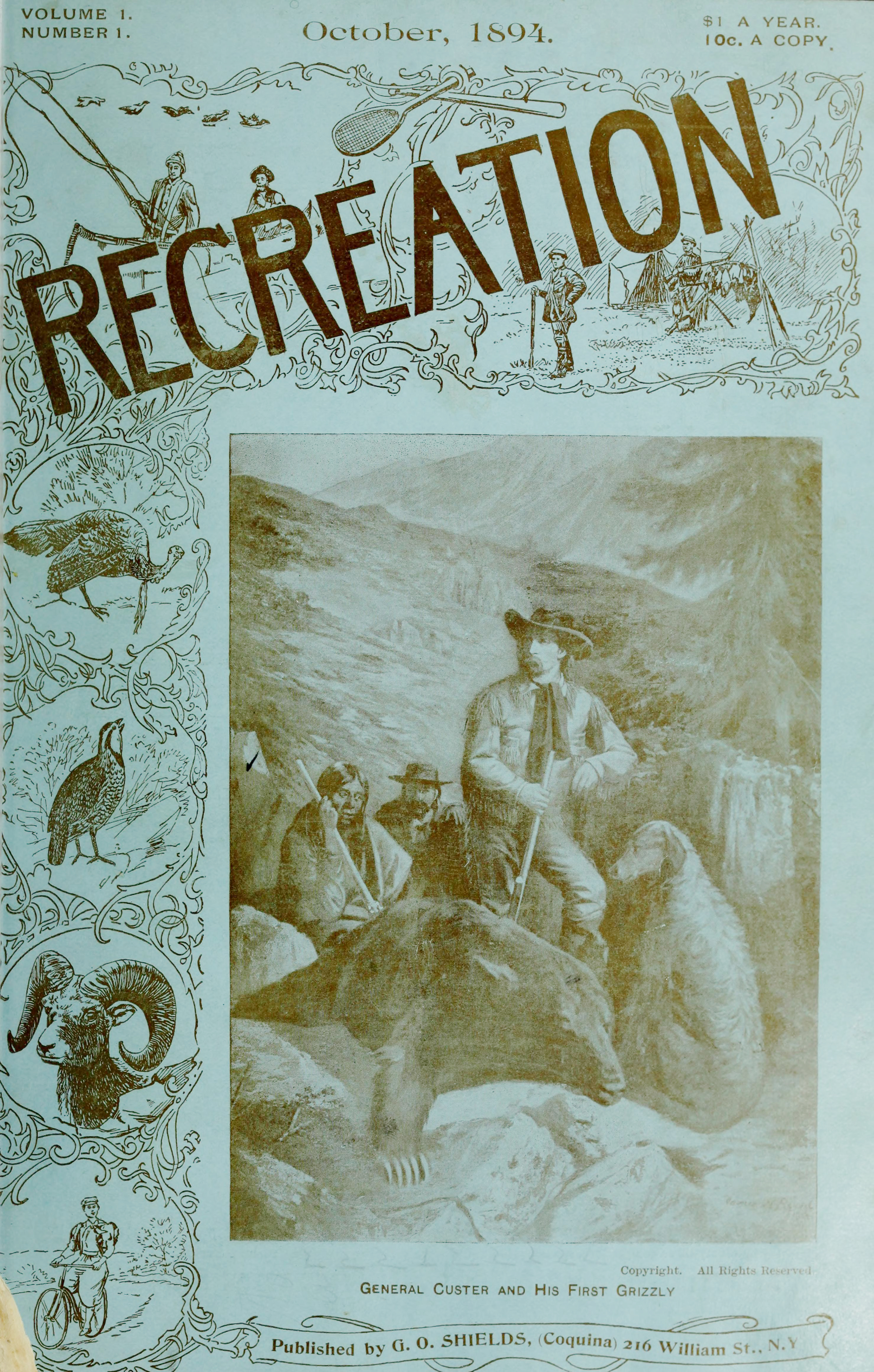
Cover of Recreation (1893)

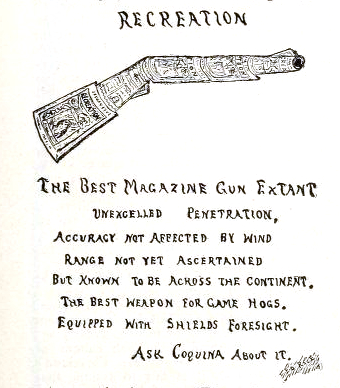
Action against "Game Hogs" and "Fish Hogs"

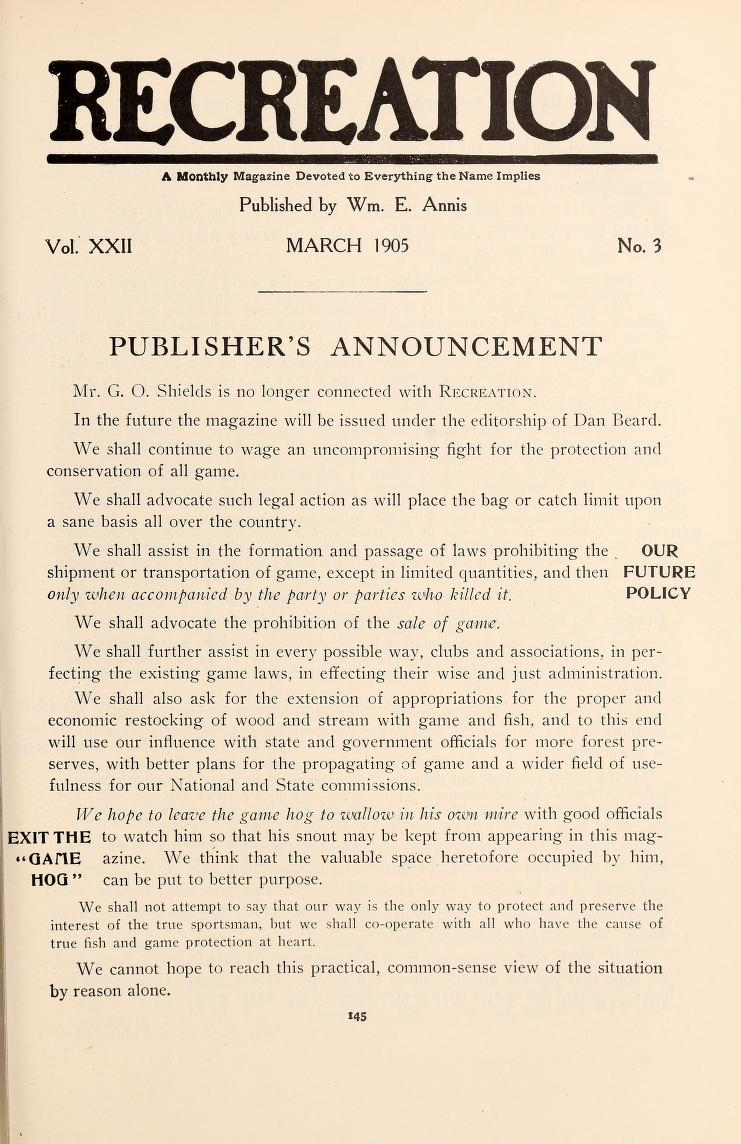
Note on the removal of Shields
