= Camp Fire Club =

American outdoors group

Camp Fire Club of America
- Formation: 1897; 129 years ago
- Purpose: Wildlife conservation and member recreation.
- Location: Chappaqua, New York, United States
- Coordinates: 41.167858814749835°N 73.80996945767103°W
- Website: www.campfirefund.org

The Camp-Fire Club of America was organized in 1897 to bring together hunters, anglers, explorers, naturalists, artists and individuals who subscribe to the principles of adventure and fellowship in the great outdoors, and to further the interests of sports afield and wildlife conservation. The organization's primary focus is upon conservation and the practice and continuation of outdoor skills, as well as providing recreational opportunities for its members.

The organization also functions as a conservation and environmental group, with a focus upon the preservation of the natural environment, habitat, forests and wildlife conservation through the Camp Fire Conservation Fund. Camp-Fire Club was instrumental in many of the biggest environmental efforts of the 19th and 20th centuries including: launching the American Bison Society and saving the American bison in 1905, passing the Fur Seal Preservation Act in 1909, the founding of Glacier National Park in 1910, the passing of the Plumage Bill in 1910, the passing of the Migratory Bird Treaty Act in 1918, creating the U.S. National Park System's Operating Standards in 1923, passing the Federal Duck Stamp Act in 1929, and helping to protect Florida's Key Deer population in the early 1950s. Camp-Fire was also instrumental in getting New York State to outlaw the indiscriminate use of DDT and other pesticides in the 1960s in New York State. Camp-Fire Club continues to support conservation through a variety of efforts nationwide and globally.

Notable Camp-Fire Club members include:

- David Abercrombie
- Carl Akeley
- A.A. Anderson
- Daniel Carter Beard
- Clarence Birdseye
- James L. Clark
- 'Buffalo Bill' Cody
- Ezra Fitch
- Zane Grey
- Charles "Buffalo" Jones
- Gifford Pinchot
- George Dupont Pratt
- Laurance Rockefeller
- Theodore Roosevelt
- Carl Rungius
- Ernest Thompson Seton
- George Shields
- Eric Trump

The club has had strong membership connections and close ties with many organizations over its history including the American Museum of Natural History, the Boy Scouts of America, the Bronx Zoo, The Adirondack League Club, and the Explorers Club.
