= The American Boy's Handy Book =

1890 handbook of activities intended for boys

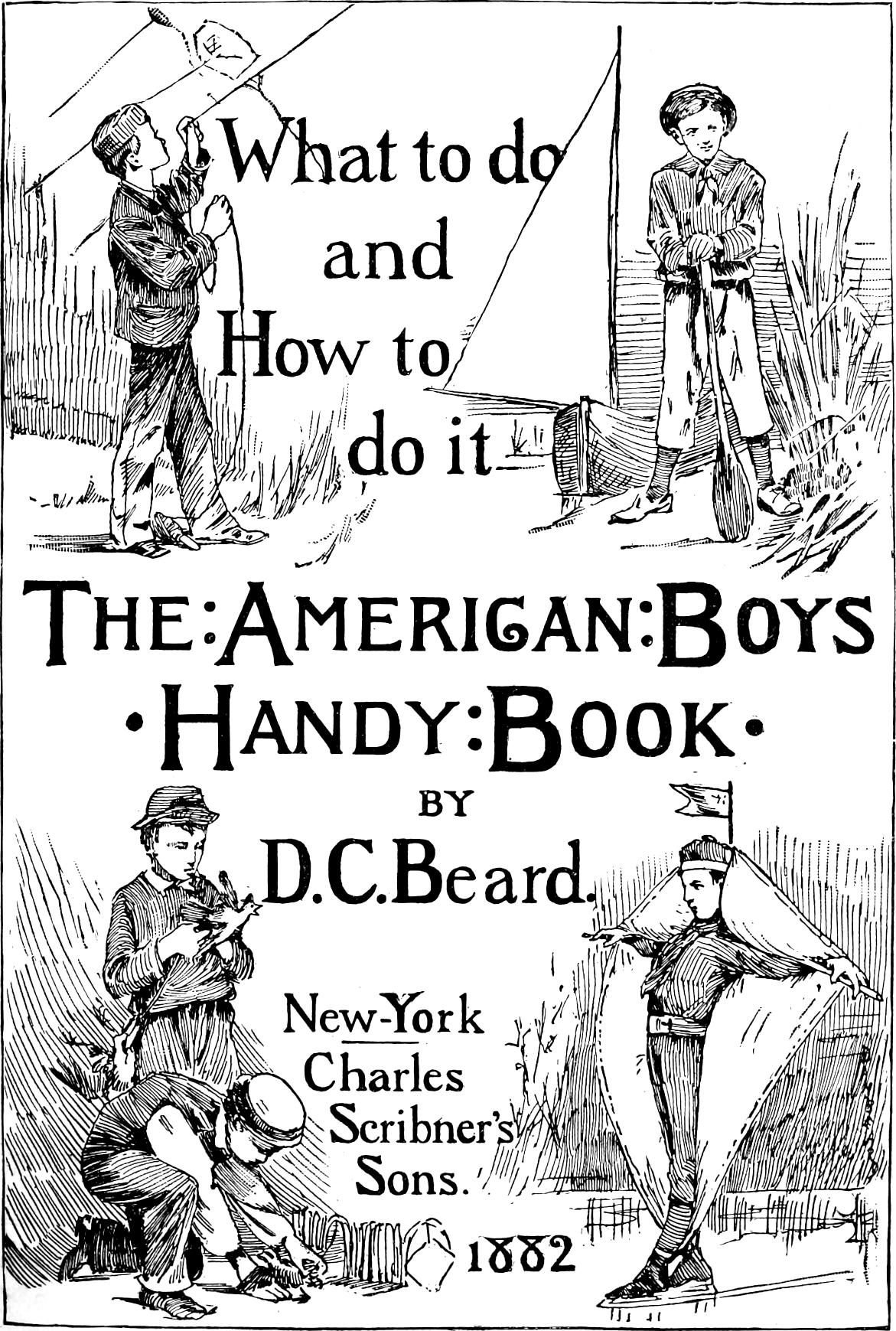
- Original title page
- Author: Daniel Carter Beard
- Illustrator: Daniel Carter Beard
- Language: English
- Publisher: Scribner; David R. Godine, Publisher
- Publication date: 1882
- Publication place: United States

The American Boy's Handy Book is a handbook of activities intended for boys, written by Daniel Carter Beard, later a founder of the Boy Scouts of America. It is divided into seasonal sections, with activities appropriate for each season in their respective sections. Originally published in New York City in 1882 with 254 black-and-white figures and 63 illustrations. The 2010 Centennial Edition of the book was granted the Gelett Burgess Children's Book Award in the Sports and Hobbies category.

== Background ==
This book for American boys in the late 19th century is filled with black & white illustrations and schematics. It gives instruction and advice on subjects ranging from kites, fishing, knots, telescopes, tents, soap bubbles, snowball warfare, puppets, kaleidoscopes, whirligigs, costumes, decoys and fireworks. There are many topics related to animals and wildlife—even including taxidermy and trapping. The projects range in complexity. From the very simple (like paper crafts), to the quite involved—such as boat construction.

== See also ==
- Boy Scout Handbook
