= Sons of Daniel Boone =

- Founded: 1905
- Defunct: 1910; merged with the Boy Scouts of America
- Founder: Daniel Carter Beard

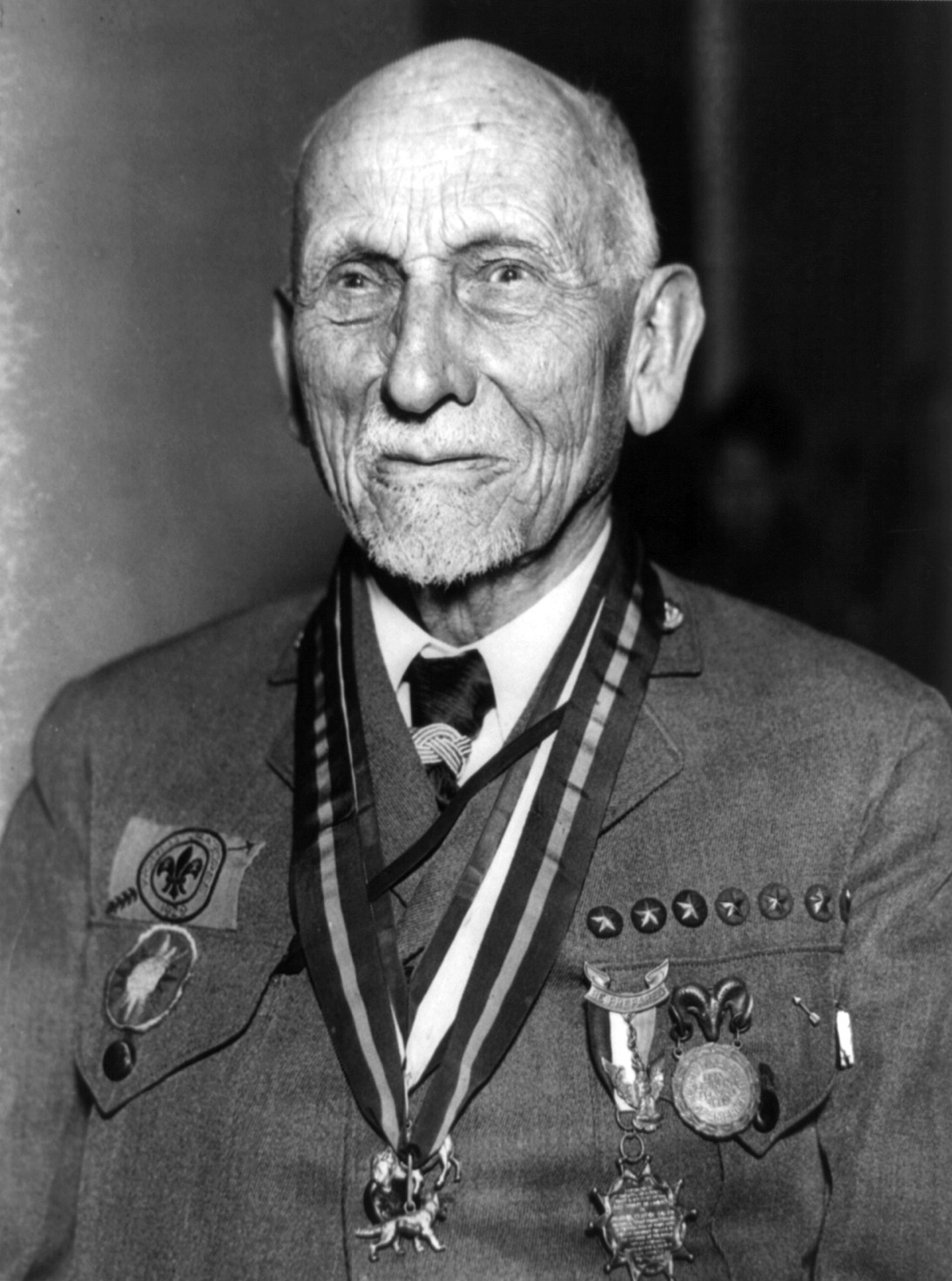
Daniel Beard, founder of the Sons of Daniel Boone.

The Sons of Daniel Boone (sometimes called the Society of the Sons of Daniel Boone), later the Boy Pioneers of America, was a youth program developed by Daniel Carter Beard in 1905 based on the American frontiersman. When Dan Beard joined the Boy Scouts of America (BSA) in 1910 as one of their national Scout commissioners, he merged his group into the fledgling BSA.

== Background ==
Boys were organized into groups called forts. The officers of the fort took on names of frontiersmen and had specific insignia:

| Frontiersman | Position | Emblem |
|---|---|---|
| Daniel Boone | President | Powder-horn |
| David Crockett | Vice-president | Coonskin cap |
| Kit Carson | Treasurer | Flint arrowhead |
| Simon Kenton | Keeper of the gun | Tomahawk |
| John James Audubon | Librarian | Bird |
| Johnny Appleseed | Forester | Tree |
| George Catlin | Totem painter | Buffalo head |

The uniform of the boys was based on the fringed buckskin outfit of the frontiersman. There were no ranks or advancement, but boys could earn notches and top notches for achievements in different areas.

Beard first promoted the program in his column in Recreation Magazine starting in March 1905. He then moved over to Woman's Home Companion (WHC) in April 1906. When he left that magazine in 1909 and moved to Pictorial Review, he was forced to rename the program Boy Pioneers of America because WHC felt they owned the name.

A handbook for the program wasn't published until 1909, as Boy Pioneers: Sons of Daniel Boone.

In 2006 Great Rivers Council in Missouri established a summer camp honor society at Hohn Scout Reservation and Camp Thunderbird named Sons of Daniel Boone, following some of the original writings of Daniel Carter Beard. Since its inception over 600 Scouts have become honor members.
