= Mount Huntington (Alaska) =

Mountain in Alaska, United States

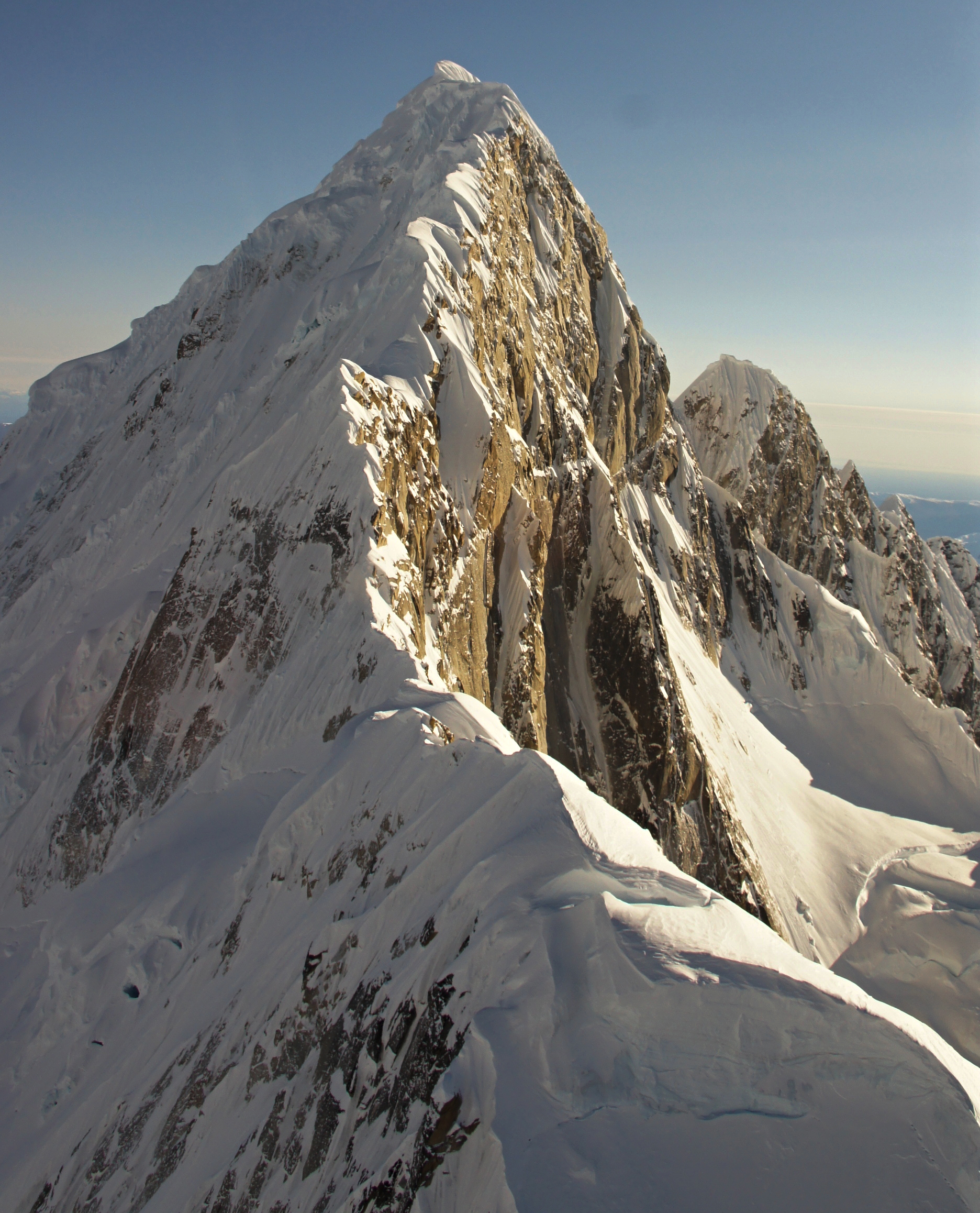

Highest point
- Elevation: 12,241 ft (3,731 m)
- Prominence: 2,890 ft (880 m)
- Coordinates: 62°58′02″N 150°53′55″W

Geography
- Location within Alaska
- Interactive map of Mount Huntington
- Country: United States
- State: Alaska
- Borough: Matanuska-Susitna
- Protected area: Denali National Park and Preserve
- Parent range: Central Alaska Range
- Topo map: USGS Talkeetna D-2

Climbing
- First ascent: 25 May 1964 by Jacques Batkin and Sylvain Sarthou
- Easiest route: rock/snow/ice climb

Mount Huntington is a striking rock and ice pyramid in the central Alaska Range, about eight miles (13 km) south-southeast of Denali. It is also about six miles (9.7 km) east of Mount Hunter, and two miles west of The Rooster Comb. While overshadowed in absolute elevation by Denali, Huntington is a steeper peak: in almost every direction, faces drop over 5,000 feet (1,520 m) in about a mile (1.6 km). Even its easiest route presents significantly more technical challenge than the standard route on Denali, and it is a favorite peak for high-standard technical climbers.

Mount Huntington was first climbed in 1964 by a French expedition led by famed alpinist Lionel Terray, via the Northwest Ridge, from then on also called the French Ridge. The second ascent the following year, via the West Face/West Rib, is reported by David Roberts in The Mountain of My Fear. The mountain can be accessed either from the West Fork of the Ruth Glacier, on the north side of the mountain, or the Tokositna Glacier, on the south side.

== Notable ascents ==
- 1964 French Ridge Lionel Terray et al.
- 1965 Harvard Route (VI 5.9 A2 70-degree ice) by David Roberts, Ed Bernd, Don Jensen, Matt Hale.
- 1972 Third ascent on July 5 by a new route on the East Ridge. Frank Zahar, Rocky Keeler, Johnny Waterman, Niels Andersen and Roger Derryberry.
- 1978 North Face Jack Roberts and Simon McCartney, summit reached on July 6, 1978.
- 1978 Southeast Spur Joseph Kaelin, Kent Meneghin, Glenn Randall and Angus M. Thuermer Jr., summit reached on July 9, 1978.
- 1980 The British Route, East Face Roger Mear and Steve Bell, summit reached on May 16, 1980.
- 1981 Colton-Leach Route, West Face Nick Colton, Tim Leach.
- 1989 Nettle-Quirk Route disputed FA by Dave Nettle and James Quirk, summit reached May 24, 1989.
- 2017 Gauntlet Ridge, Clint Helander and Jess Roskelley, five days on route, two nights spent sleeping on summit.

== Popular culture ==
Characteristics of the mountain were the inspiration of the Paramount Pictures logo.

== Gallery ==
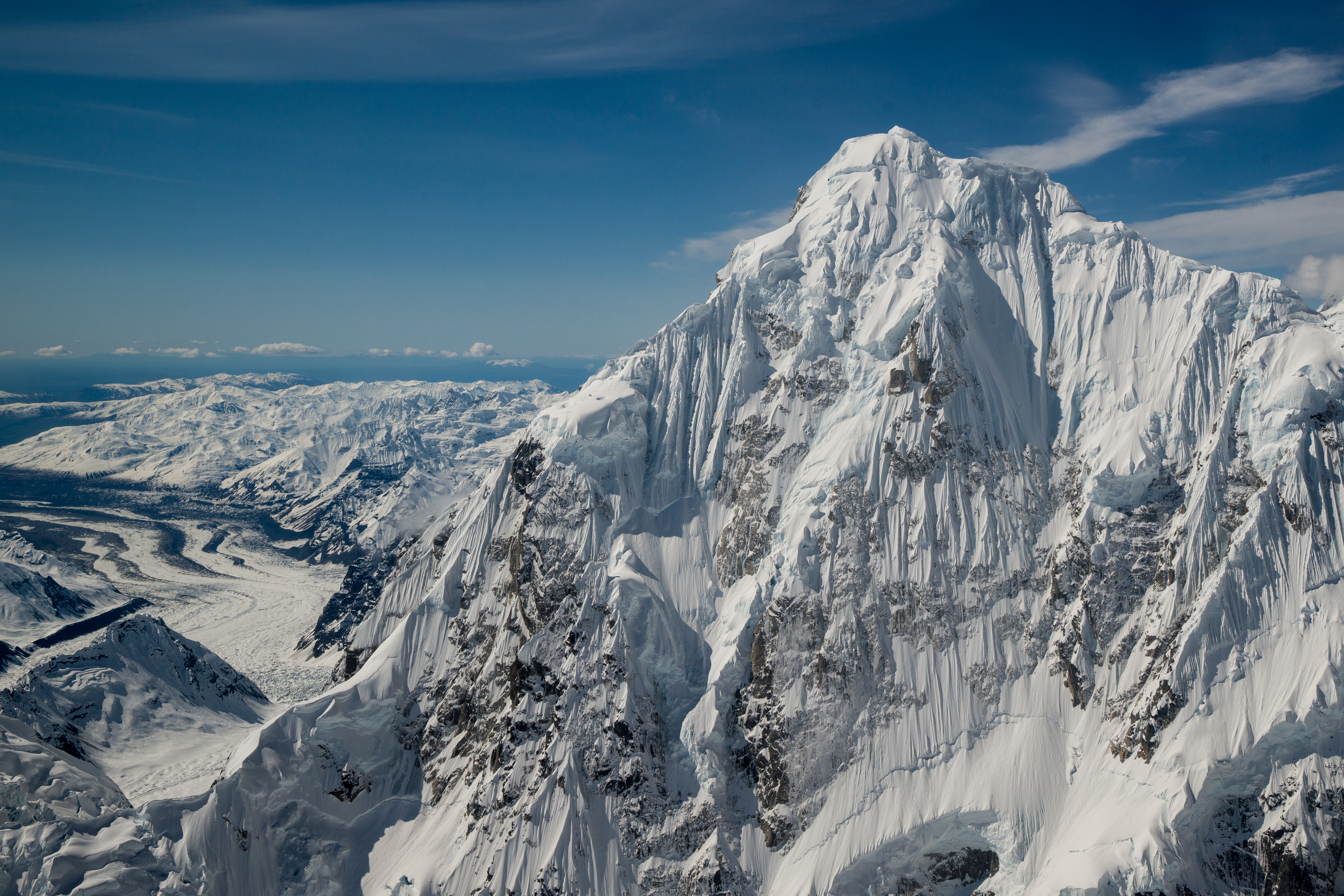

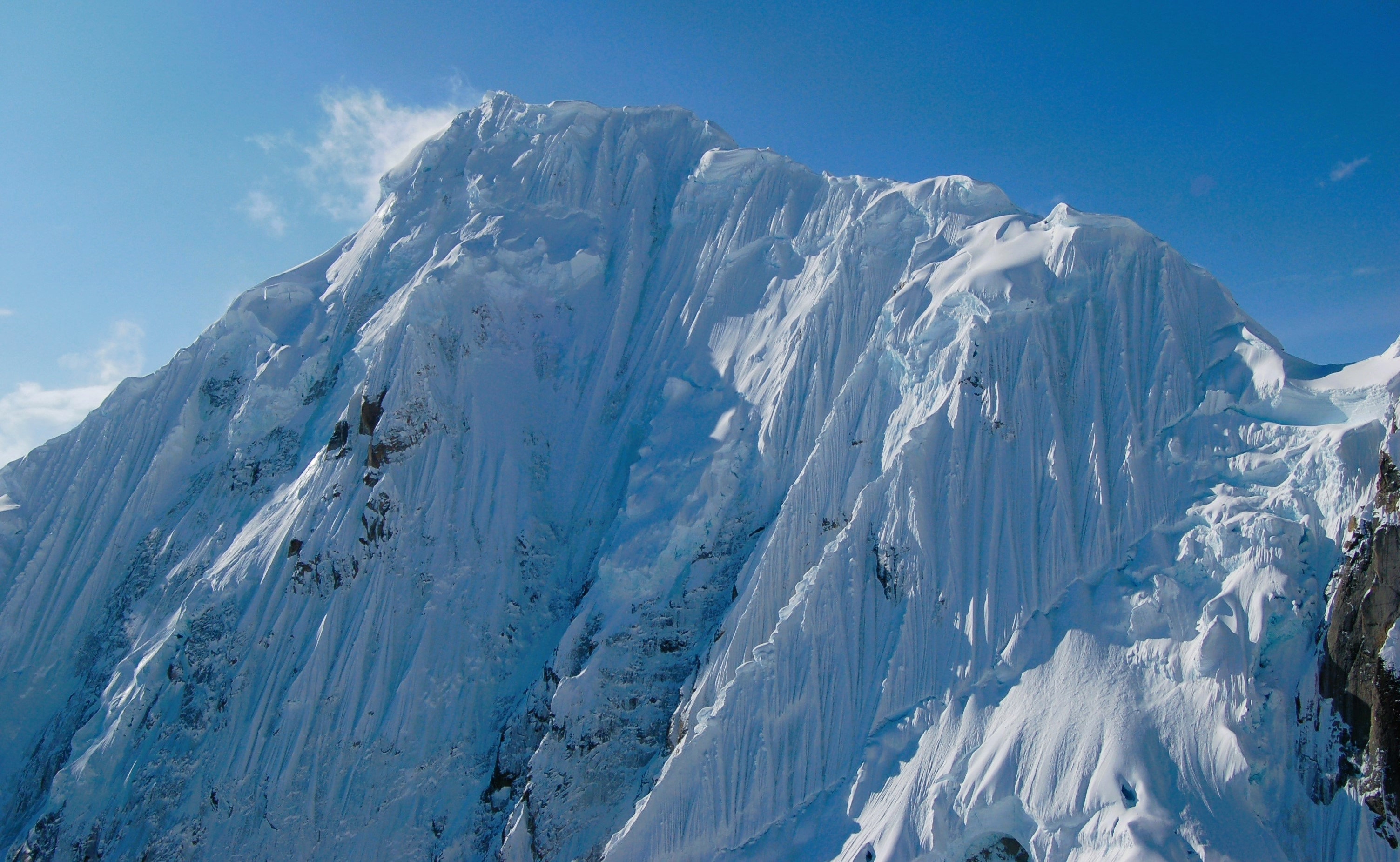
North face

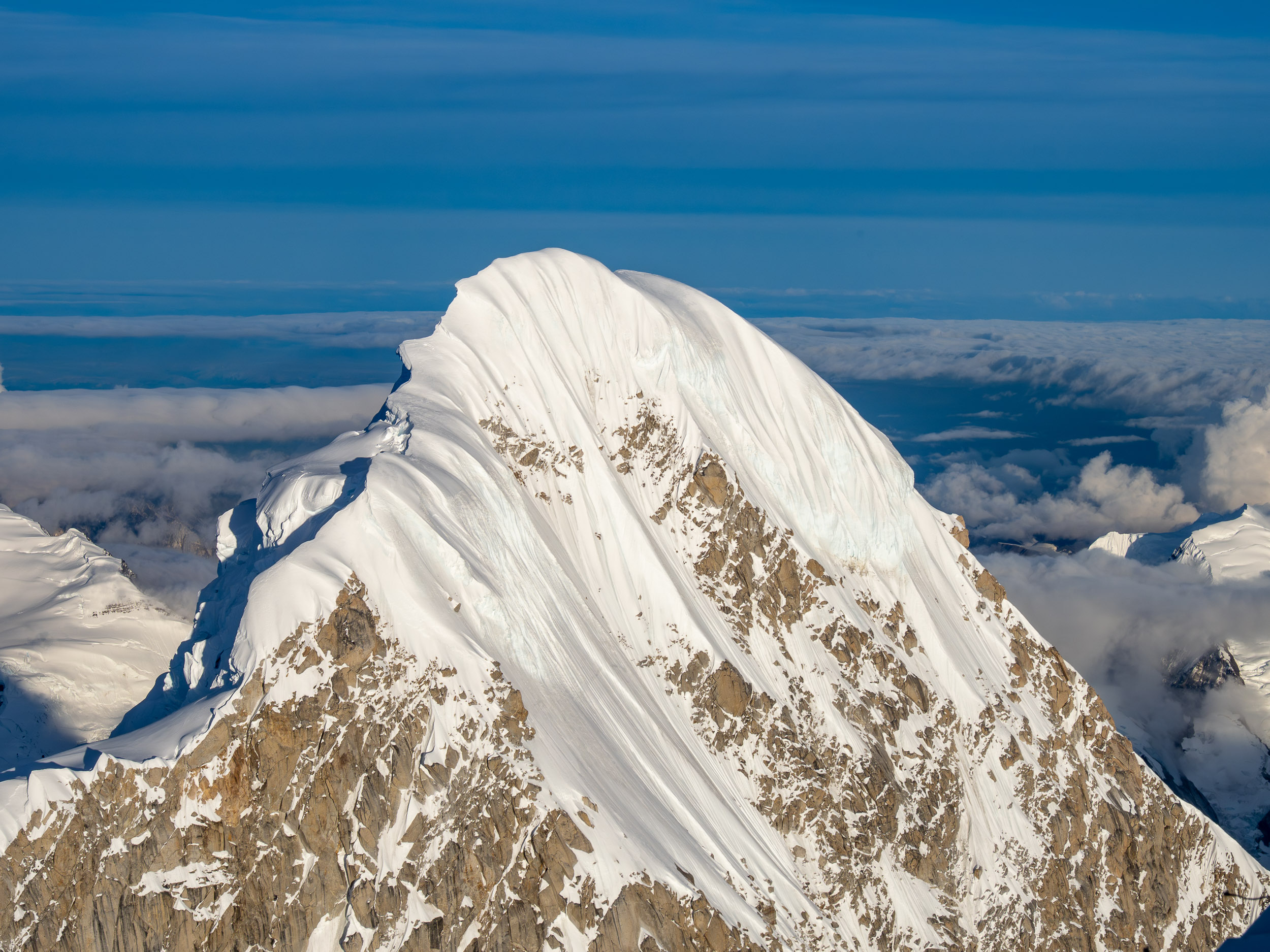
Aerial view of west aspect of summit

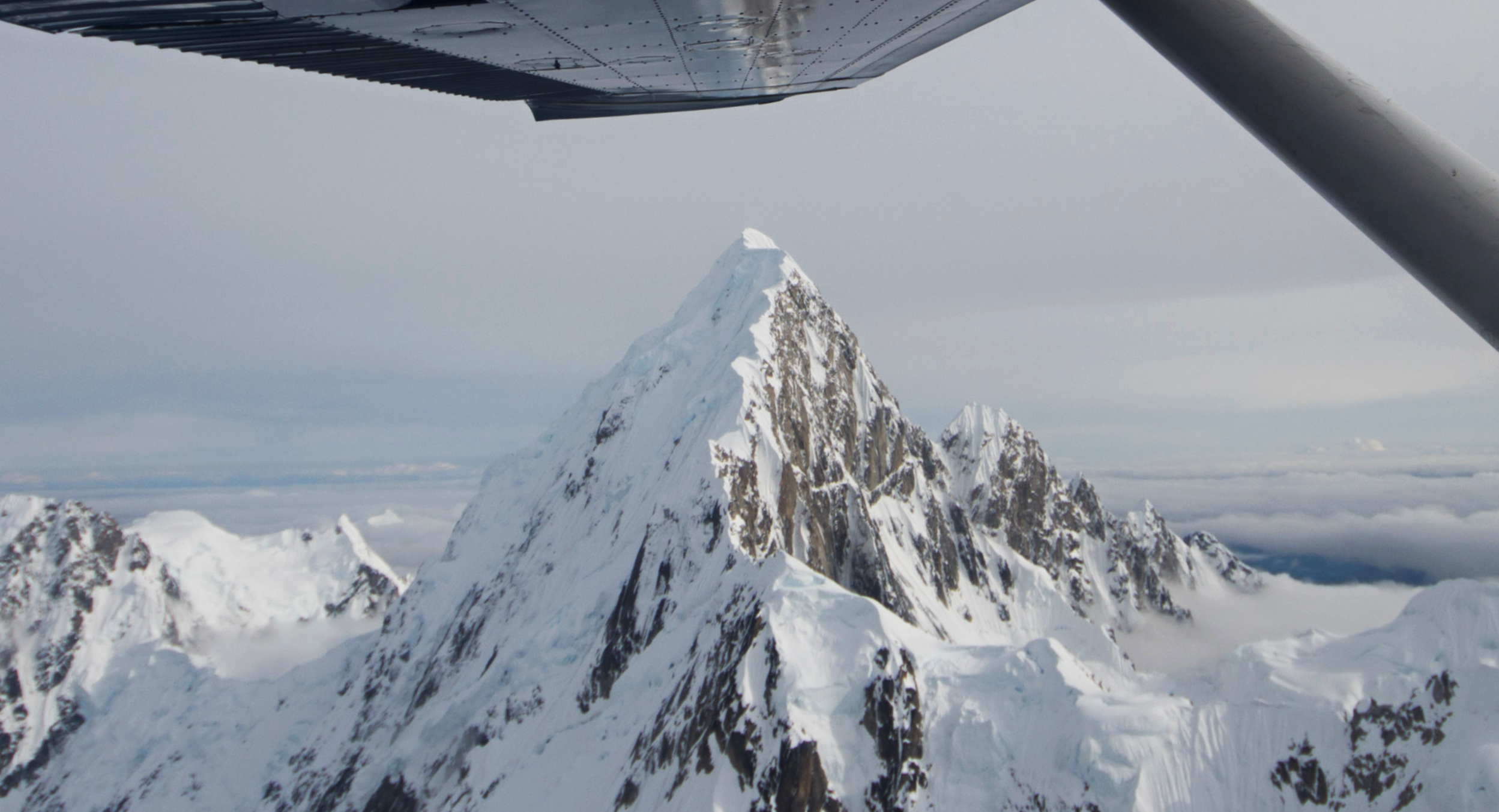
