= Carl Rungius =

German-American wildlife painter (1869–1959)

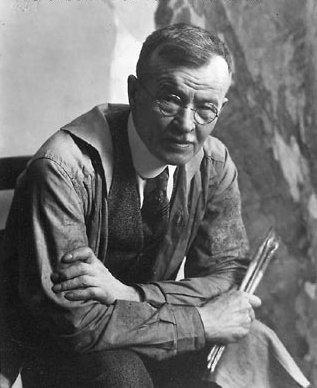
- Carl Rungius ca. 1920–1925
- Born: Carl Clemens Moritz Rungius; August 18, 1869; Rixdorf, Germany
- Died: October 21, 1959 (aged 90); New York City
- Education: Berlin Art Academy from 1888 to 1890
- Movement: Realism
- Awards: 1924 he won the Popular Prize from the Corcoran Gallery of Art in Washington, 1925 he won the Ellen P. Spayer Memorial Award of $300 at the annual exhibition of the National Academy of Design, 1926 he won a Carnegie Prize, 1929 he won the Salters medal for animal painting.
- Patrons: William Temple Hornaday, The Canadian Pacific Railway, New York Zoological Society, Franklin Roosevelt

Carl Clemens Moritz Rungius (August 18, 1869 – October 21, 1959) was a leading American wildlife artist. He was born in Germany though he immigrated to the United States and he spent his career painting in the western United States and Canada. Active primarily in the first half of the 20th century, he earned a reputation as the most important big game painter and the first career wildlife artist in North America.

== Early life in Germany ==
Rungius was born in Rixdorf, now a part of Berlin, Germany, to Pastor Heinrich Rungius (1833-1922) and Magdalene Fulda. Rungius spent most of his childhood in Britz, also part of Berlin. Rungius had seven sisters and one brother. His family had interests in art, nature, and taxidermy, and from an early age, Rungius enjoyed hunting and knew he wanted to be a wildlife painter. Upon reaching school age, Carl was sent away to live with his widowed grandmother in the village of Burg bei Magdeburg. He demonstrated a passion for hunting from a young age, and it’s this passion which would dominate his later life and be a tremendous influence on his artwork. From an early age, Rungius also showed ambition to be an artist. In his teenage years, an exhibition by Richard Friese, Germany’s foremost wildlife artist, reinforced Rungius’s ambition. He had several obstacles to overcome though before he would obtain his objective. Rungius had a tremendous dislike for school. Despite this, he completed his academic coursework and passed his examinations, qualifying for a mandatory year of military services. He served his one year of military service in 1891. His father also had strong oppositions to him becoming a painter. Eventually his father did relent, but only on the condition that Carl would start his profession in an acceptable fashion, by learning the trade of a house painter. For the next three summers, Rungius apprenticed as a wall and woodwork painter.

Rungius studied art at the Berlin Art Academy from 1888 to 1890. Rungius’s art education began with a course in ornamental design. He was not very interested in this however, and he increasingly spent his free time at the Berlin Zoo sketching and studying the animals there. Zoo animals were not subjects he could handle physically; he could not get under their skin and see for himself how muscle, bone, tendon and tissue melded together to form the living animal. In order to get a better look at the anatomy of animals, Rungius made frequent visits to the local glue factory to study animal anatomy in its most basic form. Rungius’s father often shot stray cats in his garden and would turn the carcass’s over to Carl. Although his work in the glue factory and with cats was unpleasant, Rungius felt it was critical to his artistic development.

== Trip to the United States ==
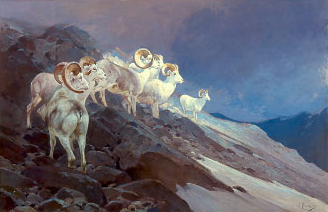
Wary Game, 1909

In 1894, Rungius's Uncle Clemens Fulda invited him to hunt moose in Maine. Shortly after, in 1895, he traveled to Wyoming, which for him was an exotic experience. Open skies, mountain scenes and big game abounded. He made extensive studies of his trophies, and stalked game, which allowed him to gain a better understanding of the animals he painted. His summer in Wyoming persuaded Rugius that the United States would be his new home; “I painted from the collected material and later in the spring of 1896, I went back to Germany...My decision to cut all ties with the Old World and to live in America got good was due in no small part to this first Wyoming trip. For my heart was in the West.”

In 1896, Rungius immigrated to the United States. After hunting and painting trips to New Brunswick in 1900-1909 and to the Yukon in 1904, Rugius’s fascination with the North American moose began.

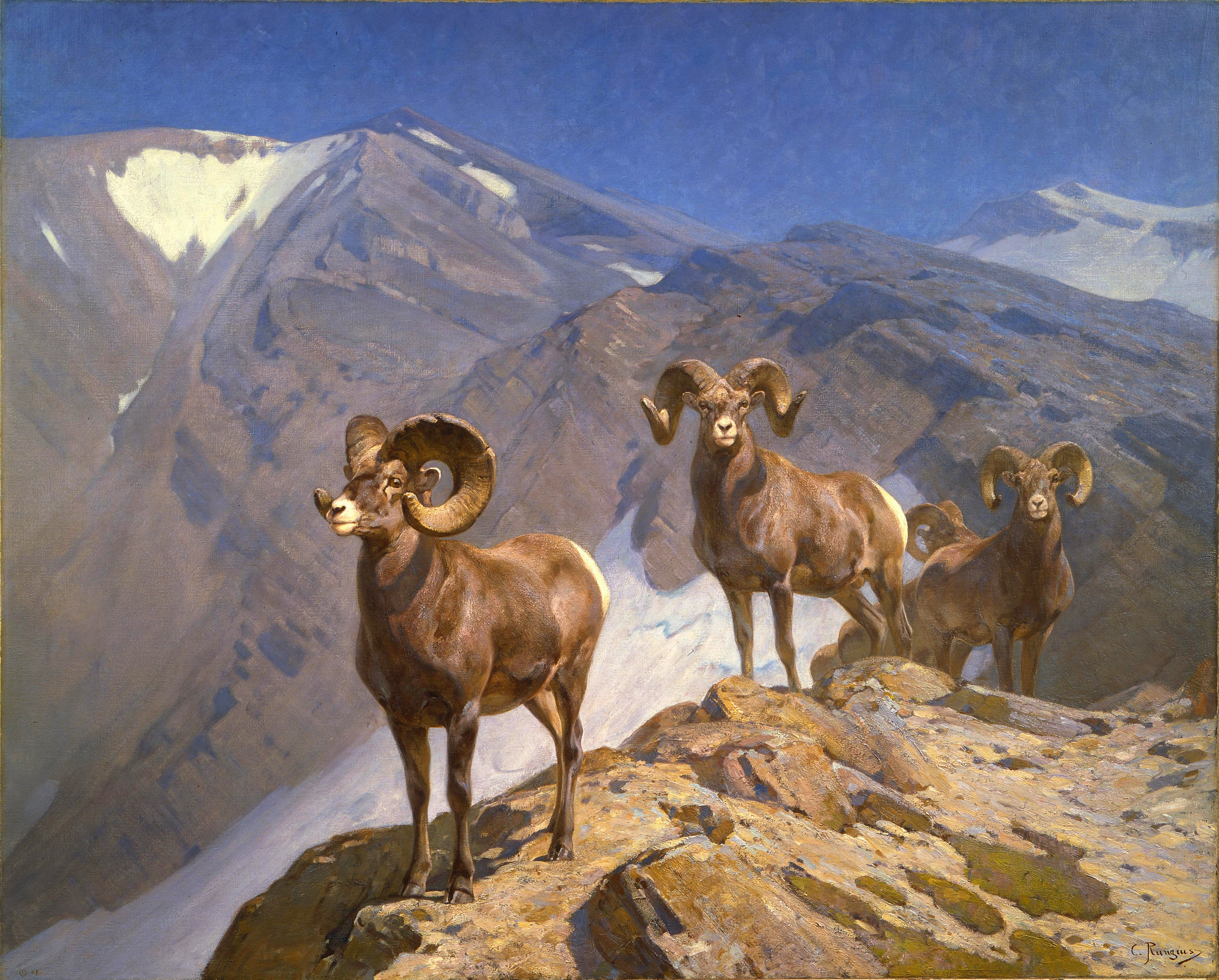
Carl Rungius - Big Horn Sheep on Wilcox Pass (1912)

Rungius found work, as hunters and naturalists commissioned wildlife illustrations for their magazines, books, and campaigns to protect endangered animals. Rungius’s arrival in the United States coincided with the recognition of the plight of the continent’s game animal and bird populations. Several concerned sportsmen had turned their energy to correcting the deteriorating situation, the most noteworthy being Theodore Roosevelt. Roosevelt was a leader in Conservation, fighting to end the waste of natural resources. Roosevelt established the United States Forest Service, signed into law the creation of five National Parks, and signed the 1906 Antiquities Act, under which he proclaimed 18 new United States National Monuments. He also established the first 51 Bird Reserves, four Game Preserves, and 150 National Forests, including Shoshone National Forest, the nation's first. Around 1909, Rungius gave up illustrating to pursue a career as a full-time easel painter. His illustrations, however, stayed in circulation long after, playing a large role in spreading information about ethical hunting. In early twentieth-century North America, there were few major zoos and photography was still in its infancy, so illustrations from books and periodicals were the public's main source of information concerning wildlife.

== Trip to the Canadian Rockies ==
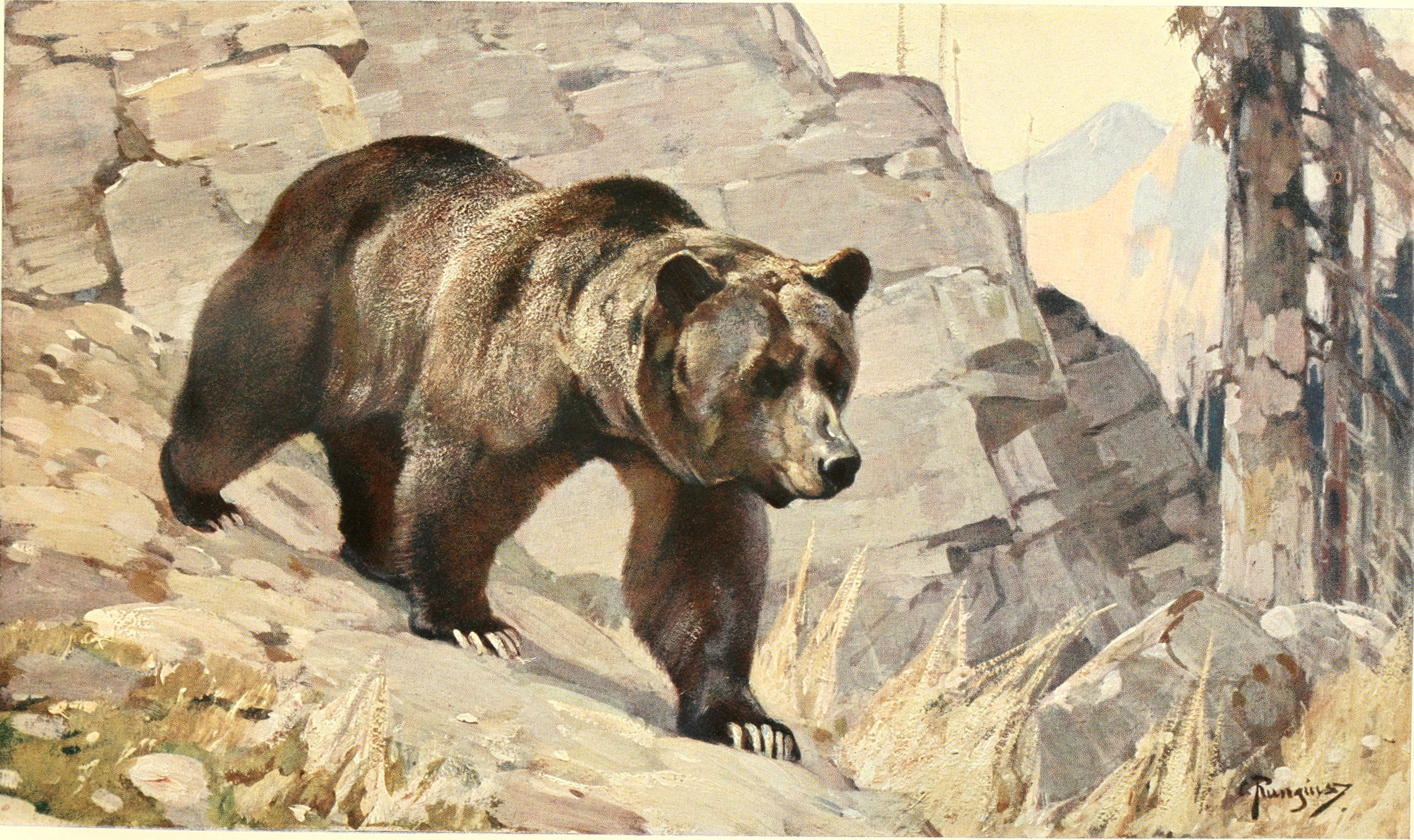
Bear, 1911

In 1910, Banff, Alberta tour guide Jimmy Simpson saw a reproduction of Rungius’s painting Wary Game, a painting of six Dall rams on a high spur of a wind-swept Yukon mountain ridge, in an issue of The Bulletin put out by the New York Zoological Society. Upon seeing the painting, Simpson declared “that fellow knows his animals and he knows his sheep.” Simpson wrote Rungius a letter in which he extended a generous invitation; if Rungius could get to Banff, Simpson would take him out on a sheep hunt at no cost. In 1910, Rungius accepted an offer to visit the Canadian Rockies, and would go on to paint a large number of his paintings there. He enjoyed the opportunities for hunting, exploration, and sport to such an extent that 1921, he built a studio in Banff called "The Paintbox." Rungius said that “I could not think of any more suitable place than Banff in Alberta. A province which has practically every species within its borders. Easy to reach and a cosmopolitan, broad-minded town right in the wilderness, at the same time offering all the comforts of a big city. My wife who had been with me here a couple of times also liked Banff and approved the idea.” Rungius worked in his Banff studio from April to October every year until his death in 1959.

== Art ==
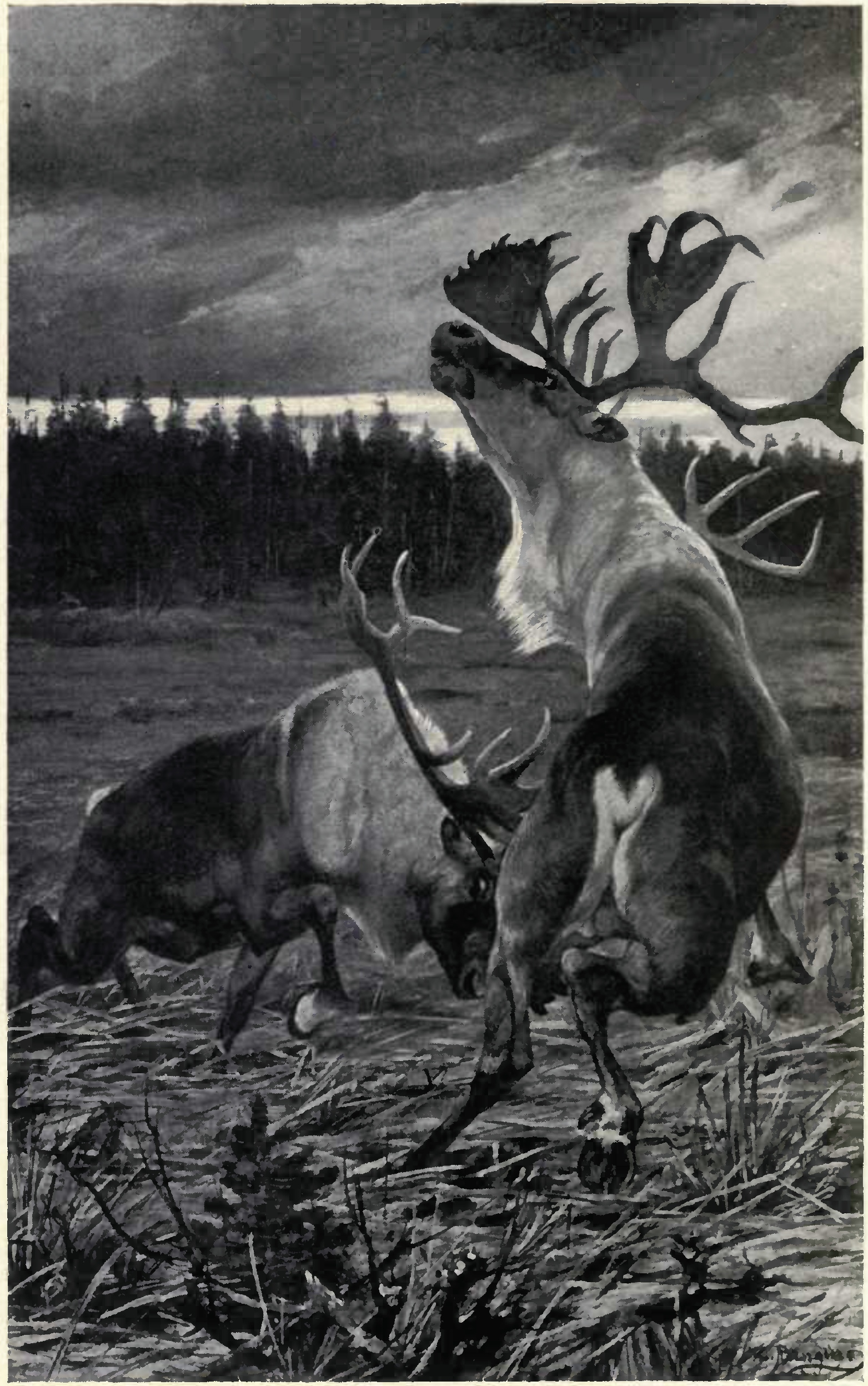
Roaring in a frenzy, the older bull upreared, wavered, and crashed backwards

Rungius was an avid sportsman, and spent more time in the wilderness than other artists. By direct observation in nature, he was able to gain an exceptional insight into the animals and their environment. Rungius painted both landscapes and wildlife, often with both into a single picture. He situated animals in their natural environment, a practice that was new to painting in early twentieth century North America. His paintings are highly romanticized, and represent an Eden-like world without any signs of a human impact.

Among other places, his works are featured at the American National Museum of Wildlife Art (which has the largest public collection of Rungius work), the Dutch Rijksmuseum Twenthe, and Calgary's Glenbow Museum. His work was also part of the painting event in the art competition at the 1928 Summer Olympics.

== Associations and clubs ==
Rungius was made a member of The Camp-Fire Club in 1896 (Runguis was in Germany when the club was founded but he was elected in absentia as one of the original twenty members). Rungius was also a member of the Boone and Crockett Club (member in 1927), The Salmagundi Club (1907), Outfitter for the annual climbing camps of the Alpine Club of Canada (1910), Associate Member of the National Academy of Design (1913, member and in 1920 he was elected as a full Academician), Honorary Scout with the Boy Scouts of America (1927), member of The Century Club, member of The Painters of the Far West, and a member Society of Animal Painters and Sculptors.

== Scouting ==
In 1927, the Boy Scouts of America created Honorary Scouts to distinguish "American citizens whose achievements in outdoor activity, exploration and worthwhile adventure are of such an exceptional character as to capture the imagination of boys...". Rungius was one of eighteen who were awarded this distinction.

== Death ==
Rungius died October 21, 1959, in New York City. After his death, Eric Harvie, the founder of the Glenbow Museum in Calgary, bought the entire Rungius estate including paintings, sketches, photographs, personal belongings and mementos, and the entire contents of his Banff and New York studios. This huge collection of 1,404 items makes Glenbow Museum the premier research centre in the world for Rungius scholars.

Rungius had his ashes scattered on Tunnel Mountain in Banff, Alberta, loving the view overlooking the town and the Bow Valley.

== See also ==
- Clarence Tillenius
