= Ekblaw =

Ekblaw is a surname. Notable people with the name include:

- Ariel Ekblaw (born 1992), American astronautical architect
- Walter Elmer Ekblaw (1882–1949), American scientist and explorer
- Evan Ekblaw (born 2001), American Design Engineer

== See also ==
- Mount Ekblaw, a mountain in Antarctica
