= Joi Ito =

Japanese-American entrepreneur

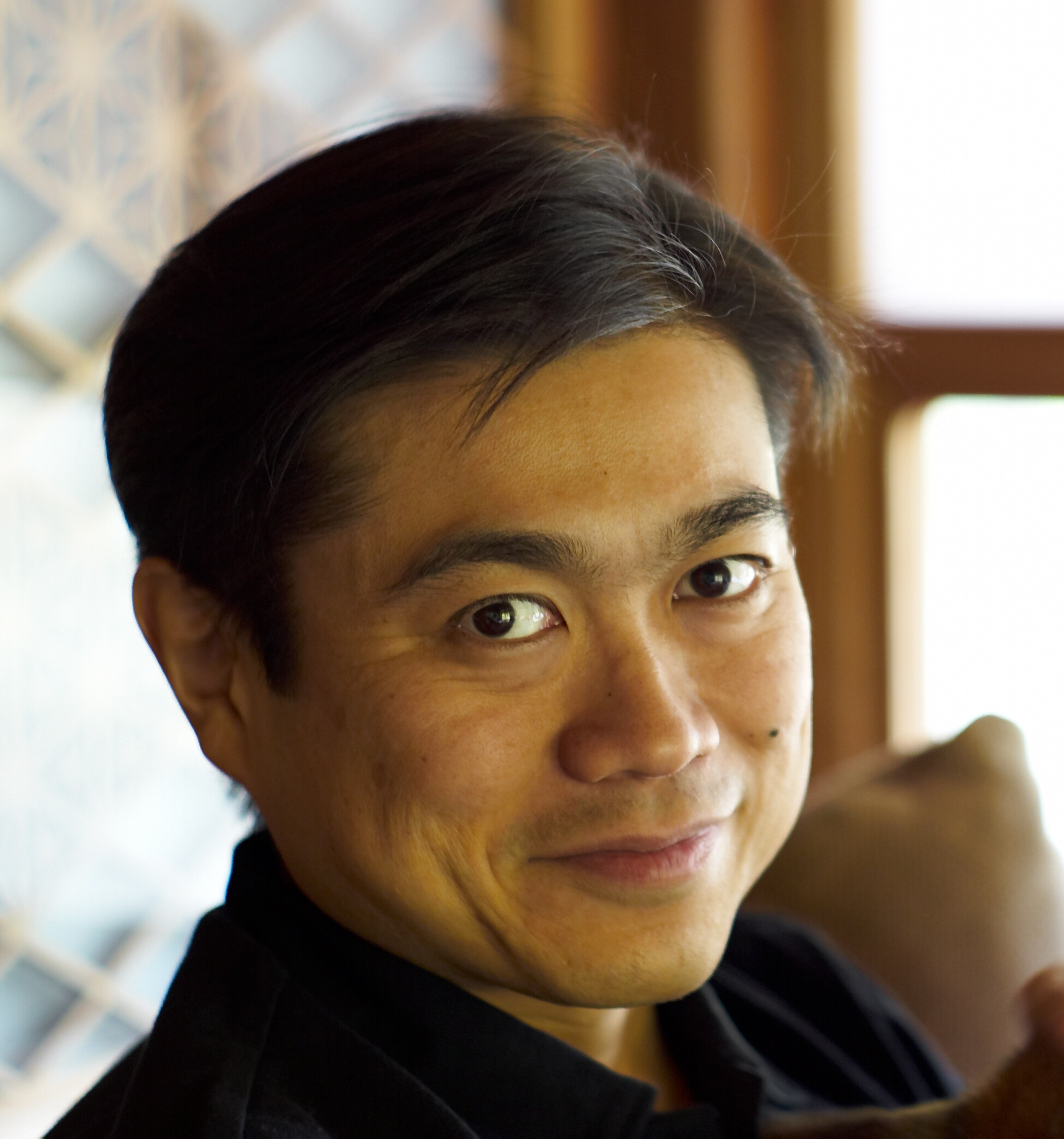
- Ito in 2007
- Born: June 19, 1966 (age 60); Kyoto, Japan
- Education: Tufts University (no degree); University of Chicago (no degree); The New School (no degree); Hitotsubashi University (no degree); Keio University (PhD)
- Known for: Blogging, Moblogging, Creative Commons, MIT Media Lab, Safecast, Common Crawl
- Relatives: Mizuko Ito (sister)
- Website: joi.ito.com

Joichi Ito (伊藤 穰一, Itō Jōichi; born June 19, 1966) is a Japanese entrepreneur and venture capitalist. He is the president of Chiba Institute of Technology. He is on the board of directors for the Gelephu Mindfulness City in Bhutan where he is also chairman of the Gelephu Investment Development Corporation (GIDC). He is a former director of the MIT Media Lab, former professor of the practice of media arts and sciences at MIT, and a former visiting professor of practice at Harvard Law School.

Ito has received recognition for his role as an entrepreneur focused on Internet and technology companies. He notably founded PSINet Japan, Infoseek Japan, and fintech company Digital Garage. Ito is founder and managing partner of Neoteny and GMJP, an early-stage fund investing in web3 in Japan. He is former board member and CEO of Creative Commons, the Electronic Privacy Information Center (EPIC), the Internet Corporation for Assigned Names and Numbers (ICANN), the Knight Foundation, The New York Times Company, the MacArthur Foundation, the Mozilla Foundation, the Open Source Initiative, the Sony Corporation, the and Common Crawl advisory board. Ito wrote a monthly column in the Ideas section of Wired magazine.

Following the exposure of his financial ties to Jeffrey Epstein, Ito resigned from his roles at MIT, Harvard, the MacArthur and Knight foundations, PureTech Health, and The New York Times Company in September 2019. Scrutiny resurfaced in February 2026 after the U.S. Justice Department release of millions of Epstein-related documents; it was revealed that Ito had a closer relationship with Epstein than previously known. The New York Times reported that Ito was a "prolific correspondent" with Epstein, having exchanged thousands of emails with him, and a "frequent visitor" to Epstein's private island. In early March, Ito stepped down from his role in the Global Startup Campus Initiative, a Japanese government-funded program, and announced he would leave his government advisory role at the Digital Agency’s Digital Society Initiative, and Reuters reported Ito would retire as an executive and board director of Digital Garage.

== Early life and education ==
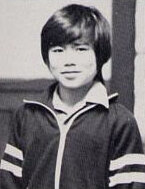
Ito, c. 1981

Ito was born in Kyoto, Japan. His family moved to Canada and then to the United States, when Ito was about three, to a suburb of Detroit, Michigan, where his father became a research scientist and his mother a secretary for Energy Conversion Devices, Inc., now Ovonics. The founder of his mother's company, Stanford R. Ovshinsky, was impressed with young Ito, whom he thought of almost as his son. Ovshinsky mentored the boy's interests in technology and social movements, and when Ito was 13, gave him work with scientists, saying, "He was not a child in the conventional sense." By the time he was 13, Ito was already working on his career, learning how to operate BBS and X.25 networks.

Ito and his sister Mizuko Ito spent summers in Japan with their grandmother, who taught them about traditional Japanese culture. At age 14, he returned to Japan, when his mother was promoted to president of Energy Conversion Devices Japan. He studied at the Nishimachi International School and, for high school, the American School in Japan in Tokyo. In that phase of his life, Ito also learned "street language, street smarts, and computers". One of the few Japanese using modems before networking deregulation reached Japan, in 1985, Ito had found The Source and the original MUD by his teens (and by 26, was working on his own MUD).

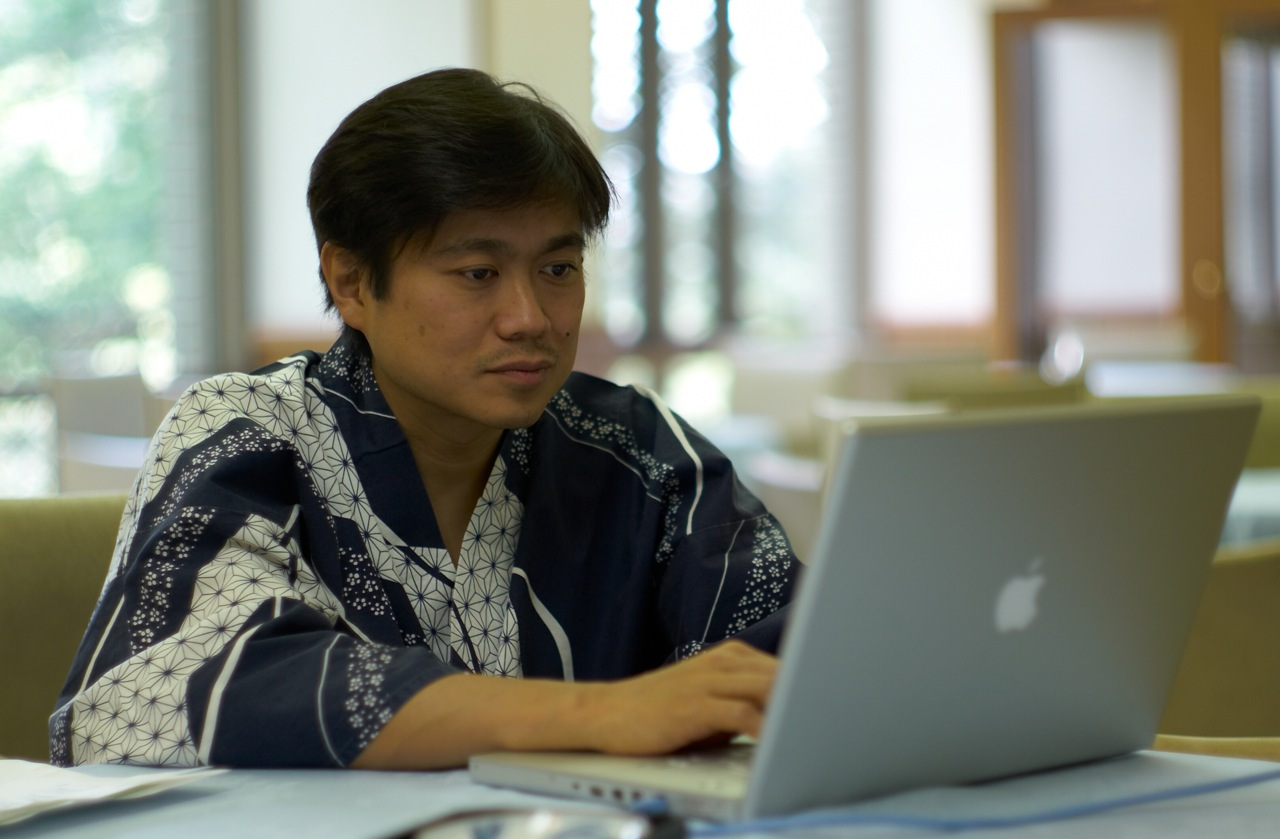
Ito in 2007

Ito returned to the United States to attend Tufts University as a computer science major, where he met, among others, Pierre Omidyar from France, later founder of eBay. As he deemed his course work too rigid and believed that learning computer science in school was "stupid", Ito dropped out of Tufts to work briefly for Ovonics. Ovshinsky encouraged him to return to school. Ito enrolled at the University of Chicago in physics but later dropped out as he found the rigorous and theoretical program required too much problem-solving rather than promoting an "intuitive" understanding: "I didn’t feel like spending four years solving problems. I was still stuck with professors and assistant professors who were telling me to memorize formulas and not try to understand things intuitively". In the fall of 1985, Ito became the first student to register for a pioneering program of online courses, offered by Connected Education, Inc., for undergraduate credit from The New School for Social Research. Ito also attended Hitotsubashi University, in Tokyo, according to his essay in Japanese. Ito earned a Ph.D. in media and governance from Keio University in 2018. His dissertation was titled, "The Practice of Change".

== Early career ==
Ito became a disc jockey working in nightclubs in Chicago such as the Limelight and Smart Bar, also working with Metasystems Design Group to start a virtual community in Tokyo. Later, Ito ran a nightclub in Roppongi, Japan, called XY Relax, with help from Joe Shanahan of Metro Chicago/Smart Bar. He helped bring industrial music from Chicago (Wax Trax) and later the rave scene, managing a DJ team and visual artists, including importing Anarchic Adjustment to Japan.

Ito was on the board of Culture Convenience Club (CCC), Tucows, and EPIC, and WITNESS. In October 2004, he was named to the board of ICANN for a three-year term starting December 2004. In August 2005, he joined the board of the Mozilla Foundation, until April 2016. He was on the board of the Open Source Initiative (OSI) from March 2005 until April 2007. He was a founding board member of Expression College for Digital Arts as well as the Zero One Art and Technology Network. In 1999, he was the associate to Mr. Mount (the executive producer) on the film The Indian Runner. Ito also was a board member of Energy Conversion Devices from 1995 to 2000.

Ito is a venture capitalist and angel investor and was an early stage investor in Kickstarter, Twitter, Six Apart, Technorati, Flickr, Wikia, SocialText, Dopplr, Last.fm, Rupture, Kongregate, Fotopedia, Diffbot, Formlabs, 3Dsolve and other Internet companies.

=== Journalism ===
Ito has written op-eds for the Asian Wall Street Journal and The New York Times and has published articles in numerous other magazines and newspapers. He has written regular columns in The Daily Yomiuri, Mac World Japan, Asahi Pasocom, Asahi Doors, and other media sources. His photographs have been used in The New York Times online, BusinessWeek, American Heritage, Wired News, Forbes, and BBC News. He was on the early editorial mastheads of Wired and Mondo 2000. He has authored and co-authored a number of books including Dialog – Ryu Murakami X Joichi Ito with Ryu Murakami, and Freesouls: Captured and Released with Christopher Adams, a book of Ito's photographs that includes essays by several prominent figures in the free culture movement. He has hosted televisions shows including The New Breed, SimTV and a TV show called Super-Presentation airing weekly in Japan on NHK.

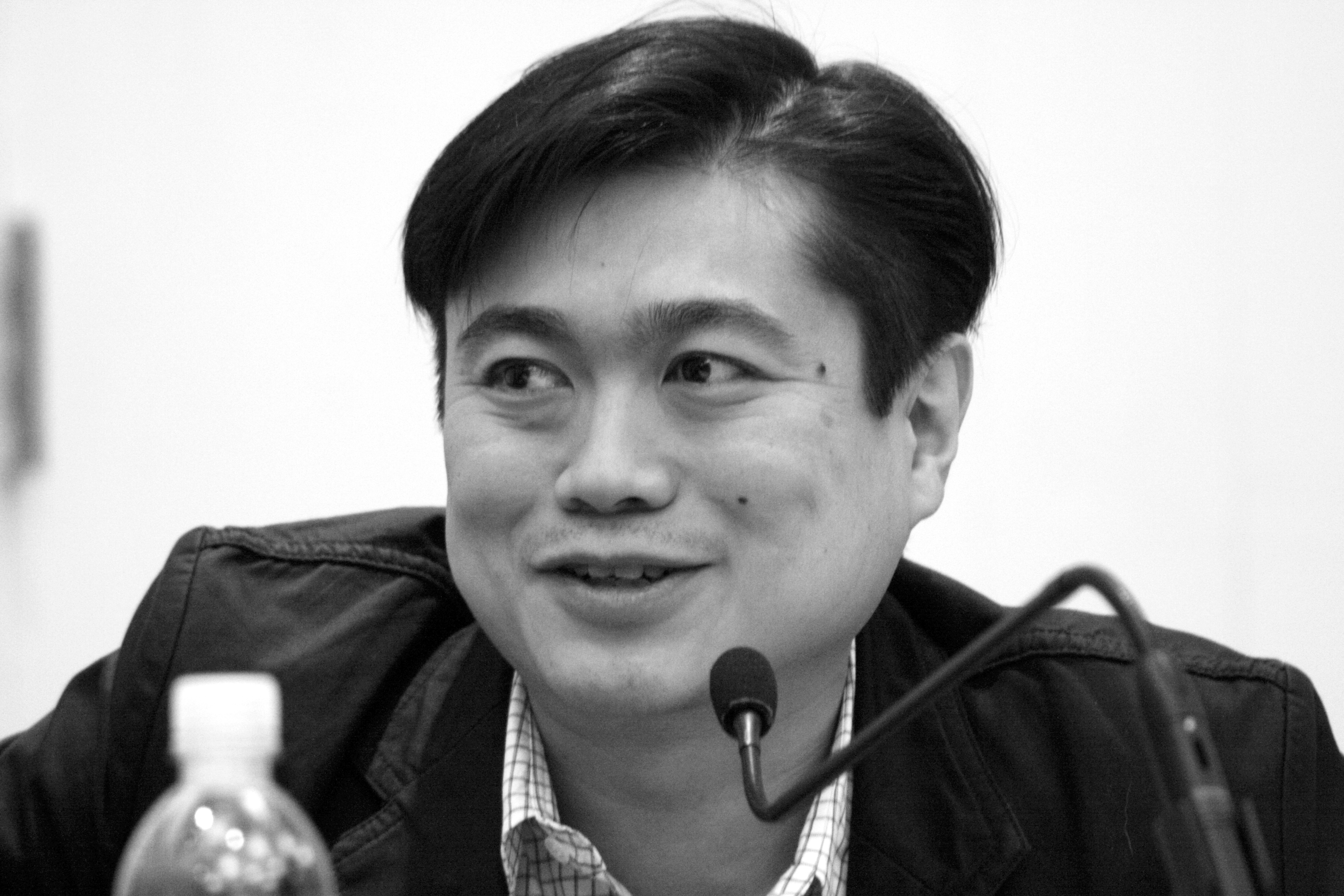
Ito in a 2008 Creative Commons panel discussion

=== Creative Commons ===
Ito served as a board member, chairman of the board, and CEO of Creative Commons, a nonprofit organization dedicated to promoting the legal sharing and reuse of content. As an influential figure in the organization's leadership, Ito was credited with playing a key role in expanding both the funding and the global reach of Creative Commons, which grew to include affiliates in more than 70 countries. His selection as chairman in 2006, replacing founder Lawrence Lessig, was specifically cited as a reflection of Creative Commons' increasing interest in supporting the integration of CC licenses and principles within commercial applications and the broader "sharing economy". He later served as CEO, during which time he focused on accelerating Creative Commons' efforts in education and open educational resources (OER). Due to his efforts, Al Jazeera, the White House, Wikipedia, and Google all began releasing material under the Creative Commons licenses.

=== Safecast ===
Following the 2011 Fukushima Daiichi nuclear disaster, Sean Bonner, Pieter Franken, and Ito co-founded the citizen science initiative Safecast in March 2011 to address the lack of transparent and reliable environmental radiation data provided by the Japanese government. Safecast, which is primarily volunteer-run, designed and built low-cost, mobile Geiger counter devices, such as the bGeigie and bGeigie Nano, that use GPS to enable citizens to crowdsource and upload highly localized radiation measurements. This effort resulted in the creation of the world's largest open dataset of background radiation measurements, establishing a model for open data and citizen-led environmental monitoring.

=== MIT Media Lab (2011–2019) ===
In April 2011, Ito was named the director of the MIT Media Lab; he began in this role on September 1, 2011, as the lab's fourth director. His appointment was called an "unusual choice" since Ito studied at two colleges, but did not finish his degrees. "The choice is radical, but brilliant", said Larry Smarr, director of Calit2. Nicholas Negroponte, Media Lab's co-founder and chairman emeritus, described the choice as bringing the media to "Joi's world". In an interview with Asian Scientist Magazine, Ito discussed his vision for the MIT Media Lab, and how he liked the word "learning" better than the word "education".

Ito was tasked with managing the MIT Media Lab annual budget of approximately $75 million, primarily funded through a consortium of about 90 corporate sponsors who pay a membership fee. This unique funding model allowed the lab's faculty and 230 graduate students to bypass the typical fundraising requirements, such as writing grant proposals, by distributing the pooled funds internally. While corporate members (including companies like Lego, Toshiba, and ExxonMobil) received an early look at inventions, the lab maintains its research freedom and has explicitly fired companies for being "too bottom-line oriented" or attempting to dictate product outcomes. The lab's mission has been to foster innovation without being bound to contracts or quarterly profits, enabling researchers to explore ideas that may lead to future technologies like mind-surfing, advanced prosthetics, and "food computers" for controlled agriculture. Ito wrote an essay in The New York Times about the importance of open innovation and how less regulation promotes innovation.

In 2012, Ito discussed in a Wired magazine interview the coming chaos of transformation brought about by decreasing costs of innovation. Ito first highlights how Moore's Law has decreased the cost of innovation, collaboration and distribution. Next, because of these increases in innovation, massive societal transformation are under way in a chaotic and sometimes destructive fashion and Ito highlighted some principles for how to stay resilient in this accelerating transformation, one could perceive as unpredictable change. Ito notably outlined nine principles of resilience.

In 2013, Ito proposed, in an interview in Fast Company, a solution for urban renewal is for cities to get out of the way and make it easier for young people to innovate. In 2013, he announced an MIT Media Lab partnership with an independent investment fund called "E14" to give MIT Media Lab students a six-month runway to launch a startup. Upon return on investments, the MIT Media Lab also receives money back to the institute. As of 2025, E14 is still in operation and has backed more than 100 Media Lab companies and has organized event programming for the MIT Media Lab startup community.

Wired interviewed Ito in 2014 about the future of making being the fusing of technology with living matter. That year, Ito and Tim Brown from IDEO held a conversation about the future of making at SXSW Interactive Festival.

Ito gave the keynote at the 2015 Oreilly's Solid Conference titled, "Why Bio is the New Digital". Ito and Media Lab co-founder Nicholas Negroponte discussed with Wired magazine about the major transformative technologies that came from the Media Lab including e-Ink, touchscreens, GPS and wearables.

In June 2016, Ito was appointed professor of the practice of media arts and sciences at MIT. Ito wrote an essay about the future of work in the age of artificial intelligence after attending a meeting of technologists, economists and European philosophers and theologians including Andrew McAfee, Erik Brynjolfsson, Reid Hoffman, Sam Altman, and Father Eric Salobir.

John Markoff discussed his work with Reid Hoffman on Artificial Intelligence Ethics in The New York Times. At the time, there were three groups working on AI Ethics intensively, the MIT Media Lab effort spearheaded by Ito and Hoffman later unveiled in 2017, a Stanford project called the One Hundred Year Study on Artificial Intelligence which included Google's parent company, Alphabet, Amazon, Facebook, IBM and Microsoft. And then separately, Google's DeepMind decided to work on their own effort. The MIT Media Lab effort stated its aim was to "keep society in the loop." Ito, in particular, stated the importance of Artificial Intelligence Ethics is to make sure computer scientists are interacting with social scientists and philosophers. In November, Ito and then US President Barack Obama had a conversation about Artificial Intelligence, neural nets, and self-driving cars published in Wired magazine. In December, Ito wrote a The New York Times op-ed, "Well-Intentioned Uses of Technology Can Go Wrong". Ito proposed that the emerging artificial intelligence trend where engineers train machines to augment collective intelligence, be called "extended intelligence" or E.I. He noted that the challenge with E.I. is that it can amplify both the best and worst aspects of society. He stated that it is essential to develop a framework for how ethics, government, educational system and media evolve in the age of machine intelligence.

David Kirkpatrick and Ito conversed at the 2017 World Economic Forum in Davos where Ito stated that "science and technology alone will not win in the Fourth Industrial Revolution".

In 2017, under Ito's leadership as Media Lab director, the MIT Media Lab launched the Space Exploration Initiative at the "Beyond the Cradle: Envisioning a New Space Age" symposium, which he personally welcomed to 250 attendees and 300+ global livestream viewers. Ito, serving as a principal investigator alongside MIT VP Maria Zuber, framed space as the ultimate convergence of art, design, science, and engineering—driving a new multidisciplinary program that had already engaged over 40 faculty and students (and continued to expand across MIT departments) to pioneer accessible technologies for interplanetary life, democratize "open space", and apply space innovations to Earth. The student-initiated event, organized by PhD candidates Ariel Ekblaw and Dan Novy, featured NASA astronauts, sci-fi visionaries, and industry leaders, reinforcing Ito's vision of space exploration as a creative, inclusive mission to inspire humanity's next generation.

In 2017, Ito along with Neha Narula stated, "the Blockchain will do to the financial system what the Internet did to media" in the Harvard Business Review. Ito co-founded the Ethics and Governance of Artificial Intelligence Fund which received US$5.9 Million split between the MIT Media Lab and Berkman Klein Center for Internet & Society at Harvard University. Ito was interviewed by NPR about citizen science and how everyday citizens can help gather data as with his project Safecast which launched after the Fukushima Daiichi nuclear disaster to gather radiation data in March 2011.

In 2018, Ito and Jonathan Zittrain co-taught a collaborative Harvard-M.I.T. digital ethics course titled, "The Ethics and Governance of Artificial Intelligence". Ito wrote about the limits of explainability in Wired magazine related to the research of MIT Media Lab researcher Josh Tenenbaum. The article argues that human intuition—powered by innate "intuitive engines" for physics, social dynamics, and rapid probabilistic judgments—remains undervalued in AI research and scientific reductionism, which prioritize explainable statistical models trained on vast data but lack true causal understanding. By contrasting infant learning through real-world interaction with AI's pattern-matching limitations, it calls for embracing unexplainable intuition to advance AI and foster humility in tackling complex, nonlinear problems like ecology.

That year, Ito wrote in Wired magazine about the paradox of Universal Basic Income (UBI), an idea that has historically attracted rare bipartisan support from figures like Milton Friedman and Martin Luther King Jr., but simultaneously faces opposition from both conservatives and liberals. Touted as a potential solution to severe income disparity and mass job displacement due to automation, Ito wrote that the concept is plagued by the financial difficulty articulated by researcher Luke Martinelli: "an affordable UBI is inadequate, and an adequate UBI is unaffordable." He went on to say conservative critics worry about the cost and the potential for a decrease in the incentive to work, while skeptical liberals fear it would be used by politicians as a pretext to dismantle the existing social safety net and empower employers to lower wages. Nevertheless, the article highlights ongoing trials, such as Sam Altman's Basic Income Project, and concrete proposals, including Chris Hughes' plan to expand the Earned Income Tax Credit (EITC) and fund it through increased taxes on the wealthiest, as necessary steps toward an evidence-based understanding of UBI's actual economic and social impact.

Ito proposed that artificial intelligence should be viewed as a "mirror" rather than a "crystal ball", arguing that the technology reflects existing societal biases rather than providing objective predictions. He suggested that by recognizing AI as a reflection of human and institutional flaws, society can use these tools to identify and address systemic inequalities.

From 2018 until 2019, Ito was a member of the "Council on Extended Intelligence", an initiative focused the ethics and governance of Artificial Intelligence, launched by the MIT Media Lab and the Institute of Electrical and Electronics Engineers (IEEE).

The Principles
Resilience over Strength	Pull over Push	Risk over Safety
Systems over Objects	Compasses over Maps	Practice over Theory
Disobedience over Compliance	Emergence over Authority	Learning over Education

==== Philosophy and leadership principles ====
Ito's leadership at the Media Lab was guided by his nine principles, which emphasized emergent systems over traditional authority.

==== MLTalks series and interdisciplinary dialogue ====
Ito institutionalized the MLTalks series (originally known as the Media Lab Conversations Series). This platform served as a public forum for antidisciplinary dialogue, bringing together global leaders, activists, and researchers to discuss the intersection of technology, society, and ethics. Significant sessions included:

- Global Health and Activism: In November 2014, Ito hosted a discussion on the challenges of fighting Ebola with Ophelia Dahl, Dr. Megan Murray, and David Sengeh.
- Director's Fellows Panels: In January 2015, a panel featured Sultan Sooud Al-Qassemi, Maurice Ashley, Marko Ahtisaari, Gabriella Gomez-Mont, and Baratunde Thurston, focusing on how diverse backgrounds in activism and chess catalyze creative collaboration. He also hosted the Presidential Innovation Fellows, including Smita Satiani and Kyla Fullenwider.
- Space and the Anthropocosmos: Conversations with Ariel Ekblaw and Joseph Paradiso explored the "Space Exploration Initiative" and the future of life beyond Earth.
- Technology, Narrative, and Humanity: Ito hosted influential thinkers such as Douglas Rushkoff (discussing Team Human), Neal Stephenson, Warren Ellis, and Jaron Lanier.
- Ethics, Justice, and Civil Rights: These dialogues featured Ibram X. Kendi on antiracism, Shaka Senghor on criminal justice reform, and Julia Angwin on "Quantifying Forgiveness."
- Science and Education: Conversations included Howard Rheingold on networks, Jill Lepore on the "death of facts," and Temple Grandin on neurodiversity.
- Design and Failure: A session with Colleen Macklin and John Sharp explored the utility of failure in the creative process based on their book Iterate.
- Digital Rights and Governance: Ito held discussions with Jan Fuller on computer crime and digital evidence, and with Creative Commons leaders Ryan Merkley, Jane Park and Diane Peters.

=== Departure from MIT (2019) ===
In 2019, revelations of Ito's connections with Jeffrey Epstein, a convicted sex offender, shed light on the extent of Epstein's monetary gifts to the Media Lab and to Ito's startups outside of MIT. Ito initially wrote an apology but refused to resign, which led to the departure of several prominent Media Lab members, including Ethan Zuckerman, director of the MIT's Center for Civic Media, and Media Lab visiting scholar J. Nathan Matias. Calls for Ito to resign were followed by a website (wesupportjoi.org) and letter in support of Ito which appeared in late August signed by more than 100 people including Lawrence Lessig, Hiroshi Ishii, Stewart Brand, Nicholas Negroponte, Jonathan Zittrain, and George M. Church. However, the website was taken down after further details emerged. Ito later admitted to taking $525,000 in funding from Epstein for the lab, and permitting Epstein to invest $1.2 million in Ito's personal investment funds.

==== Further revelations and leaked emails ====
On September 6, 2019, an article by Ronan Farrow in The New Yorker alleged that the lab led by Ito had "a deeper fund-raising relationship with Epstein" than it had acknowledged, and that the lab attempted to conceal the extent of its contacts with him. The article, based on leaked emails between Epstein, Ito and others, alleged that "Ito and other lab employees took numerous steps to keep Epstein's name from being associated with the donations he made or solicited", and that Ito specifically solicited individual donations from Epstein. The article further claimed that Epstein "appeared to serve as an intermediary between the lab and other wealthy donors, soliciting millions of dollars in donations from individuals and organizations" and that "Epstein was credited with securing at least $7.5 million in donations for the lab". Ito, in an email to The New York Times, said The New Yorker report was "full of factual errors".

In his MIT fundraising role, Ito consulted with persons inside and outside MIT about the propriety of accepting Epstein's money—finding it was appropriate. MIT senior leadership added conditions including gifts' anonymity. According to Harvard Law School professor Lawrence Lessig the anonymity of the Jeffrey Epstein donations was to avoid "whitewashing" Epstein's reputation and not to conceal the relationship between Ito and Epstein.

==== Resignations ====
In September 2019, Ito resigned as director of the Media Lab and as an MIT professor shortly after The New Yorker article. He also resigned from his visiting professorship at Harvard University. in addition he relinquished a number of other roles on September 7 amid the controversy:

- Ito left the board of the John D. and Catherine T. MacArthur Foundation. The MacArthur Foundation wrote, "the recent reports of Ito's behavior in The New Yorker, if true, would not be in keeping with the values of MacArthur. Most importantly, our hearts go out to the girls and women who survived the abuse of Jeffrey Epstein."
- He resigned from the board of The New York Times Company following the Epstein revelations. The New York Times said "Our newsroom will continue its aggressive reporting on Mr. Epstein, investigating both the individuals and the broader systems of power that enabled him for so many years."
- Ito resigned from the board of trustees of the John S. and James L. Knight Foundation, who wrote, "Jeffrey Epstein's crimes continue to reverberate, most painfully with the girls and women who were his victims. We extend our deepest sympathies to them."
- He resigned as the chairman of PureTech Health. The company said that "given circumstances related to the MIT Media Lab, we agreed that Joi's resignation from PureTech was appropriate".

As a result of the release of the Epstein files in January 2026, there was a disclosed exchange between Ito and Epstein, discussing a donation to MIT that was 'bounced'.

==== Results of MIT investigation ====
The president of MIT—who had himself signed a letter of thanks to Epstein—requested an "immediate, thorough and independent" investigation into the "extremely serious" and "deeply disturbing allegations about the engagement between individuals at the Media Lab and Jeffrey Epstein". On January 10, 2020, MIT released results of its fact-finding. Bloomberg reported that president Reif said "senior members of his team 'knew in general terms about Epstein's history—that he had been convicted and had served a sentence and that Joi believed that he had stopped his criminal behavior.'"

The investigation was conducted by Goodwin Procter LLP whose partners were retained to "conduct investigation into both Epstein's donations and Epstein's other interactions with MIT". The MIT report found that "donations to MIT were driven either by former Media Lab Director Joi Ito or by Seth Lloyd, a professor of mechanical engineering and physics, not by MIT's central administration". However, the report also states that certain members of MIT's Senior Team "were aware of, and approved, Epstein's donations to support Ito and the Media Lab". Furthermore, the report found that "contrary to certain media reports, neither Epstein nor his foundations was ever coded as 'disqualified' in MIT's donor systems. Further, the code 'disqualified' does not mean that a person or entity is 'blacklisted' or prohibited from donating to the institute. Rather, the term 'disqualified' is a database code for any donor who previously donated to MIT but presently is dormant or is no longer interested in giving to MIT." The report's executive summary ends with the finding that "since MIT had no policy or processes for handling controversial donors in place at the time, the decision to accept Epstein's post-conviction donations cannot be judged to be a policy violation. But it is clear that the decision was the result of collective and significant errors in judgment that resulted in serious damage to the MIT community."

== Later career ==
=== Japanese government appointments (2021–) ===
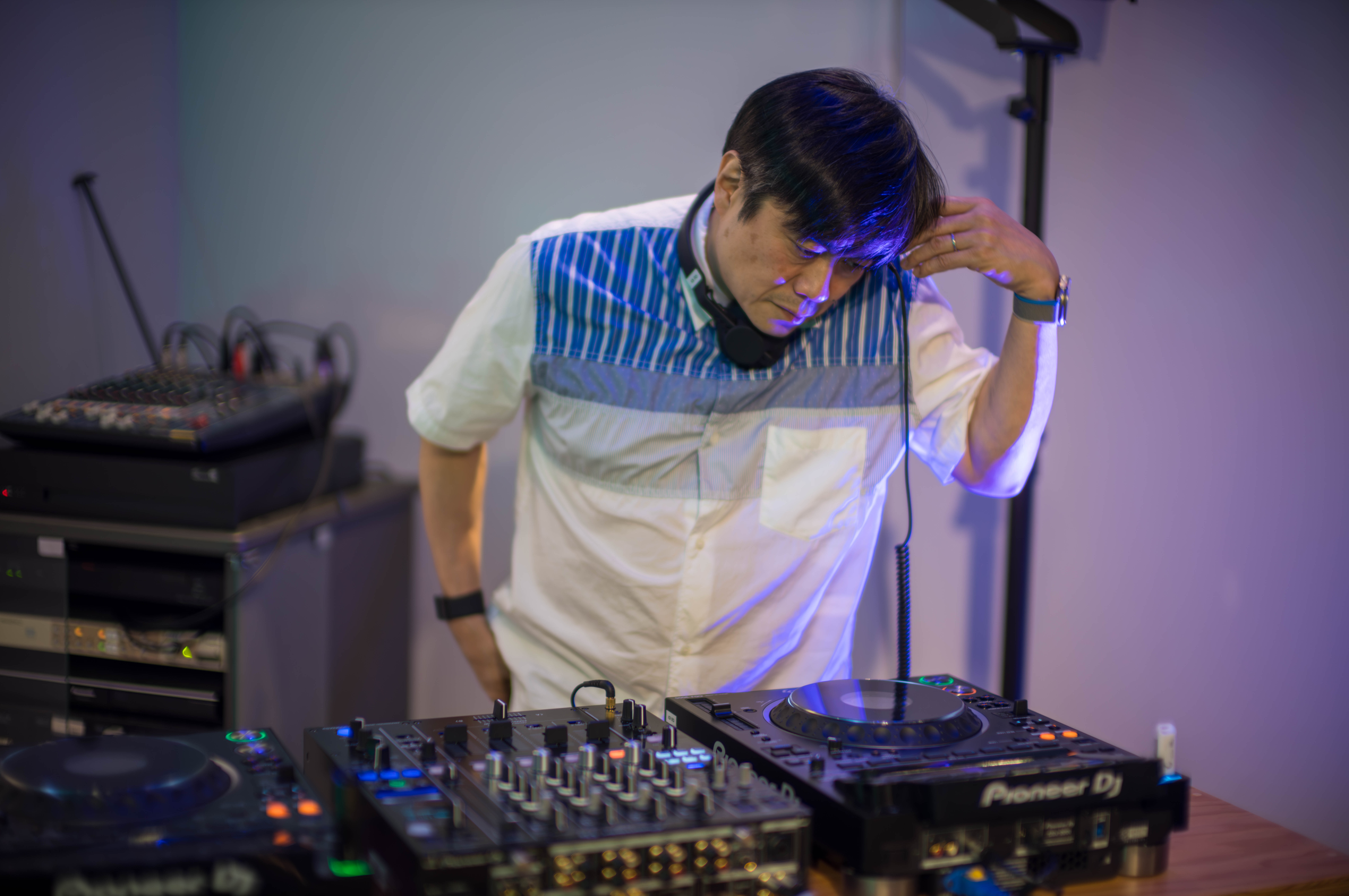
Ito at Dig DAO kickoff event, July 2023

In September 2021, after Japan's Digital Agency was established, Ito was appointed as one of the members of the Digital Society Council of the Digital Agency of Japan.

Ito is an executive advisor to the Office of GSC Initiative Promotion of the Cabinet Office of Japan, a position he announced he planned to leave after March 2026. He is an advisory board member of the Ministry of Economy, Trade and Industry's Demonstration Project for the Construction of Digital Public Goods Using Web 3.0 and Blockchain.

=== Chiba Institute of Technology ===
In June 2023, Ito was named the 14th President of the Chiba Institute of Technology. His first public appearance as president is at the Japan-U.S. Research Collaboration Week. In September 2023, he outlined his vision for the future of Chiba Institute of Technology in the President's Message.

In July 2025, at the initial 2025 Symposium on Design and Science, Ito launched the Chiba Institute of Technology (Chibatech) School of Design & Science. This is the university's first English-language program, starting with seven faculty members, Hiro (Sputniko) Ozaki, Catharina Maracke, Joe Austerweil, Mizuki Oka, Ira Winder, Hiroki Kojima and Daum Kim. Coinciding with the launch, Ito and the Henkaku Center at Chiba Institute of Technology (Chibatech) awarded artist Christine Sun Kim the inaugural Radical Transformation Award.

==== Center for Radical Transformation at CIT (2021–) ====
In December 2021, Ito was appointed director of the Center for Radical Transformation (CRT) at Chiba Institute of Technology, Japan. He also is a member of CIT's board of trustees.

=== Artificial intelligence governance ===
In October 2025, Ito was named to the Kazakhstan Artificial Intelligence Council of Kazakhstan which includes 16 top global AI leaders including Ebtesam Almazrouei, John Hopcroft, Peter Norvig, and Kai-Fu Lee.

=== Neurodiversity ===
In a 2018 article for Wired titled "The Educational Tyranny of the Neurotypicals", Ito argued that traditional education systems designed for standardized, industrial-era outcomes fail neurodiverse students, and that interest-driven and project-based learning approaches are better suited for diverse neural types. He noted that MIT has historically provided a place for non-neurotypical individuals with extraordinary skills to gather and form community. Ito had previously discussed neurodiversity with President Barack Obama in their 2016 Wired conversation, noting that many MIT students might be considered on the spectrum.

After returning to Japan, Ito observed that the Japanese educational system lagged behind in understanding and accommodating neurodivergence. In a 2022 podcast interview, he noted that Japan still approached neurological differences with an outdated mindset focused on "fixing" children to be "normal", whereas the United States had shifted toward education adapted to each child's characteristics.

In September 2023, Ito co-founded the Neurodiversity Nonprofit Organization with Rizuki Matsumoto to promote educational and social transformation. In 2024, they launched the Neurodiversity School in Tokyo (NSIT), a bilingual alternative school in Minami-Aoyama combining the Floortime developmental method with the Reggio Emilia approach; Matsumoto's Machino Research Institute is Japan's sole link to the international Reggio Emilia network. The school serves children ages 3–9 of all neurotypes in an inclusive environment. The organization also established Neurodiversity Potential, a community aimed at spreading awareness of neurodiversity values and creating a social movement in Japan.

Through the Neurodiversity Potential project, Ito has collaborated with researchers including his sister Professor Mizuko Ito of the University of California, Irvine and scholars from Purdue University to explore how technology and social systems can better accommodate neurological differences. In 2024, Ito and Matsumoto published a book on neurodiversity, 普通をずらして生きる ニューロダイバーシティ入門.

== Personal life ==
In 2008, Ito married Mizuka Kurogane, now addressed as Mizuka Ito.

Ito's sister, called Mimi, is Mizuko Ito, a cultural anthropologist studying media technology use. Ito's second cousin is musician Cornelius.

Ito is one of Timothy Leary's godsons—a close, nontraditional familial relationship that Leary reportedly developed for a few of his friends' children. Ito served on the advisory board for the Timothy Leary Archives.

Ito lives and works in Tokyo, Japan.

== Recognition and honors ==
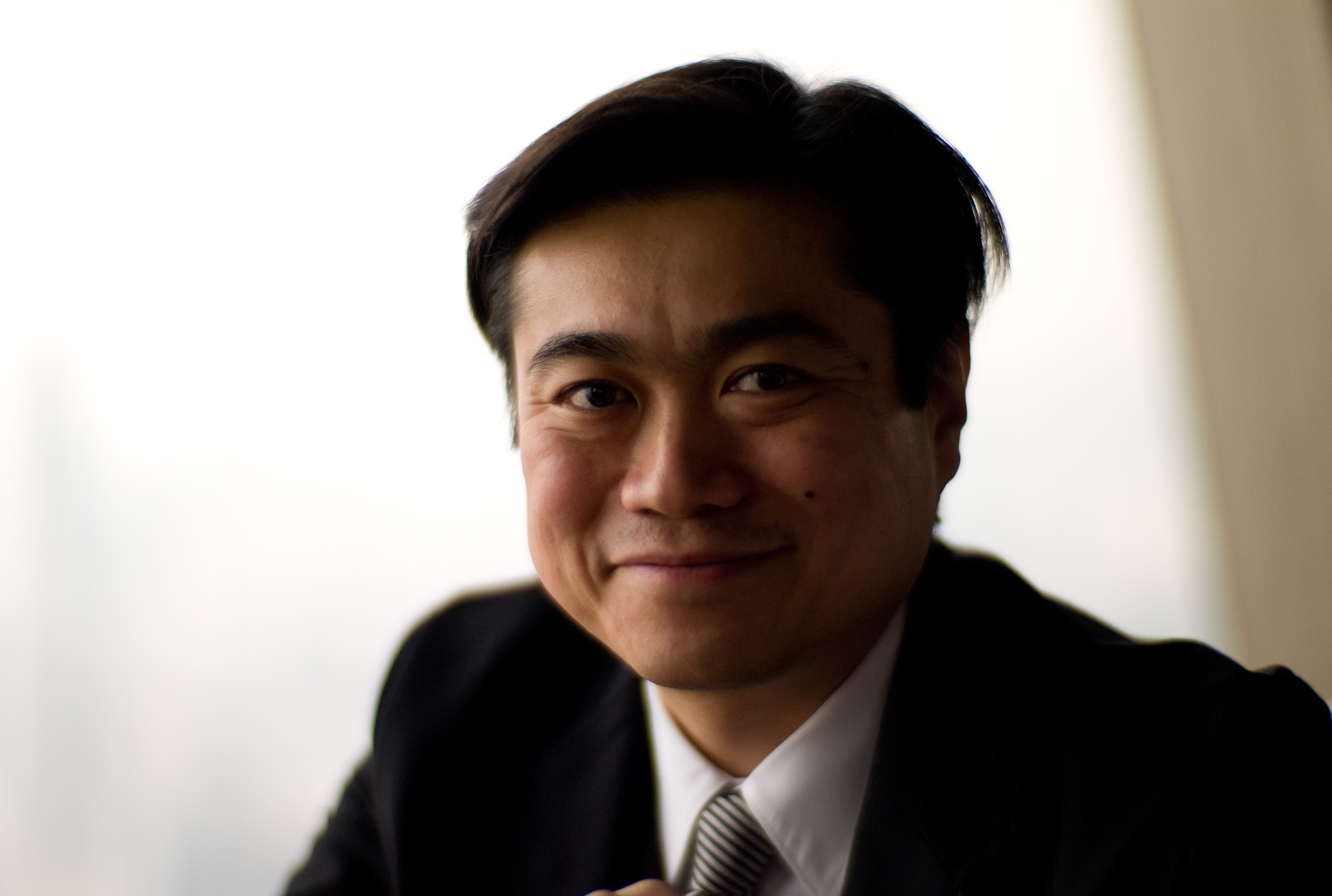
Ito in 2008

Ito was listed by Time magazine as a member of the "Cyber-Elite" in 1997. He was also named one of the 50 "Stars of Asia" in the "Entrepreneurs and Dealmakers" category by BusinessWeek and commended by the Japanese Ministry of Posts and Telecommunications for supporting the advancement of IT in 2000. He was selected by the World Economic Forum in 2001 as one of the "Global Leaders for Tomorrow" and chosen by Newsweek as a member of the "Leaders of The Pack (high technology industry)" in 2005, and listed by Vanity Fair as a member of "The Next Establishment" in the October Issue, 2007 and 2011. Ito was named by BusinessWeek as one of the 25 Most Influential People on the Web in 2008.

On July 22, 2011, he was awarded a Lifetime Achievement Award in recognition of his role as one of the world's leading advocates of Internet freedom from the university of Oxford Internet Institute. In 2011, with Ethan Zuckerman, he was named by Foreign Policy magazine to its list of top global thinkers, in which he stated the Best idea is "Users controlling their own data". Ito received the degree of Doctor of Literature, honoris causa, from The New School in 2013. On March 11, 2014, Ito was inducted into the SXSW Interactive Festival Hall of Fame. He was a TED speaker at the March 21, TED2014. In 2014, Ito was awarded the Golden Plate Award by the Academy of Achievement. On May 17, 2015, Ito received a Doctor of Humane Letters, honoris causa, from Tufts University. In 2016, Wired magazine listed Ito as #33 in a list of the Wired 100 people "making things happen" by shaping culture, technology economy, consumer behaviour, and scientific discovery. Ito was elected to the American Academy of Arts and Sciences in April 2017. On May 11, 2017, Ito was awarded the IRI Medal.

== Bibliography ==
- Ito, Joi; Howe, Jeff (2016). Whiplash: How to Survive Our Faster Future. Grand Central Publishing. ISBN 978-1455544592.
- Ito, Joi (2008). FREESOULS: Captured and Released. Freesouls.cc. ISBN 978-0982029121.

== See also ==
- History of the Japanese in Metro Detroit
- Free culture
- List of people named in the Epstein files
