= Ariel Ekblaw =

American astronautical engineer

Ariel C. Ekblaw
- Education: MIT Media Lab (PhD, 2020; MS, 2017); Yale University (BS, 2014)
- Scientific career
- Fields: Space architecture, space habitats
- Workplaces: MIT Media Lab; Aurelia Institute
- Thesis: Self-Aware Self-Assembly for Space Architecture: Growth Paradigms for In-Space Manufacturing (2020)
- Doctoral advisor: Joseph A. Paradiso

Ariel Caitlyn Ekblaw is an American aerospace architect and astronautical engineer who designs space architecture. She founded the Space Exploration Initiative at MIT Media Lab in 2016 and has served as its director since 2020. Ekblaw is CEO and co-founder of the space habitat-oriented firm Aurelia Institute, which started in 2021. She earned her PhD from MIT, with her doctoral thesis describing a modular, self-assembling space architecture design called TESSERAE (Tessellated Electromagnetic Space Structures for the Exploration of Reconfigurable, Adaptive Environments).

== Early life and education ==
Both of her parents were pilots with the United States Air Force. Her great-grandfather, Walter Elmer Ekblaw, was an Antarctic and Arctic explorer who served as a scientist on the 1913 Crocker Land Expedition. She was homeschooled for several years and earned a Gold Award with the Girl Scouts. She was a National Merit Scholar and attended New Fairfield High School in New Fairfield, Connecticut.

Ekblaw earned her BS cum laude from Yale University in 2014, double majoring in physics, and Mathematics and Philosophy. During her time at Yale, she co-founded Yale Women in Physics. Ekblaw was a research assistant at CERN particle physics laboratory where she wrote code for data analysis and researched supersymmetry. She was an assistant and member of the flight crew for a reduced-gravity aircraft as part of a NASA zero gravity experiment. In 2014 and 2015, she worked as a data analyst for Microsoft Azure.

Ekblaw continued her studies at MIT Media Lab, earning her MS in distributed systems in 2017. Her graduate dissertation was on a blockchain application for medical records called MedRec. She interned briefly at NASA's Jet Propulsion Laboratory and earned her PhD from MIT in space architecture in 2020. Her doctoral advisor was Joseph A. Paradiso and her thesis was "Self-Aware Self-Assembly for Space Architecture: Growth Paradigms for In-Space Manufacturing".

== Career ==
=== MIT Space Exploration Initiative ===
Ekblaw founded the MIT Media Lab's Space Exploration Initiative in May 2016. She was lead of the initiative and began serving as its director in 2020. The initiative focuses on designing technology needed for future space exploration, developing prototypes for space technology such as architecture and habitat to serve the needs of astronauts and space tourists. The initiative annually runs around 15 microgravity experiments and has sent several projects into space, including a propellant experiment launch with Blue Origin and construction material tests and plastic-eating enzymes which were sent to the International Space Station. Some of the initiative's designs were inspired by NASA'S 1975 Summer Study. The Space Exploration Initiative's AstroAnt MIT Micro rover was inspired by the 2015 Neal Stephenson novel Seveneves and has been tested in microgravity.

=== TESSERAE ===
In Ekblaw's doctoral thesis, she conceived the project TESSERAE (Tessellated Electromagnetic Space Structures for the Exploration of Reconfigurable, Adaptive Environments), a modular space architecture design using quasi-stochastic, self-assembling tiles based on the geometry of buckyballs and held together with electropermanent magnets. The tiles can be packed flat during launch and are designed to self-deploy in space. Testing for the TESSERAE design was done with miniaturized versions on two parabolic flights and a Blue Origin suborbital launch. Following a March 2020 test on SpaceX CRS-20, the design underwent a month-long test aboard the International Space Station using samples flown there with Axiom Space's Axiom Mission 1.

=== Aurelia Institute ===
Ekblaw co-founded the non-profit Aurelia Institute in September 2021 with Danielle DeLatte and Sana Sharma. She serves as CEO of the organization, which was a spinoff of the MIT Space Exploration Initiative. The institute focuses on the research and development of advanced technology for long-term space habitats, including space architecture and infrastructure for space tourists. In addition to TESSERAE technology, Ekblaw's projects have included designs for waste management and HVAC systems in space.

== Publications ==
Ekblaw wrote the 2021 book Into the Anthropocosmos: A Whole Space Catalog from the MIT Space Exploration Initiative.

- Ekblaw, A., Prosina, A., Newman, D.J., and Paradiso, J., "Space Habitat Reconfigurability: TESSERAE platform for self-aware assembly", 30th IAA Symposium On Space and Society (Space Architecture: Habitats, Habitability, and Bases). Proceedings of the IAF International Astronautical Congress, 2019.
- A Azaria, A Ekblaw, T Vieira, A Lippman, "Medrec: Using blockchain for medical data access and permission management", 2016 2nd international conference on open and big data (OBD), 25-30.
