= Harrison J. Hunt =

American surgeon and explorer

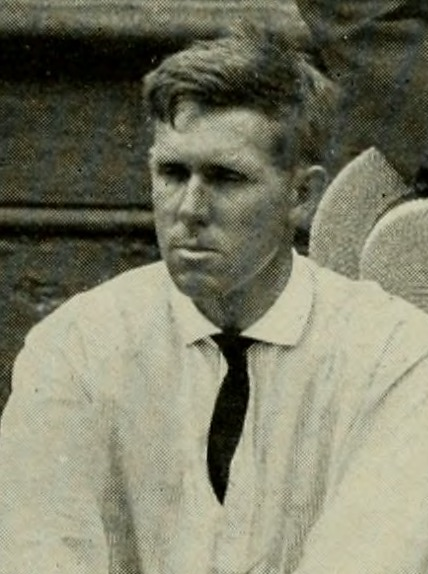
Harrison J. Hunt

Harrison J. Hunt (1878–1967) was surgeon on the Crocker Land expedition to the Arctic in 1913–1917, and the first to return to civilization with news of his fellow explorers, who had been trapped in the ice for four years. Hunt escaped after a grueling four-month dog-sled journey accompanied by six Inuit. He wrote about the experience in the book North to the Horizon: Arctic Doctor and Hunter, 1913–1917.

Born in Bangor, Maine, Hunt was a graduate of Bowdoin College and the Bowdoin Medical College. He spent his post-Arctic career working at the Eastern Maine Hospital in Bangor, and was appointed Medical Examiner of Penobscot County, Maine, in 1925.

Hunt is credited with finding the major biological specimens returned by the Crocker expedition, the eggs of the red knot, which established its migration pattern between Europe and northern Greenland.
