= Bradley Land =

Phantom island in the Arctic Ocean

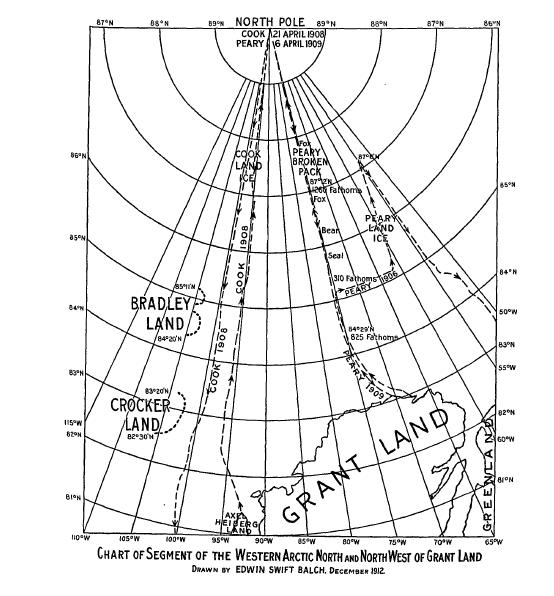
- Alleged location of Bradley Land, sighted by Frederick Cook, and Crocker Land, sighted by Robert Peary.
- Created by: First reported by Frederick Cook

In-universe information
- Type: Large phantom island
- Locations: Arctic Ocean

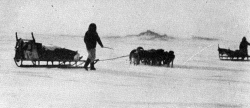
Photo of Cook's 1909 expedition, with alleged Bradley Land in background

Bradley Land was the name Frederick Cook gave to a mass of land which he claimed to have seen between (84°20′N 102°0′W) and (85°11′N 102°0′W) during a 1909 expedition. He described it as two masses of land with a break, a strait, or an indentation between. The land was named for John R. Bradley, who had sponsored Cook's expedition.

Cook published two photographs of the land and described it thus: "The lower coast resembled Heiberg Island, with mountains and high valleys. The upper coast I estimated as being about one thousand feet high, flat, and covered with a thin sheet ice."

It is now known there is no land at that location and Cook's observations were based on either a misidentification of sea ice or an outright fabrication. Cook's Inuit companions reported that the photographs were actually taken near the coast of Axel Heiberg Island.

== See also ==
- Crocker Land
- Sannikov Land
