= Maurice Cole Tanquary =

American entomologist

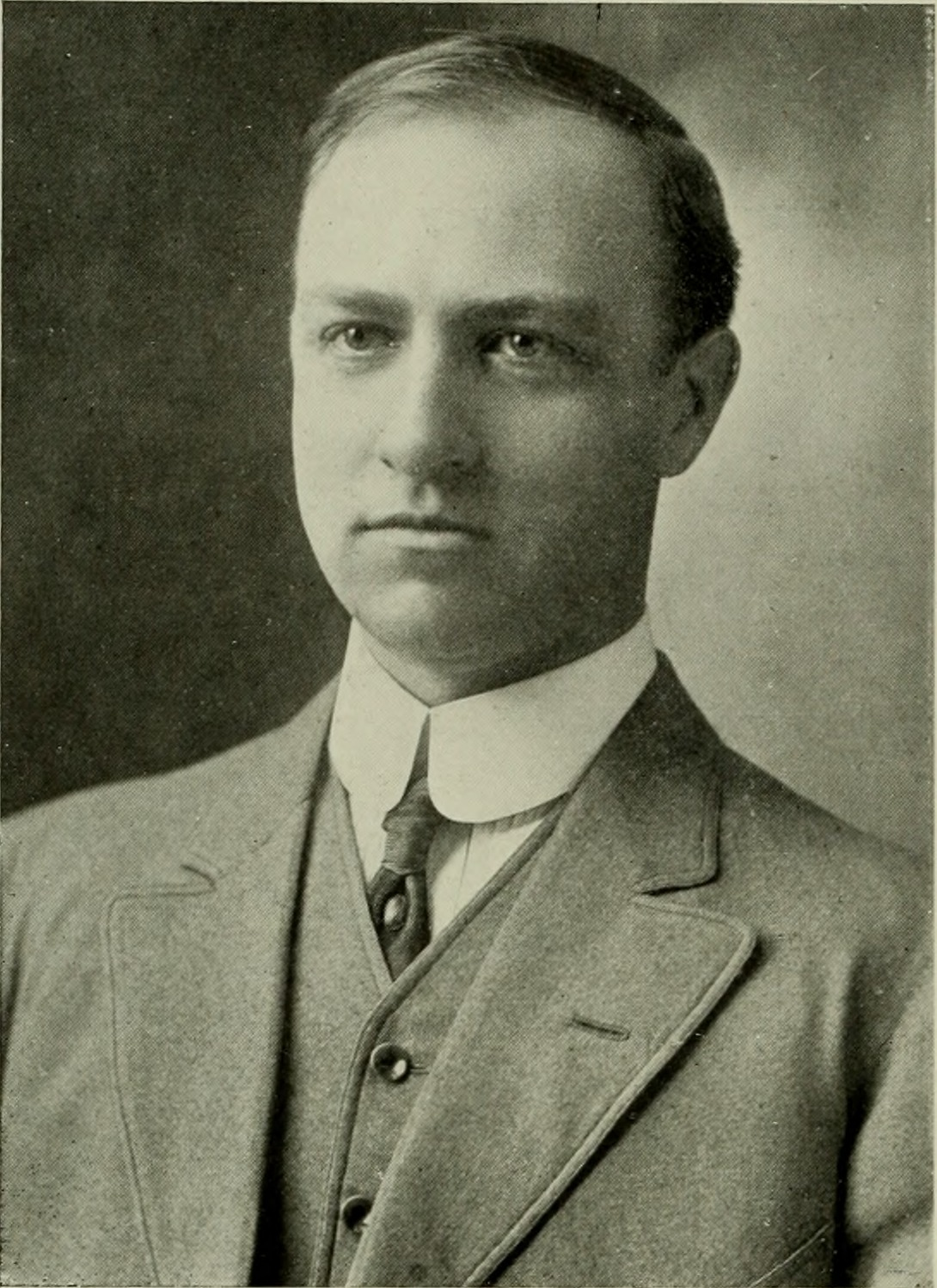
- Tanquary in 1913
- Born: November 26, 1881; Illinois
- Died: October 25, 1944 (aged 62)
- Education: A.B., M.A., PhD
- Alma mater: University of Illinois
- Known for: Crocker Land Expedition
- Spouse: Josephine Perry Tanquary
- Children: Rev. Jean Tanquary, Joyce Tanquary Presthus, and Margaret Tanquary Corwin
- Scientific career
- Fields: Entomology; Zoology; Apiculture
- Institutions: Illinois Department of Agriculture; Minnesota Department of Agriculture; Kansas State Agricultural College; Texas Department of Agriculture; University of Minnesota

Maurice Cole Tanquary (November 26, 1881 - October 25, 1944) was a professor of entomology, a member of the Crocker Land Expedition and is considered to be a pioneer in modern beekeeping.

== Early life ==
Tanquary was the son of Thomas J. and Florence A. Tanquary. He was born and raised in Lawrenceville, Illinois, grew up on a farm and attended local public schools. He furthered his education at Vincennes University, where he played an active role in the Tau Phi Delta society, contributing to its initial constitution and by-laws. In 1903, he graduated from Vincennes University and subsequently taught at Lawrence County's public schools for four years. Pursuing higher education, he sought degrees at the University of Illinois, obtaining his AB in 1907, MA in 1908, and PhD in 1912. During his time at the University of Illinois, Tanquary worked as a part-time assistant to the State Entomologist of Illinois between 1908 and 1909. He also undertook summer studies at Harvard University in 1910 and served as a field agent for the State Entomologist of Minnesota in 1911. Notably, Tanquary played an active role in campus life, founding the Ionian Literary Society and becoming a charter member of the Acacia fraternity. He served as the national treasurer of Acacia from 1908 to 1909.

After earning his doctorate he became a professor of agriculture at Kansas State Agricultural College in 1913 where he was given leave to join the Crocker Land Expedition as a zoologist later that year.

== Crocker Land Expedition ==
As the zoologist for the expedition, Tanquary was not involved in the final push to find the island from the village of Etah in northern Greenland. Instead, he and fellow Illinois alumnus Walter Elmer Ekblaw were stationed at a Danish trading post 120 miles to the south. They became stranded there after Ekblaw was struck with snow blindness and almost ran out of food in 1914. They were rescued just in time in August and returned to Etah.

In December 1914 Tanquary and Donald Baxter MacMillan set off by dogsled for southern Greenland in an attempt to send out word that Crocker Land did not exist and that they would need a rescue ship in 1915. During the trip they became lost for ten days in temperatures as low as -50F. Running low on provisions, they had to eat several of their dogs. As luck would have it, they happened upon an Eskimo settlement. MacMillan decided to return to Etah and have Tanquary complete the journey with a Danish trader and an Eskimo guide. After making it to the mail station in southern Greenland, Tanquary made the 400 mile trip back to Etah. Along the way, Tanquary removed his boots and pieces of raw, bleeding skin and flesh fell off his rotting toes. Despite the frostbite, Tanquary managed to drive his dog team to Etah, where his big toes were amputated. Ekblaw described Tanquary's dash back to Etah as "the grittiest exploit of the expedition."

Tanquary's message for help was received and a rescue ship was sent. Unfortunately, the ship became entrapped in ice and Tanquary had to make another trip to the southern tip of the island. The trip began on December 16, 1915, from Etah and ended on April 20, 1916. He was able to catch a ride on a ship going to Copenhagen, Denmark which he reached on May 20, 1916. He promptly cabled New York asking for a second relief ship to be sent to the party and he made arrangements for his return to the U.S.. The second rescue ship, sent in the summer of 1916, also became stuck in the ice and the expedition was not rescued until 1917.

Journals from Tanquary, Walter Ekblaw, Donald and Mirriam MacMillan are available online at the George J. Mitchell Department of Special Collections & Archives website. Digitization of materials at Bowdoin College related to the Crocker Land Expedition funded by the Gladys Krieble Delmas Foundation in 2016.

== Personal life ==
Tanquary married Josephine Perry of Manhattan, KS on his return from the expedition. They had a child named Jean who was born in April 1917.

== Professional life ==
He returned to Kansas State Agricultural College in 1916 as an assistant professor before becoming as associate professor in 1919. Later in 1919, he became the chief of entomology at the Texas Agricultural Experiment Station and was named Texas' state entomologist.

In 1920 he made a trip to Mexico to study the pink bollworm which infested cotton crops.

Tanquary was interested in apiculture and resigned in 1923 to enter professional beekeeping in North Dakota. He joined the University of Minnesota College of Agriculture as an entomologist in 1928 and remained there until 1944. While in Minnesota he devoted much of his time to the study of bees. He was also known as a good teacher who could apply experimental ability to practical manner.

Tanquary's family donated his photographs, lantern slides and journals to The Peary-MacMillan Arctic Museum, Bowdoin College, in 2006.

Tanquary Fiord on Ellesmere Island is named for him.
