= Fotopedia =

Former online photo encyclopedia

- Screenshot Fotopedia's landing page since the site's closure.
- Website type: Photo/Encyclopedia
- Available in: English
- Founded: October 10, 2008
- Owners: Fotonauts, Inc.
- Website: www.fotopedia.com
- Registration: optional
- Launched: June 9, 2009
- Current status: Closed
- Content license: Creative Commons or All Rights Reserved

The site's homepage while it was still operational.

Fotopedia was a photo encyclopedia that, as of August 2011, had generated more than 51,000 pages and linked to over 755,000 photos.

Fotopedia was launched in June 2009 by five former Apple employees: Jean-Marie Hullot, Bertrand Guiheneuf, Manuel Colom, Sébastien Maury and Olivier Gutknecht.

Members could create photo-driven articles which include Wikipedia and Google Maps information. They were able to add a limited number of photos per day resulting in a high quality selection of photos. The range of topics varied widely from precise locations, music bands or species to countries and famous people. As well as taking part in the encyclopedia, professional and amateur photographers on Fotopedia could create albums to display their works, use Wikipedia articles to add context and to advertise popular albums. Fotopedia also had several social networking features, such as a profile page and ability to interact with other users and content.

Fotopedia supported Creative Commons licenses, enabling photos to be reused throughout the encyclopedia. Joi Ito, CEO of Creative Commons, was a board member.

On July 31, 2014, Fotopedia announced it would be discontinued. Users had until August 10, 2014 to retrieve their data. After that, all data was deleted from the server. As a reason for the site's discontinuation, the founders listed that they believed "there [was no] suitable business in [the concept of storytelling] yet." Three days before the deadline, the Evernote Corporation announced that users could sync their existing Fotopedia material with Evernote before the shutdown, free of charge.

The Archive Team made a backup available on archive.org. However, the pictures are not directly displayed, but assembled within archive files that need to be downloaded and extracted. The software used to copy the pictures from fotopedia.com to archive.org is available on GitHub.
