= Safecast =

- Founded: 2011; 15 years ago
- Founder: Sean Bonner, Joi Ito and Pieter Franken
- Location: Dogenzaka (Shibuya, Japan)
- Method: volunteer based data collecting, open hardware development, online data network
- Key people: Sean Bonner, Joi Ito, Pieter Franken
- Volunteers: About 900 (End of 2016)
- Website: safecast.org

Safecast is an international, volunteer-centered organization supporting citizen science for environmental monitoring. Safecast was established by Sean Bonner, Pieter Franken, and Joi Ito shortly after the Fukushima Daiichi nuclear disaster in Japan, following the Tōhoku earthquake on 11 March 2011 and manages a global open data network for ionizing radiation and air quality monitoring.

The Safecast has designed various devices for radiation mapping. Haiyan Zhang developed a widely used interactive map of radiation levels around Japan, and was a mapping consultant in the formative phase of Safecast.
