= Jean-Marie Hullot =

French computer scientist and programmer (1954–2019)

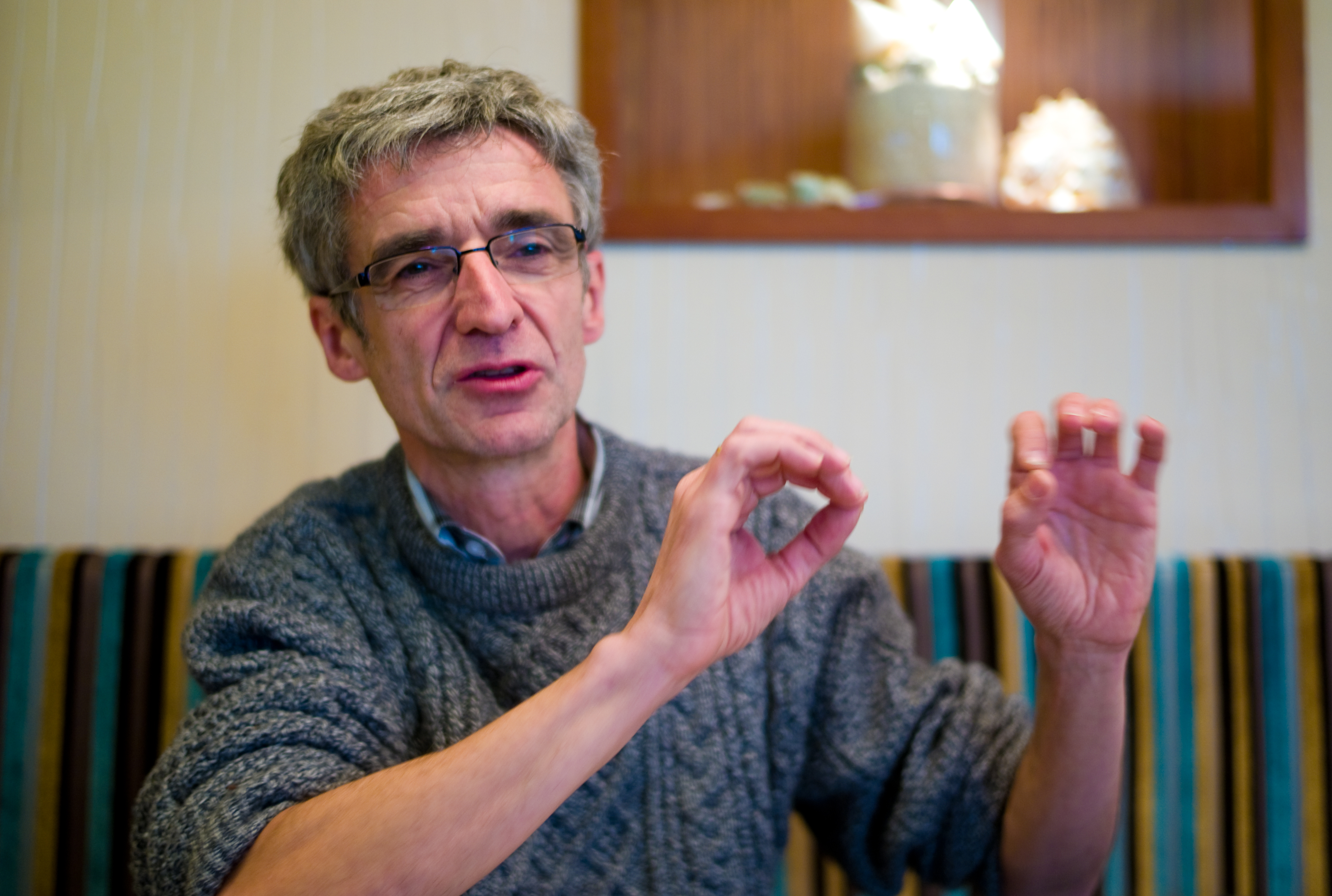
- Hullot in 2008
- Born: February 16, 1954; Paris, France
- Died: June 19, 2019 (aged 65); Paris, France
- Known for: Interface Builder, NeXTSTEP, iCal, iSync

Jean-Marie Hullot (February 16, 1954 – June 17, 2019) was a French computer scientist and programmer who authored important programs for the original Macintosh, NeXTSTEP and Mac OS X platforms. These include SOS Interface for the Mac, which later became Interface Builder for NeXTSTEP (1985), and later still evolved into an important part of Mac OS X. He also helped to conceive iPhone, though did not play a significant role in its development, and led the iCal and iSync development teams for Mac OS X (2002).

== Education ==
In 1981, Jean-Marie Hullot received a Ph.D. in computer science from the University of Paris at Orsay, where his adviser was Gérard Huet.

== Career ==
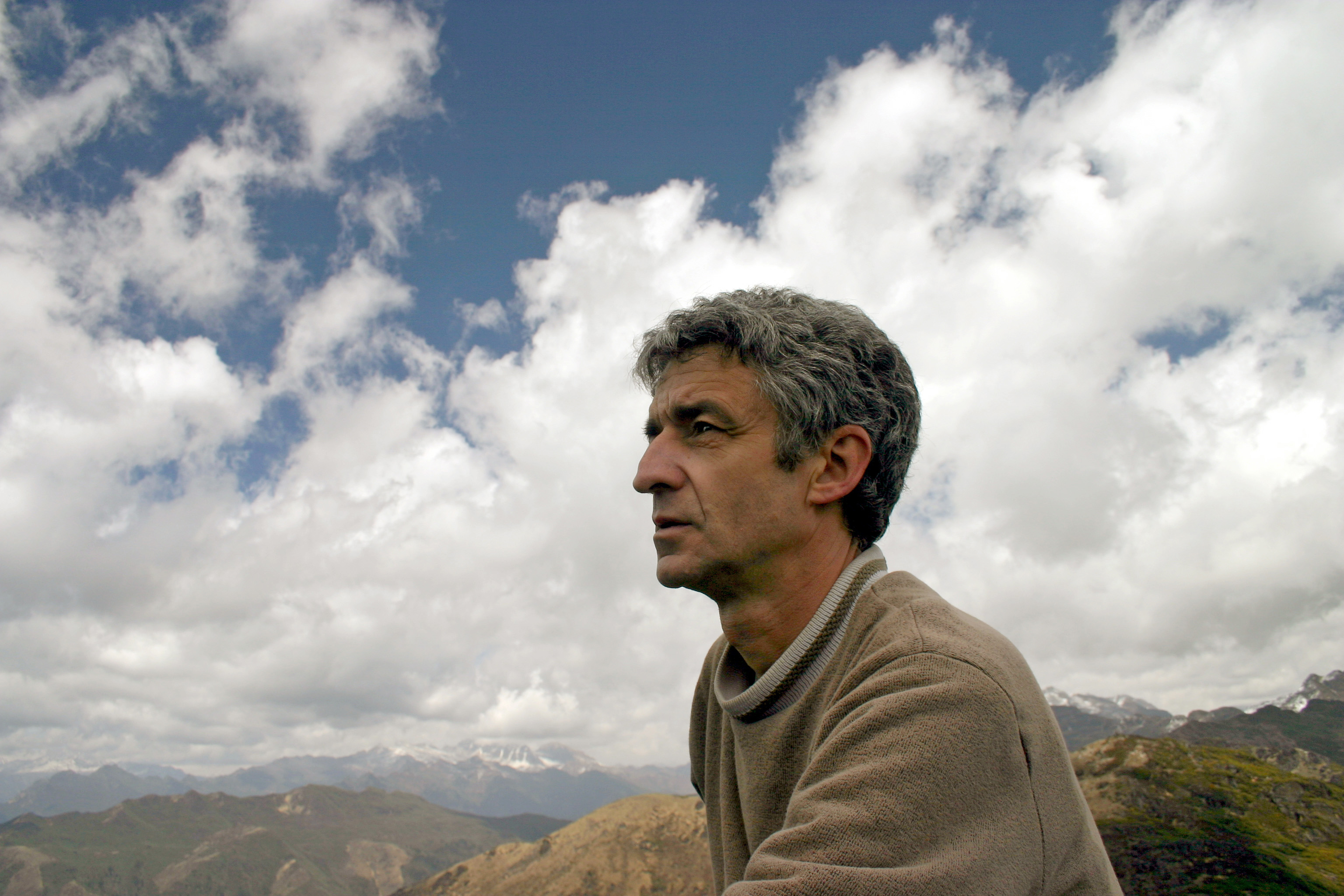
Jean-Marie Hullot

He was a researcher at INRIA from 1979 to 1985, when he joined NeXT. In 1996 he co-founded RealNames, a URL translation service which closed in 2002. He worked as CTO of the application division at Apple Inc. from 2001 to 2005. He was the president and CEO of Fotopedia, a collaborative photo encyclopedia, and co-founder of The Iris Foundation, a nature conservancy organization.

He died on June 19, 2019.
