= Haiyan Zhang =

Designer and engineer

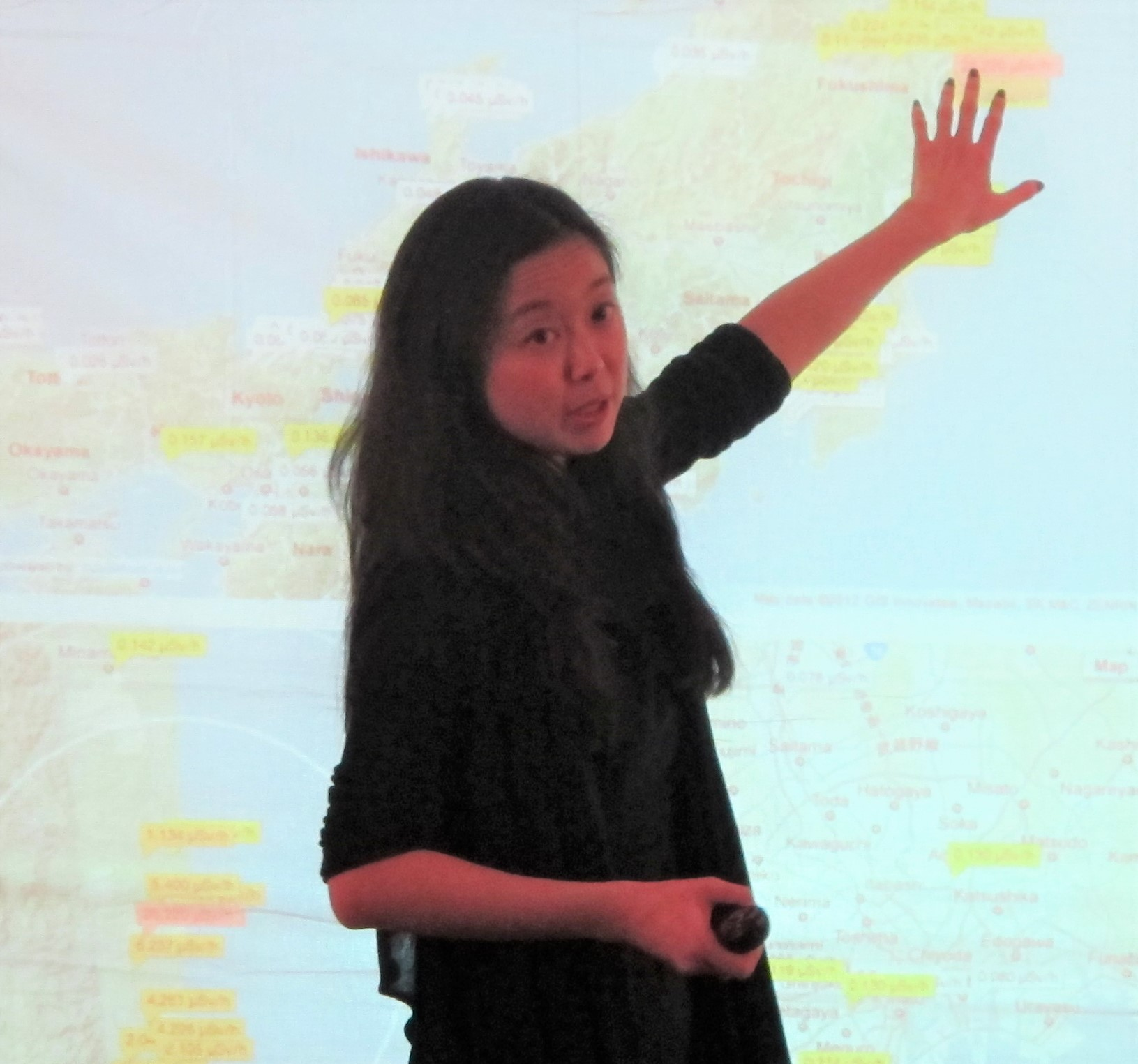
- Haiyan Zhang discusses her Japan Geigermap in 2012
- Education: Monash University; Interaction Design Institute Ivrea
- Employer: Microsoft Research
- Known for: The Emma Watch; Innovations in Technology Making

Haiyan Zhang is an Australian designer and engineer. She is Director of Innovation at Microsoft Research and Technical Advisor to Lab Director, Christopher Bishop. She appeared on the BBC show "Big Life Fix".

== Education ==
Zhang was born in China, and migrated to Australia with her parents aged eight. She attended Monash University, where she earned first-class honours for a bachelor's degree in computer science in 1998. Zhang worked for Space-Time Research until 2000, when she left Australia to further her studies in design. Zhang moved to Canada to complete a Post Graduate Diploma in Interactive Multimedia at Sheridan College, which she completed in 2003. Whilst there she helped develop a tool for visualising electroencephalography for intra-operative monitoring. She moved to Italy to study at the Interaction Design Institute Ivrea, where she completed a Masters in Interaction Design.

== Career ==
Zhang worked as an Interaction Designer for the British Design Council and Stanford University. Zhang joined IDEO as Principal Interaction Designer in 2006. Here she "created new technology experiences for community building, entertainment, financial services". with Mattel, Electronic Arts, HBO, France Telecom, Alcatel, Cisco, and AT&T. She was a founder of the innovation platform OpenIDEO, which brings together makers around the world to solve challenges for social good. The site has over 150,000 users worldwide.

She joined Microsoft in 2013, working in the Lift London studio on games and wearables. In 2015 she became Innovation Director at Microsoft Research. She is interested in technology for "Connected Play" and wellness. In 2011, Zhang developed an interactive map of radiation levels around Japan, widely used in the aftermath of the Fukushima Daiichi nuclear disaster. She was a mapping consultant for Safecast, a volunteer organisation developing geiger counters that can be built simply by non-experts, which are distributed around Fukushima.

=== Big Life Fix ===
The BBC Two show "Big Life Fix" paired technology experts with members of the public who were facing real life challenges. Zhang was one of seven makers. Zhang developed two products, the Emma Watch and Fizzyo. Fizzyo is a toy to encourage children with cystic fibrosis to do their breathing exercises to clear their lungs. It comprises a wireless electronic sensor in the mouthpiece, which sends an electronic signal to control a computer game on a tablet. The Emma Watch is a device for sufferers Parkinson's disease, which looks to reduce limb tremors by disrupting the "feedback loop between the brain and hand". Microsoft unveiled the device at their annual developer's conference. It was named after Emma Lawton, a graphic designer who Zhang met on the show. The invention received significant media coverage.

Zhang regularly delivers public talks and appears on podcasts, where she discusses design and engineering. She is an advocate for increasing the representation of women in technology. She is a Fellow of the Royal Society of the Arts (FRSA) and British Academy of Film and Television Arts (BAFTA).
