= Crocker Land Expedition =

Research expedition

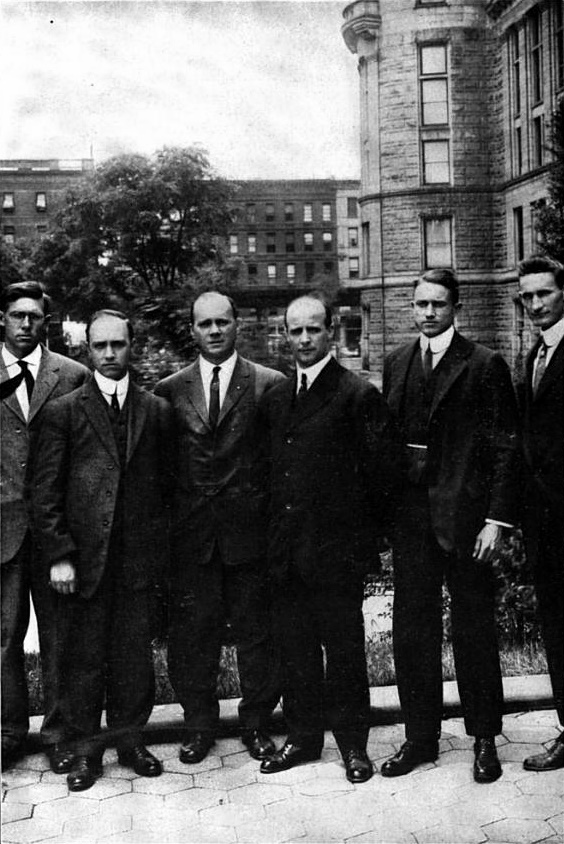
Expedition members. From left to right: Harrison J. Hunt, Maurice C. Tanquary, W. Elmer Ekblaw, Donald B. MacMillan, Fitzhugh Green, and J. L. Allen.

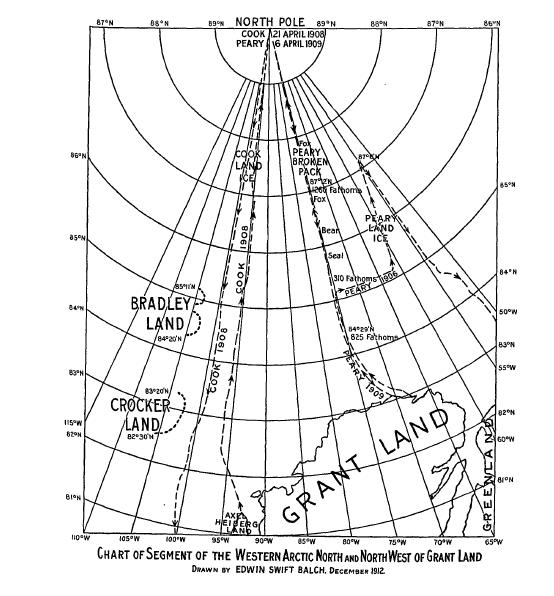
Alleged locations of Crocker Land, sighted by Robert Peary, and Bradley Land, sighted by Frederick Cook.

The Crocker Land Expedition took place in 1913. Its purpose was to investigate the existence of Crocker Land, a huge island supposedly sighted by the explorer Robert Peary from the top of Cape Colgate in 1906. It is now believed that Peary fraudulently invented the island.

== Background ==
Following his 1906 expedition that failed to reach the North Pole, Robert E. Peary reported in his book that he had sighted distant land from the heights of the northwestern shore of Ellesmere Island. He named it Crocker Land, after San Francisco banker George Crocker, one of his financial backers. It is now known that Peary's claim was fraudulent, as he wrote in his diary at the time that no land was visible. The invention of Crocker Land was apparently an attempt to secure further support from Crocker for Peary's 1909 expedition. If so, the attempt failed, as Crocker had diverted all of his available resources to the rebuilding of San Francisco following the 1906 earthquake.

The existence or non-existence of Crocker Land became important following the controversial events of the autumn of 1909, when both Peary and Frederick Cook returned to civilization, claiming to have reached the North Pole. Since Cook claimed to have traversed the alleged region of Crocker Land and found no such land, the existence of Crocker Land would be proof of the falsity of Cook's claim. Backers of Peary's claim therefore set out to find it.

The expedition was organized by Donald Baxter MacMillan and George Borup, and sponsored by the American Museum of Natural History, the American Geographical Society and the University of Illinois' Museum of Natural History. After Borup's death in 1912, MacMillan took sole control over the expedition.

MacMillan's geologist, ornithologist and botanist was Walter Elmer Ekblaw of the University of Illinois. Navy Ensign Fitzhugh Green served as engineer and physicist. Maurice Cole Tanquary, of the University of Illinois, was the zoologist, and Harrison J. Hunt the surgeon.

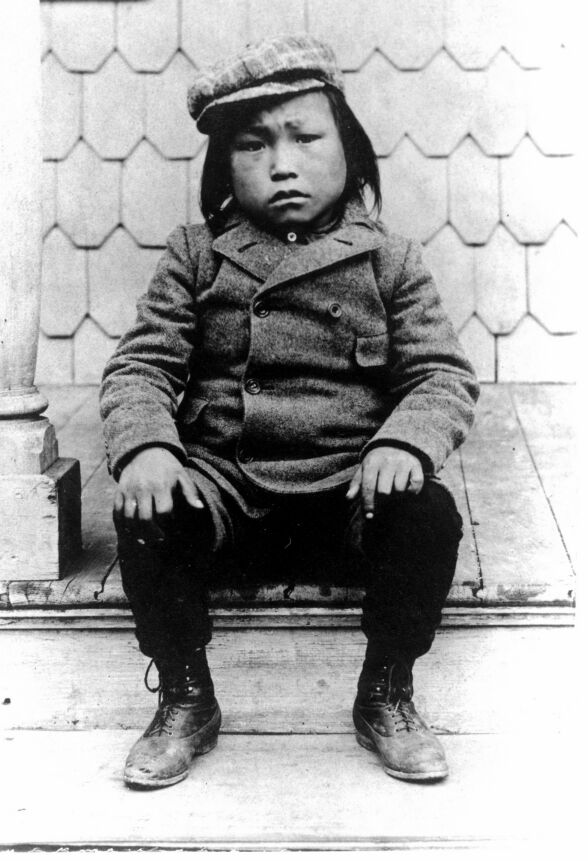
Minik Wallace as a child

Minik Wallace, the Inuk brought to the United States as a child by Robert Peary in 1897, was the guide and translator for the expedition.

As well as confirming and mapping the position of Crocker Land, the declared purpose of the expedition was to investigate "geology, geography, glaciology, meteorology, terrestrial magnetism, electrical phenomena, seismology, zoology (both vertebrate and invertebrate), botany, oceanography, ethnology, and archaeology".

In newspapers of the time, MacMillan described Crocker Land as "the world’s last geographical problem".

In June 1906, Commander Peary, from the summit of Cape Thomas Hubbard, at about latitude 83 degrees N, longitude 100 degrees W, reported seeing land glimmering in the northwest, approximately 130 miles [210 km] away across the Polar Sea. He did not go there, but he gave it a name in honor of the late George Crocker of the Peary Arctic Club. That is Crocker Land. Its boundaries and extent can only be guessed at, but I am certain that strange animals will be found there, and I hope to discover a new race of men.

== The expedition ==
The expedition left Brooklyn Navy Yard aboard the steamer Diana on 2 July 1913. Two weeks later, at midnight on 16 July, the Diana struck rocks while trying to avoid an iceberg. MacMillan blamed the collision on the captain, who was drunk at the time. The expedition transferred to another ship, the Erik, and eventually arrived at Etah, in north-west Greenland, on the second week of August.

The next three weeks were spent constructing a large eight-room shed, with electricity generation capabilities, that was to serve as the local headquarters of the expedition. An attempt was also made to set up a radio room, but it was not successful, and the expedition was never able to establish reliable radio communications with the outside world.

After making a number of preliminary trips to place supply caches along the route, MacMillan, Green, Ekblaw and seven Inuit set off on the 1,200-mile (1,900 km) journey to Crocker Land on 11 March 1914. The temperature was many degrees below zero and weather conditions were very poor.

Eventually, the party reached the 4,700-foot-high (1,400 m) Beitstadt Glacier, which took them three days to climb. The temperature dropped dramatically and Ekblaw suffered severe frostbite. He was evacuated back to Etah by some of the Inuit.

One by one, the other members of the party gave up and turned back. By the time the expedition reached the edge of the Arctic Ocean on 11 April, only MacMillan, Green and two Inuit, Piugaattoq and Ittukusuk, remained. The four dog sleds set off across the treacherous sea ice, avoiding thin patches and expanses of open water, and eventually, on 21 April, the party saw what appeared to be a huge island on the north-western horizon. As MacMillan later said, "Hills, valleys, snow-capped peaks extending through at least one hundred and twenty degrees of the horizon.”

Piugaattoq, an Inuk hunter with 20 years of experience of the area, explained that it was just an illusion. He called it poo-jok, which means 'mist'. However, MacMillan insisted they press on, even though it was late in the season and the sea ice was breaking up. For five days they went on, following the mirage. Finally, on 27 April, after they had covered some 125 miles (201 km) of dangerous sea ice, MacMillan was forced to admit that Piugaattoq was right—the land that they had sighted was in fact a mirage. (It was probably a rare form of mirage called a Fata Morgana.)

Later MacMillan wrote:

The day was exceptionally clear, not a cloud or trace of mist; if land could be seen, now was our time. Yes, there it was! It could even be seen without a glass, extending from southwest true to north-northeast. Our powerful glasses, however, brought out more clearly the dark background in contrast with the white, the whole resembling hills, valleys and snow-capped peaks to such a degree that, had we not been out on the frozen sea for 150 miles, we would have staked our lives upon its reality. Our judgment then, as now, is that this was a mirage or loom of the sea ice.

— from Four Years in the White North

The party turned around and was able to reach solid land—with no time to spare, for the sea ice broke up the next day.

== The killing of Piugaattoq ==
After returning to land, MacMillan sent Piugaattoq and Green to explore a route to the west. The weather turned against them and they were forced to take shelter in a snow cave. One of the dog teams died in the snow, and during a squabble over which direction to travel next, Green took a rifle from the sled and shot Piugaattoq in the back, killing him.

On 4 May Green rejoined MacMillan and told him what had happened. Upon their return to Etah, MacMillan informed the other American members of the expedition, but asked them to keep quiet. He told the Inuit that Piugaattoq had died in an avalanche. Ekblaw said later that this was "one of the darkest and most deplorable tragedies in the annals of Arctic exploration."

Green was never prosecuted for the murder, although the Inuit suspected there was more to the story than had been told and that Green had had a relationship with Piugaattoq's wife Aleqasina (Alakahsingwah), a striking beauty. She had previously been Peary's mistress, and had borne him two children.

== The return home ==
The expedition attempted to head for home, but the weather turned against them and they were stranded in the region for the next four months.

In December 1914, MacMillan and Tanquary set off for Etah with the intention of sending a message to the outside world that a rescue was needed the following summer. They quickly ran into trouble with the weather, and MacMillan turned back. Tanquary pressed on and eventually reached Etah in mid-March 1915.

Word reached the American Museum of Natural History. That summer, the George B. Cluett, a three-masted schooner completely unsuitable for Arctic waters, was sent, captained by George Comer. The vessel never reached the expedition. It ended up trapped in ice and did not return for two years.

In 1916, a second relief ship was sent, and ran into similar problems. By this time, Tanquary, Green and Allen had made their own way back to the United States by dog sled.

The rest of the expedition was eventually rescued in 1917 by the ship Neptune, commanded by Captain Robert Bartlett.

== Aftermath ==
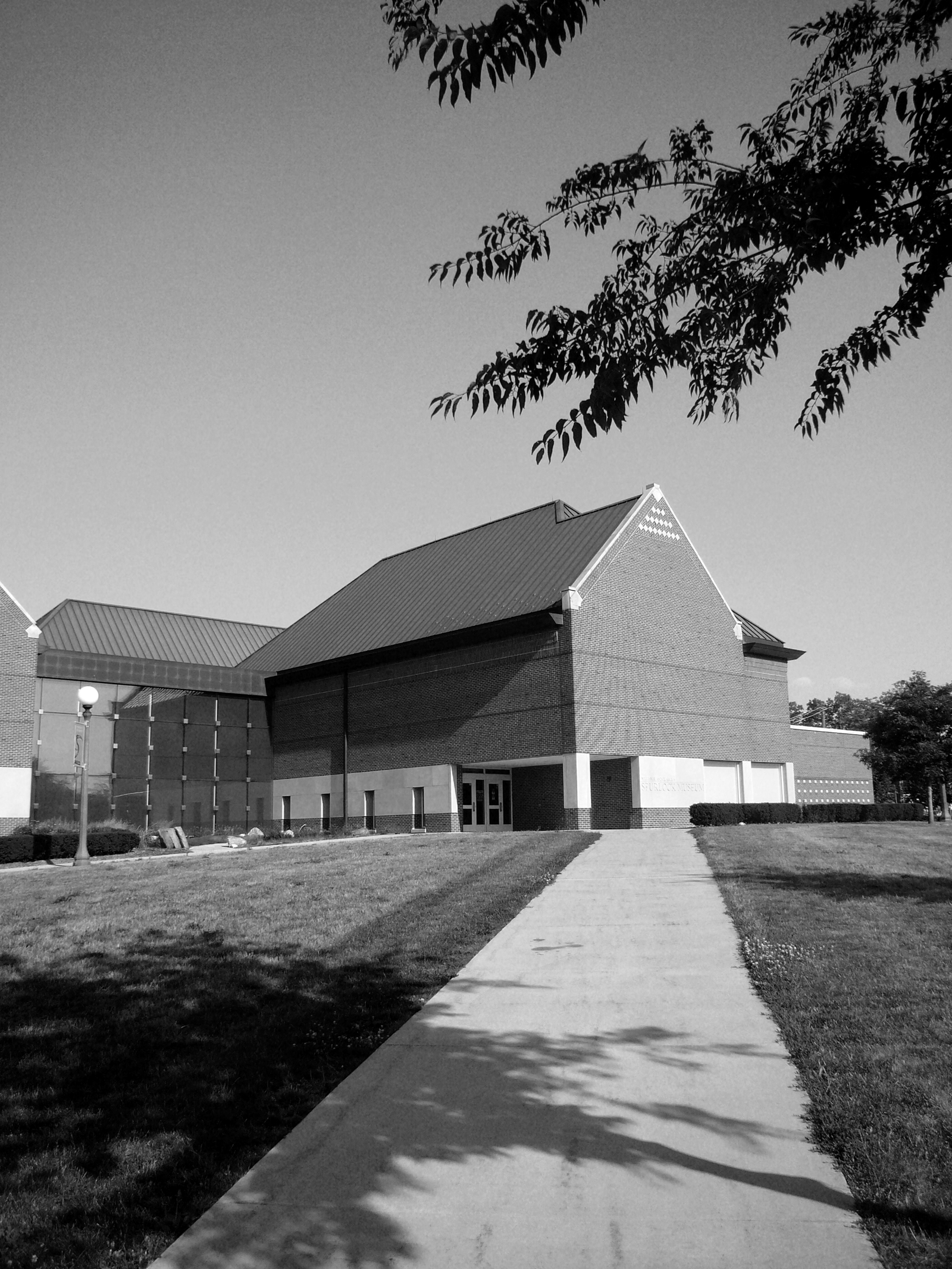
Spurlock Museum

Although the expedition failed to map the non-existent Crocker Land, much important research was done. A considerable number of photographs and artifacts were brought back, documenting the indigenous peoples and natural habitat of the region.

Hundreds of photos of the expedition and over 200 artifacts are displayed in the University of Illinois' Spurlock Museum. There is also a permanent exhibit at the Peary–MacMillan Arctic Museum on the grounds of Bowdoin College in Brunswick, Maine. Journals from Tanquary, Ekblaw and Donald MacMillan and his wife Miriam are available online at the George J. Mitchell Department of Special Collections & Archives website. Digitization of materials at Bowdoin College related to the Crocker Land Expedition was funded by the Gladys Krieble Delmas Foundation in November 2015.

== See also ==
- Sannikov Land
- Bradley Land
