= Joseph A. Paradiso =

American academic and scientist

Joseph Paradiso
- Citizenship: United States
- Spouse: Married (confidential)
- Scientific career
- Fields: Media Arts and Sciences
- Workplaces: MIT Media Lab
- Doctoral advisor: Prof. Ulrich Becker

Joseph Paradiso is the Alexander W. Dreyfoos (1954) Professor at MIT's Program in Media Arts and Sciences. He directs the MIT Media Lab's Responsive Environments Group, which explores how sensor networks augment and mediate human experience, interaction and perception. He received a B.S. in electrical engineering and physics summa cum laude from Tufts University, and a Ph.D. in physics from MIT with Prof. Ulrich Becker in the Nobel Prize-winning group headed by Prof. Samuel C.C. Ting at the MIT Laboratory for Nuclear Science.

Paradiso's research focuses include ubiquitous computing, embedded systems, sensor networks, wearable and body area networks, energy harvesting and power management for embedded sensors, and interactive media.

He also designed and built one of the world's largest modular synthesizers, and has designed MIDI systems for the musicians Pat Metheny and Lyle Mays. The synthesizer currently streams live-generated audio over the internet.
