= Walter Ekblaw =

American geologist, ornithologist and botanist

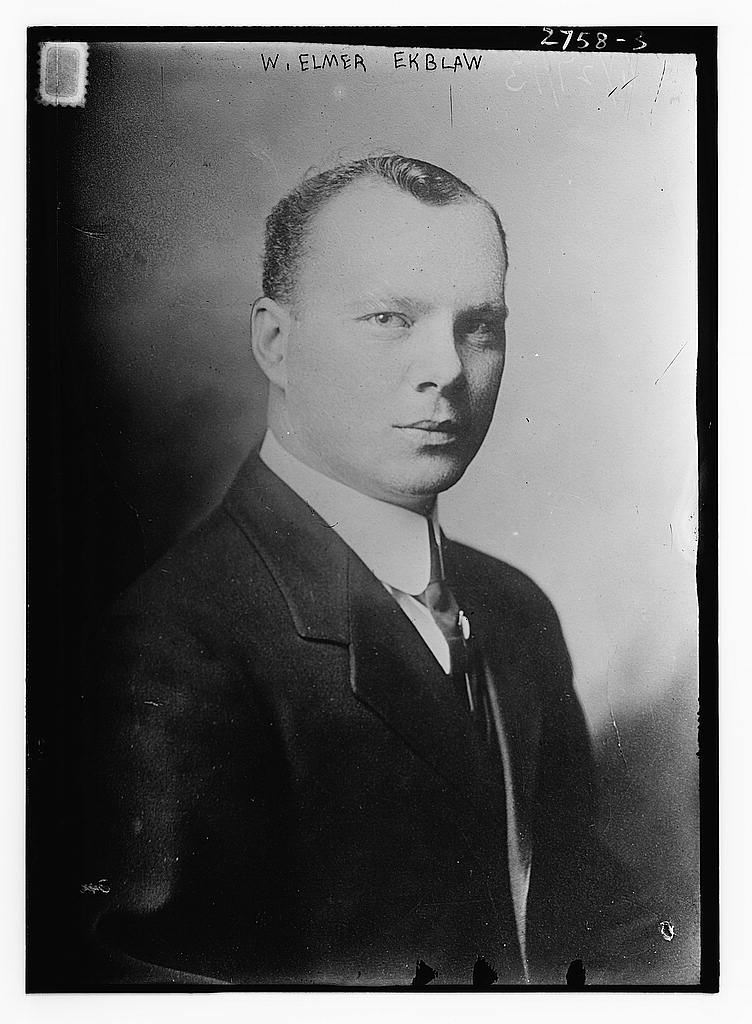
- Walter Elmer Ekblaw circa 1913.
- Born: Walter Elmer Ekblaw; March 10, 1882; Champaign County, Illinois, U.S.
- Died: June 7, 1949 (aged 67)
- Burial place: Glen Cemetery, Paxton, Illinois; 40.45°N 88.0911°W
- Education: University of Illinois (at Urbana-Champaign)
- Occupations: Professor, editor, geologist, botanist, ornithologist
- Known for: Co-founding the University of Illinois homecoming, member of the Crocker Land Expedition
- Spouse(s): Augusta May Krieger (1918), Ellen L. Lindblad (1933)
- Children: 3
- Parents: Andrew Ekblaw (father); Ingrid Johnson (mother)

Walter Elmer Ekblaw (March 10, 1882 – June 7, 1949) was an American college professor who served as geologist, ornithologist and botanist on the Crocker Land Expedition (1913-1917).

== Life and career ==
Walter Elmer Ekblaw was born in Champaign County, Illinois. He was one of six children born to Andrew Ekblaw (1854-1923) and Ingrid (Johnson) Ekblaw (1860-1942) both of whom were Swedish immigrants. He graduated from the University of Illinois with a B.A. in 1910. At the university, he was editor of the Daily Illini (1910). Together with fellow senior, Clarence Foss Williams (1886-1971), he organized the first University of Illinois homecoming on October 15, 1910. He taught at the University of Illinois from 1910 to 1913.

He subsequently became a research associate with the American Museum of Natural History. He attended Clark University where he received a Ph.D. in 1926. He served as a professor of geography at Clark University from 1924 to 1949. In 1947, he received the Order of the Polar Star from King Gustav V of Sweden for his work in promoting good relations between Sweden and the United States. He died in 1949, aged 67, and was buried at the Glen Cemetery in Ford County, Illinois.

== Crocker Land Expedition ==
From 1913 to 1917, he served as geologist and botanist of the Crocker Land Expedition together with Maurice Cole Tanquary of the University of Illinois who served as the zoologist. The Crocker Land Expedition, which explored northern Greenland, was organized by Arctic explorers Donald Baxter MacMillan. The expedition was sponsored by the American Museum of Natural History, the American Geographical Society, and the University of Illinois' Museum of Natural History. Members of the ill-fated expedition, including Ekblaw, were rescued by the ship Neptune, commanded by Robert Bartlett in 1917. On his return to the United States, Ekblaw wrote a number of papers including The importance of nivation as an erosive factor and of soil flow as a transporting agency in northern Greenland (Proceedings of the National Academy of Sciences, Vol. 4, 1918, p. 288-93), and also one on The food birds of the Smith Sound Eskimos (Wilson Bulletin, Vol. 31 (o.s.), Vol. 26 (n.s.), No. 106, 1919, pp. 1-5). Later publications dealt with The ecological relations of the polar Eskimo (Ecology, Vol. 2, 1921, pp. 132-44) and Eskimo dogs forgotten heroes (Natural History, Vol. 37,1936, pp. 173-84). Mount Ekblaw was named for him.

Journals from Maurice Tanquary, Ekblaw, Donald and Mirriam MacMillan are available online at the George J. Mitchell Department of Special Collections & Archives website. Digitization of materials at Bowdoin College related to the Crocker Land Expedition funded by the Gladys Krieble Delmas Foundation in 2016.

== Selected works ==
- Correlation of the Devonian System of the Rock Island Region (1912)
- Stratigraphy and Paleontology of the Devonian System in Rock Island County, Illinois (1912)
- Along Unknown Shores: Narratives of Exploration in the Far North (1918)

== Other sources ==
- Crocker Land Expedition to the north polar regions(American Museum of Natural History and the American Geographical Society, University of Illinois)

== Related reading ==
- Hunt, Harrison J. and Ruth Hunt Thompson (1980) North to the Horizon: Searching for Peary's Crocker Land (Down East Publishing) ISBN 978-0892720804
- Horwood, Harold (2010) Bartlett: The Great Explorer (Doubleday Canada) ISBN 978-0385674355
