= Island Command Greenland =

Island Command Greenland Grønlands Kommando
- Coat of Arms of the Danish Island Command Greenland
- Active: 1946 (established); 1946 (activated)
- Disbanded: October 2012
- Size: 150 civilian & military

Commanders
- Rear Admiral: Henrik Kudsk (2008)

HDMS Hvidbjørnen (F360) is a Thetis-class ocean patrol vessel belonging to the Royal Danish Navy.

Island Command Greenland (Danish: Grønlands Kommando), or simply "GLK", was a Level II authority responsible directly to the Defence Command. It was, among other things, responsible for the military defense of Greenland, maritime and sovereignty maintenance and enforcement, as well as search and rescue. Personnel assigned to the Danish liaison office at Thule Air Base (FOTAB) as well as the Sirius Patrol (Danish: Slædepatruljen SIRIUS) were also a part of the Greenland Command. Island Command Greenland was amalgamated with Island Command Faroes to a Joint Arctic Command on 31 October 2012.

It also functioned as NATO's Island Commander Greenland, formerly part of Allied Command Atlantic. ACLANT became Allied Command Transformation in 2003, and since then it was not clear exactly how the command now fits into the NATO Military Command Structure.

== History ==
The Danish military can trace its activities in Greenland back to the time of Hans Egede. From the late 18th century up to World War II, personnel from the Danish military contributed very actively to the exploration of Greenland, by land, sea and air.

After the Second World War fishing inspections and sea measuring began again and the first dedicated Greenland command was established, called the "Greenland Maritime Command", located at Nuuk (Danish: Godthåb). On August 1, 1951, it changed name to the "Island Command Greenland", while simultaneously moving from Nuuk to the Naval base at Kangilinnguit (Danish: Grønnedal, at that time it was only a Marine station), where it has been ever since.

== Civilian duties ==
Under the stipulations of several international treaties, Denmark has agreed to keep and maintain a SAR (Search And Rescue) response organization in the Greenlandic area of responsibility. This organization was administered by the Greenland Command. The organization was divided into three sections, Land, Maritime, and Air, in order to simplify the command structure, which is absolutely vital on SAR operations.

The Greenland Command is authorized to request additional support from naval vessels, police cutters, the Royal Danish Air Force, civilian ships, aircraft from Air Greenland, and US or Icelandic SAR units based in Iceland if need be.

Currently there are about 150 total civilian and military employees employed by the command, from both Danish and Greenlandic descent.

== Commanders ==
No.	Portrait	Name (born-died)	Term of office			Ref.
No.	Portrait	Name (born-died)	Took office	Left office	Time in office	Ref.
1		(act.) Counter Admiral; Frits Hammer Kjølsen (1893–1985)	1 August 1951	9 August 1955	4 years, 8 days	
2		(act.) Counter Admiral; Hans Børge Larsen (1898–1971)	1 October 1955	15 October 1957	2 years, 14 days	
3		(act.) Counter Admiral; Johannes H. J. Jegstrup (1899–1981)	15 October 1957	15 February 1959	1 year, 123 days	
4		(act.) Counter Admiral; Axel Schmidt (1900–1966)	15 February 1959	1 April 1962	3 years, 45 days	
5		(act.) Counter Admiral; Jørgen Münter (1904–1977)	1 April 1962	1 April 1965	3 years, 0 days	
6		(act.) Counter Admiral; Hans-Henrik O. Wesche (1914–1977)	1 August 1965	1 April 1968	2 years, 244 days	
7		(act.) Counter Admiral; Eigil Christian Franch Petersen (1918–?)	1 April 1968	31 Maj 1973	5 years, 60 days	
8		(act.) Counter Admiral; Henning Leonard Prause (1918–?)	1 June 1973	15 June 1977	4 years, 14 days	
9		(act.) Counter Admiral; Hans Erik Hansen (1922–?)	15 June 1977	19 September 1979	2 years, 96 days	
10		(act.) Counter Admiral; Jørgen Bendix Pranov (1924–2010)	19 September 1979	31 March 1983	3 years, 182 days	
11		(act.) Counter Admiral; Poul Erik Pedersen (1924–?)	1 April 1983	30 November 1986	3 years, 243 days	
12		(act.) Counter Admiral; Wilhelm Lauge Grentzmann (1930–?)	1 December 1986	31 August 1991	4 years, 273 days	
13		(act.) Counter Admiral; Poul Birger Nielsen (1937–?)	1 September 1991	28 February 1994	2 years, 180 days	
14		(act.) Counter Admiral; Niels Helk (1936–?)	1 March 1994	30 June 1996	2 years, 121 days	
15		(act.) Counter Admiral; Erik Fage-Pedersen (1940–?)	1 July 1996	30 September 1997	1 year, 91 days	
16		(act.) Counter Admiral; Steen Vestergaard Andersen (born 1943)	1 October 1997	31 August 1999	1 year, 334 days	
17		(act.) Counter Admiral; Axel Fiedler (born 1944)	1 September 1999	30 April 2001	1 year, 241 days	
18		(act.) Counter Admiral; Knud Erik Kristiansen (1943–?)	1 May 2001	28 July 2003	2 years, 88 days	
19		(act.) Counter Admiral; Uffe Haagen Olsen (1945–?)	29 July 2003	31 December 2005	2 years, 155 days	
20		(act.) Counter Admiral; Niels Erik Sørensen (born 1950)	1 January 2006	31 July 2007	1 year, 211 days	
21		(act.) Counter Admiral; Henrik Bunde Kudsk (born 1953)	1 August 2007	31 October 2012	5 years, 91 days	

== Winter in Grønnedal ==
- Grønlands Kommando - official Greenland Command site (Danish)
- DPC - For researchers - Logistics - Grønnedal - Danish Polar Centre (English)

== See also ==
- Arctic Command
- Danish Realm
- Danish Navy
- Defence Command
- Danish Defence
- Greenland
- Faroe Islands
- Denmark
