= Outer Kitsissut =

Island group in Greenland

Kitsissut Avalliit Ydre Kitsissut Torstein Islands
- Location within Greenland

Geography
- Location: Labrador Sea; Southern Greenland
- Coordinates: 60°45′N 48°24′W
- Major islands: Thorstein
- Highest elevation: 116 m (381 ft)

Administration
- Greenland
- Municipality: Kujalleq

Demographics
- Population: 0

Outer Kitsissut (Greenlandic: Kitsissut Avalliit; Danish: Ydre Kitsissut, old spelling Ydre Kitsigsut), also known as Thorstein Islands or Torstein Islands, is an island group in the Kujalleq municipality in southern Greenland. Outer Kitsissut is an important ecological area, primarily for its position as a breeding ground for seabirds, and is classified as a Ramsar site. Closest major settlements include Arsuk, Qassimiut and Qaqortoq.

== Geography ==
Outer Kitsissut is located 9.5 kilometres (6 miles) to the west-north-west of Cape Desolation 5 km from the shore. It is a compact cluster of small islets and rocks, with a length of 10 km and a width of 5 km. The highest and largest islet is Thorstein Island in the centre of the group, having a maximum length of about 0.7 km with a maximum height of 116 m.

The Inner Kitsissut group lies 4 km to the northeast of the northern end of the cluster at the mouth of the Coppermine Bay.

== Ecology ==
The Kitsissut archipelago is known as the only breeding reserve for birds of southern Greenland. As of 1992, major breeding species include the northern fulmar (Fulmarus glacialis), razorbill (Alca torda), black-legged kittiwake (Rissa tridactyla), and Atlantic puffin (Fratercula arctica), together with various Larus, Uria and Somateria species. However, significant decline has been reported from several birds in the 1992 report based on previous reports of the 70s, largely due to a prolonged cold climate during the 1991/92 winter, including habitat disturbances from egg harvesting. A preliminary study from 2009 till 2011 reported further significant population decline from egg harvesting, although some species with more inaccessible nests are less prone to decline.

== See also ==
- List of islands of Greenland
