= Cape Thorvaldsen =

Peninsula in Kujalleq, Greenland

Cape Thorvaldsen Kap Thorvaldsen
- Cape
- Location within Greenland
- Coordinates: 60°40′N 47°55′W
- Location: Kujalleq, Greenland
- Water bodies: Labrador Sea

Area
  - Total: Arctic

Cape Thorvaldsen (Danish: Kap Thorvaldsen) is a headland in southwest Greenland in the Kujalleq municipality.

== Geography ==
The cape is located southeast of Cape Desolation near the settlements of Qaqortoq and Narsaq Kujalleq (Frederiksdal). The Outer Kitsissut (Torstein Islands) lie 26 km west-north-west of the cape.
