= Bluie West Seven =

U.S. naval base in Greenland, 1940–1951

Coordinates: 61.175°N 48.447°W

Bluie West 7 or Grondal was a major U.S. naval operating facility (naval base) near Ivittuut in Arsuk Fjord, Greenland. In some form, it was in operation from 1940 to 1951, although its formal establishment by the United States Navy was on 1 April 1943. After 1942, the proper name was Kangilinnguit (Danish), or Green Valley (English), but the base was also called Grondal ("groan dale") by Americans. Bluie was the military code name for Greenland. It was 3 mi (4.8 km) east of the Ivittuut cryolite mine. The base was later handed over to Denmark and became the Kangilinnguit (Grønnedal) naval base. The Arsuk Fjord approach is accessible by sea year-round, though with occasional ice-breaking assistance, and is known as an exceptionally scenic area.

== Founding ==
During the initial period of U.S. humanitarian aid to Greenland (1940), the cryolite mine at Ivigtut was identified as the only sensitive military target in need of protection. In addition, the Cryolite Company informed the U.S. that its workers were unreliable and might be a greater security risk than a German raider. To address an urgent Greenlandic request and to forestall similar British/Canadian plans while simultaneously avoiding the appearance of American intervention, a minimal force of 15 U.S. servicemen were given discharges and then hired by the Cryolite Company. For their use, in June 1940 the U.S. sold to the Greenland government an armaments package including one 3" naval gun and 55 rifles with ammunition. However, as early as November 1940 the State Department mentioned to the colonial governors the eventual need for a naval station in the vicinity. Plans were drawn up by the Navy Department over the winter, awaiting renewed American shipping access in March 1941.

In spring 1941, after the Hull-Kauffmann agreement allowed U.S. militarization of Greenland, a proper naval base was sought nearby. At first, the mine village was itself used, as it had the best port facilities in Greenland. It was supplemented by a protected anchorage at Kungnat Bay ten miles west, near Arsuk village. By May 1942, the Army took over protection of the mine, while the Navy operated in temporary quarters pending move to a nearby location. This site was known as Grønnedal from the green foliage there. In April 1942, United States Coast Guard vessels began surveying the site for a tank farm and other buildings. By February, the Navy decided to expand to an Advanced Operating Facility with an initial complement of 64 men, and the base was inaugurated on 1 April 1943. Major construction continued in 1943, and Grondal, known then as Navy 26, became an important naval support base.

== Operation ==
During the war, BW-7 was the main node of an extensive naval infrastructure in the area. From the coast, ships would enter Arsuk Fjord at the Kajartalik (island) lighthouse, operational in June 1942. They would pass close abeam (or visit) the small Eskimo village of Arsuk on the left, then enter Kungnat Bay where a number of vessels were usually anchored in the lee of Mt. Kungnait 4,600 ft (1,400 m). Ships could then proceed through a narrow channel (large ships favoring a wider southern strait) and past a coastal artillery post to Ivigtut Mine, or go on to Grondal. On the opposite side of the fjord were several support buildings for communications and area defense, including a coastal artillery site at a fort (locally known as Christianshavn). Arsuk Glacier formed the head of the fjord.

Amphibian aircraft slips were available at Kungnat Bay and Grondal, and several other protected places were usable for seaplanes; however, the nearest air base was at BW-1 (Narsarsuaq) about 100 miles east-south-east. An airfield for land planes at closer Kipisako (BW-2) in Coppermine Bay was surveyed and mapped, but not constructed.

The naval facility's purpose was to provide refueling and minor repairs, as well as to support convoy escort, coastal patrol, marine surveying, and construction in the area. It generally served smaller Coast Guard vessels, which operated in Greenland under Navy command, as well as requisitioned freighters carrying the essential cryolite cargo. In addition, Coast Guard PBY Catalina aircraft regularly operated from the ramp. A 1945 Navy report listed Grondal as having a camp for 16 officers and 130 enlisted men, a radio station and visual signal post, a 580-foot crib pier, two cruiser-type moorings, a 105,000 barrel tank farm, a 250-pontoon drydock, 2,000 sq. ft. of ammunition storage, an emergency seaplane facility and numerous repair and maintenance buildings. Despite this, BW-7 was far eclipsed by the Navy's larger Greenland Patrol Headquarters established adjacent to the Army's Greenland Base Command at BW-1 (Narsarssuak).

The mine village itself had a pier and minor port facilities. The population there was about 100–150 Danish workers in addition to the mine guards and the later Army post. Greenland natives were not allowed in Ivigtut, but Americans freely encountered them at Arsuk next to Kungnat Bay.

In 1945, the U.S. State Department listed the extent of the Ivigtut Defense Area as two-fold: 6112N to 6115N and 4805W to 4811W, as well as 6113N to 6114N and 4815W to 4818W.

== Legacy ==
Grondal operated under U.S. Navy command until the replacement Greenland Base Treaty of 1951 stipulated its transfer to the Danish government at the same time as a new U.S. Defense Area was established at Thule. From that time Grønnedal, now called Kangilinnguit, was the headquarters of Danish Forces in Greenland. In 2012, the base was closed and residual military functions moved to Nuuk, the capital of Greenland. In 2016, the Chinese mining company General Nice Group offered to buy the base, but the Danish government rejected the offer due to security concerns. In 2017, the station became staffed again by three Danish soldiers.

== Sources consulted ==
- U.S. Navy in World War II. Samuel Eliot Morison.
- Chronology of the U.S. Navy in World War II.
- Foreign Relations of the United States, section Denmark, Volume 1945.
- U.S. Coast Guard Archives, NARA 2, College Park, MD.
- ComGrePat War Diary, Navy 26, 1943–45.
- Building the Navy's bases in World War II. A History of the Bureau of Yards and Docks and the Civil Engineer Corps. U.S. Govt. Printint Office, 1947.
