= Arctic Coast Guard Forum =

International organisation

The Arctic Coast Guard Forum (ACGF) is an organisation which unites the coast guards of eight Arctic states: Canada, Denmark, Finland, Iceland, Norway, Russia, Sweden, and the United States. The ACGF's main task is "to foster safe, secure, and environmentally responsible maritime activity in the Arctic." Since its establishment in 2015, the ACGF has been enabling the coast guards from each member state to cooperate towards common objectives. The establishment of the ACGF is a response to the increasing levels of activities in the maritime domain in the Arctic, and with that associated need for coast guard services.

The Arctic Coast Guard Forum (ACGF)
Established	30 October 2015
Member States	Canada Denmark Finland Iceland Norway Russia Sweden United States
Website	https://www.arcticcoastguardforum.com/

== History ==
As mentioned above, the level of maritime activity in the Arctic has been on the rise. Based on Andreas Østhagen, this trend is apparent in the number of vessels, which has been rising for the past 30 years. Only in the period from 2013 to 2019, there was an increase of 25 percent in how many ships crossed the border of the Arctic Polar Code Area. In the Arctic, an increase can be observed in multiple maritime areas, such as fisheries, transport of goods, as well as cruise ships. This tendency, along with "an increased complexity of the maritime activities undertaken," put some pressure on coast guards, whose services such as "[s]earch and rescue (SAR), environmental protection (such as oil spill response) and aid to navigation" were much needed.

Prior to establishing the ACGF, the eight states had already committed to cooperate in two agreements – in a 2011 agreement related to search and rescue operations, and in a 2013 agreement on preparedness for oil spills. However, coast guard cooperation needed to be advanced even further for the coast guards to meet the requirements of the new environment. As a result, the ACGF was established on 30 October 2015. The establishment of the ACGF was inspired by the Atlantic and North Pacific Coast Guard Forums, which had already been in place. Despite the similarities that exist between the ACGF and the Arctic Council, the ACGF is an independent organisation.

== Goals ==
The ACGF's goals can be divided into several areas. The overarching goals is cooperation. This encompasses cooperation between coast guards in the Arctic on a variety of maritime issues, but also cooperation between the ACGF and the Arctic Council. An example of cooperation is information sharing.

The ACGF aims to foster cooperation on different areas related to the maritime domain. These include maritime environment, scientific research, safety on sea and responding to emergencies, local population, and Indigenous peoples. Next to cooperation, another goal which can unite the diverse focus of the ACGF is the interest in sustainable development in the Arctic maritime domain.

== Members ==
Eight Arctic states are members of the ACGF, and they are identical to those of the Arctic Council. The members are Canada, Denmark, Finland, Iceland, Norway, Russian Federation, Sweden, and the United States. Some basic information about each member state is outlined in the table below.

Member state	Name of participating agency	Headquarters
Canada	Canadian Coast Guard	Ottawa
Denmark	Joint Arctic Command	Nuuk
Finland	Finnish Border Guard	Helsinki
Iceland	Icelandic Coast Guard	Reykjavik
Norway	Norwegian Coast Guard	Sortland, Vesteraalen and Northern Norway
Russian Federation	Russian Coast Guard of the Federal Security Service	Moscow
Sweden	Swedish Coast Guard	Karlskrona
United States	U.S. Coast Guard	Washington D.C.

(Self-made, with data from The Arctic Coast Guard Forum, "Member states," accessed May 27, 2022, https://www.arcticcoastguardforum.com/.)

== Formal Structure ==
The ACGF is divided into three main bodies: the ACGF Chair, the Secretariat, and the working groups. The chairmanship rotates among the eight member states every two years, and the chair country is identical to that of the Arctic Council (see Table). The chair country is responsible for the arrangement of meetings of the ACGF, which take place twice a year.

Member state	Period of chairmanship
Russian Federation	2021-2023
Iceland	2019-2021
Finland	2017-2019
United States	2015-2017

(Self-made, with data from The Arctic Council, "Past Chairmanships," accessed May 28, 2022, https://www.arctic-council.org/about/previous-chairmanships/.)

== Past Exercises ==
Since its establishment, the focus of the ACGF has been on search and rescue operations. Search and rescue capabilities are important in the environment of the Arctic along with the increasing levels of activity, as described in the "History" section. The emphasis on search and rescue operations is also apparent in the exercises the ACGF has so far organised. Besides the exercises described in this section, the ACGF has also conducted a simulator exercise in Finland in 2018.

=== The Arctic Guardian 2017 ===
The Arctic Guardian constitutes the first operative exercise of the ACGF. It took place between 5–9 September in Iceland with the aim to scrutinise the ability of the search and rescue units to work together as well as the communication between Maritime Rescue Command Centres. The scenario included a cruise ship in distress. The directly participating countries were Canada, Denmark, Iceland, Norway, and the United States. The exercise was observed by the three remaining member states, namely Finland, Sweden, and Russian Federation.

=== Polaris 2019 ===
Like the Arctic Guardian, Polaris was a coast guard exercise, but in addition to search and rescue, it also focused on the preparations for mass rescue operations, rescuing nearly three hundred cruise ship passengers as part of this exercise. A part of this exercise was also for example training in situations on sea that include fire. Just like in the previous live exercise, communication was also trained here. Polaris took place on 2 April 2019 in Finland, and this time, all the eight member states participated in the exercise.

=== Other planned exercises ===
After the Arctic Guardian in 2017 and Polaris in 2019, another exercise was planned for the Icelandic chairmanship and was supposed to take place in 2021. However, it is most likely that this exercise was not executed based on the lack of information on the ACGF's website.

== The ACGF as an informal organisation ==
On the ACGF's website, one of the adjectives used to describe the organisation is that it is informal. The informality aspect of the organisation corresponds to a wider pattern in international politics, also outside the maritime domain. Christian Bueger argues that there has been a tendency to turn to "informal governance mechanisms" to deal with current issues on the world stage. An organisation can be categorised as informal when it does not have "explicit rules, standardized procedures and . . . standing secretariats." The ACGF does not state any rules that need to be followed by the organisation or the member state, and in its statement of cooperation, it is written that the ACGF is not based on a treaty. Besides its regular meetings, which however were affected by the COVID-19 pandemic, and the chairmanship structure adopted from the Arctic Council, the ACGF does not seem to follow any standardised procedures. Finally, the ACGF has a secretariat, but there is no mention of the secretariat being permanent with a fixed location. Therefore, not only does the ACGF self-identify as informal, but it also corresponds to the defining features of informality in organisations outlined by Bueger.

Informality of organisations is linked to the need to be innovative. This corresponds to the coast guard cooperation in the form of the ACGF, which is a way to deal with the new challenges in an innovative way in the Arctic context. However, outside of the Arctic, similar structures had already been in place prior to the establishment of the ACGF, namely the North Atlantic Coast Guard Forum established in 2007 and the North Pacific Coast Guard Forum established in 2000. The innovativeness of the ACGF should therefore be understood more narrowly as applying only to the Arctic. A benefit of informal organisations can be a greater flexibility and ability to adjust to changes than in formal organisations. This means that the ACGF can better respond to the current needs in the Arctic maritime domain. The ACGF's effort to be prepared for the tasks that are likely to be in demand in the Arctic is apparent from their live exercises The Arctic Guardian 2017 and Polaris 2019 described above, as they covered search and rescue operations of cruise ships.

== Limits to coast guard cooperation ==
The Arctic is often referred to as an example of an area where cooperation of states with Russia is possible. An explanation for the Arctic cooperation is that controversial areas are often avoided. For example, the Arctic Council promotes cooperation between Arctic states in areas related to the environment, indigenous peoples, research and similar, but military issues are explicitly not part of the agenda. Since coast guards do not deal with defense but rather with "soft security" issues, one could argue that this should have a positive impact in terms of enabling coast guards to cooperate. However, Østhagen still outlines some areas which make coast guard cooperation challenging.

=== Upholding state sovereignty ===
Coast guard cooperation is limited by issues that fall under the agenda of coast guards that relate to state sovereignty. To explain, each state has the interest in protecting its sovereignty. Therefore, many of the areas of coastguards’ activity, "such as fisheries inspections or border patrol," would be problematic to cooperate on. This means that it is not likely that such tasks would become a part of the agenda of the ACGF, and it thus constitutes a limit to the cooperation.

=== Lack of similarity of the agenda and formal organisation of the different coast guards ===
The second limitation addressed by Østhagen is that each participating state in the ACGF focuses on slightly different capabilities based on the need, which is closely affected by the state's location. Furthermore, some coast guards are a purely civilian agency, while others fall under the navy, which means that their tasks may also differ. For these reasons, cooperation can be difficult.

=== Arctic and geography ===
Finally, there is the limitation of the Arctic environment, in terms of the geography. The distances between individual Arctic states are vast, which impedes the cooperation.

== Internal tensions in the Kingdom of Denmark - Greenland as a possible future member of the ACGF? ==
As evident from the list of member states, one of the member states of the ACGF is Denmark. Like in the case of the Arctic Council, Denmark can participate in these Arctic-focused organisations thanks to Greenland being a part of the Kingdom of Denmark. With an increasing international interest in the Arctic and changing environmental conditions that allow for more opportunities in the Arctic, certain tensions arise between Greenlandic hopes for independence and Denmark's strategic interest in participating in the discussions on the Arctic with the other world players.

These internal tensions in the Kingdom could impact the ACGF as well. To explain, Denmark is represented in the ACGF by the Joint Arctic Command, which belongs to the Danish Defence. Looking at the history, Greenland's first step towards greater autonomy dates to 1979, when the referendum about the Home Rule took place. The result of the Home Rule was the establishment of a "legislative and executive authorities in Greenland," like the Greenlandic parliament. However, Denmark kept control of the domains that would be, from a realist perspective, considered as the most significant, the foreign and the security domain.

In 2008, Greenland held a second referendum, a referendum on self-government, because of which more areas were moved from Danish authority to a Greenlandic one. However, foreign affairs and defense remained in the hands of Denmark. Therefore, Greenland does not have its own army nor a coast guard. Nevertheless, there are signs from Greenlandic politicians of a hope that this might change, especially in the case of the coast guard, which is why the internal struggles are relevant in relation to the ACGF.

Greenlandic hopes for their own coast guard are apparent from an interview with the Greenlandic foreign minister Pele Broberg for a Greenlandic newspaper Sermitsiaq. In the interview, Broberg expressed an interest in having a coast guard for Greenland. In the Danish system, the navy is responsible for the tasks typically performed by coastguards. What Broberg wishes for is the establishment of a new civilian authority that would take over these duties in Greenland. Even though there is no indication of such a change taking place within the upcoming years, it is still relevant for the work of the ACGF as it could influence the membership in the organisation.
