= Alanngorsuaq Fjord =

Fjord in Kujalleq municipality, Greenland

- Coppermine Bay
- Kobberminebugt (Danish)
- Location in Greenland
- Location: Arctic
- Coordinates: 60°55′N 48°15′W
- Ocean/sea sources: Labrador Sea
- Basin countries: Greenland

Alanngorsuaq Fjord, also known as Coppermine Bay (Danish: Kobberminebugt), is a fjord in the Kujalleq municipality in southern Greenland. At the mouth of the fjord the coastline of southwestern Greenland turns to the east towards Qaqortoq.

== Geography ==
Alanngorsuaq Fjord opens towards the west a few miles north of Cape Desolation. The Inner Kitsissut islands lie on the southern side of the mouth of the bay.

The fjord is 40 km (24.9 mi) long, with an east-north-east − west-south-west orientation, opening into the Labrador Sea. There are several oblong, uninhabited islands in the inner part of the fjord, its mouth widening into a 17 km (10.6 mi) bay at the confluence with the Labrador Sea at approximately 60°53′30″N 48°19′30″W.

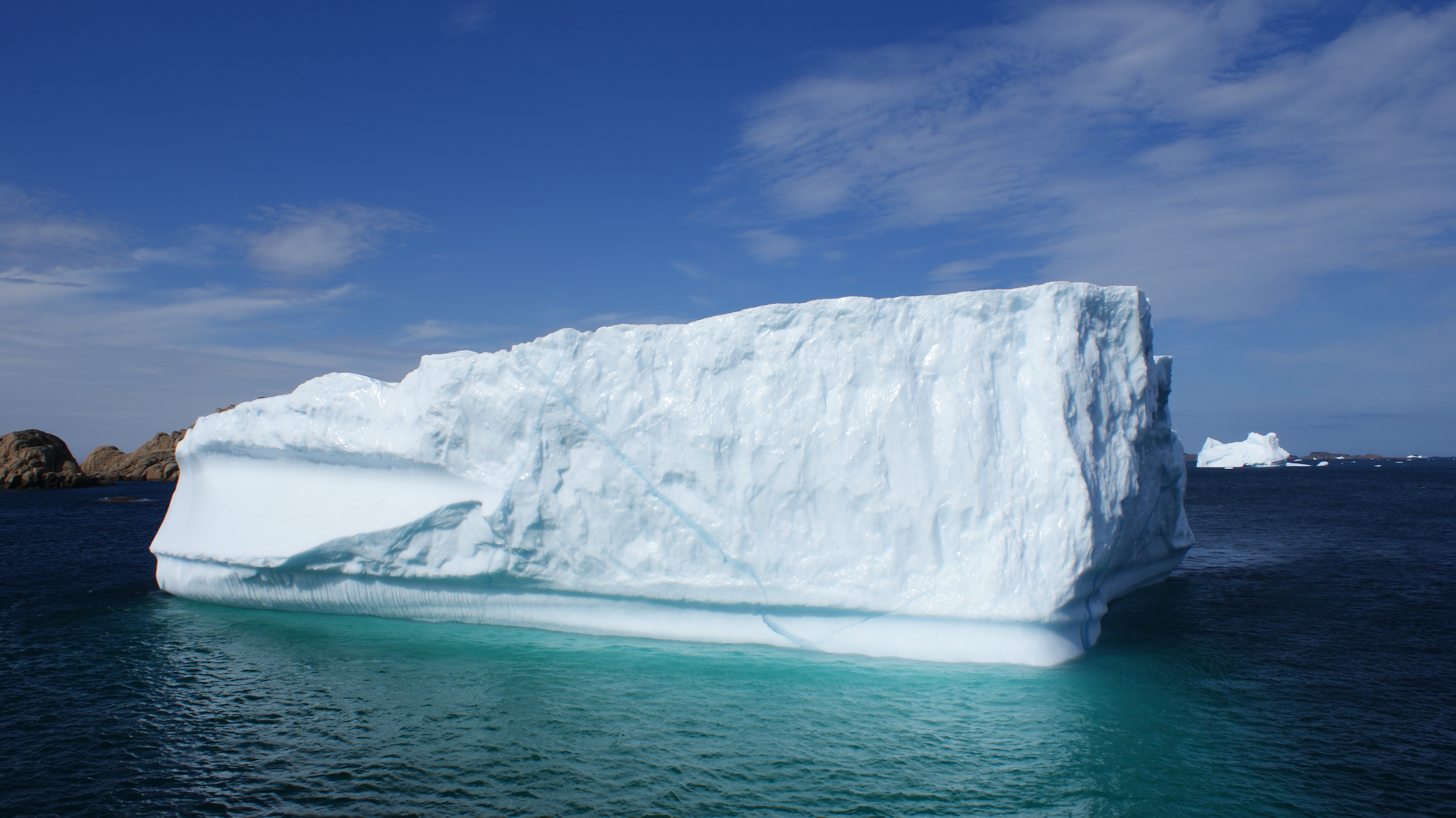
An iceberg floating at the mouth of the fjord; southern end

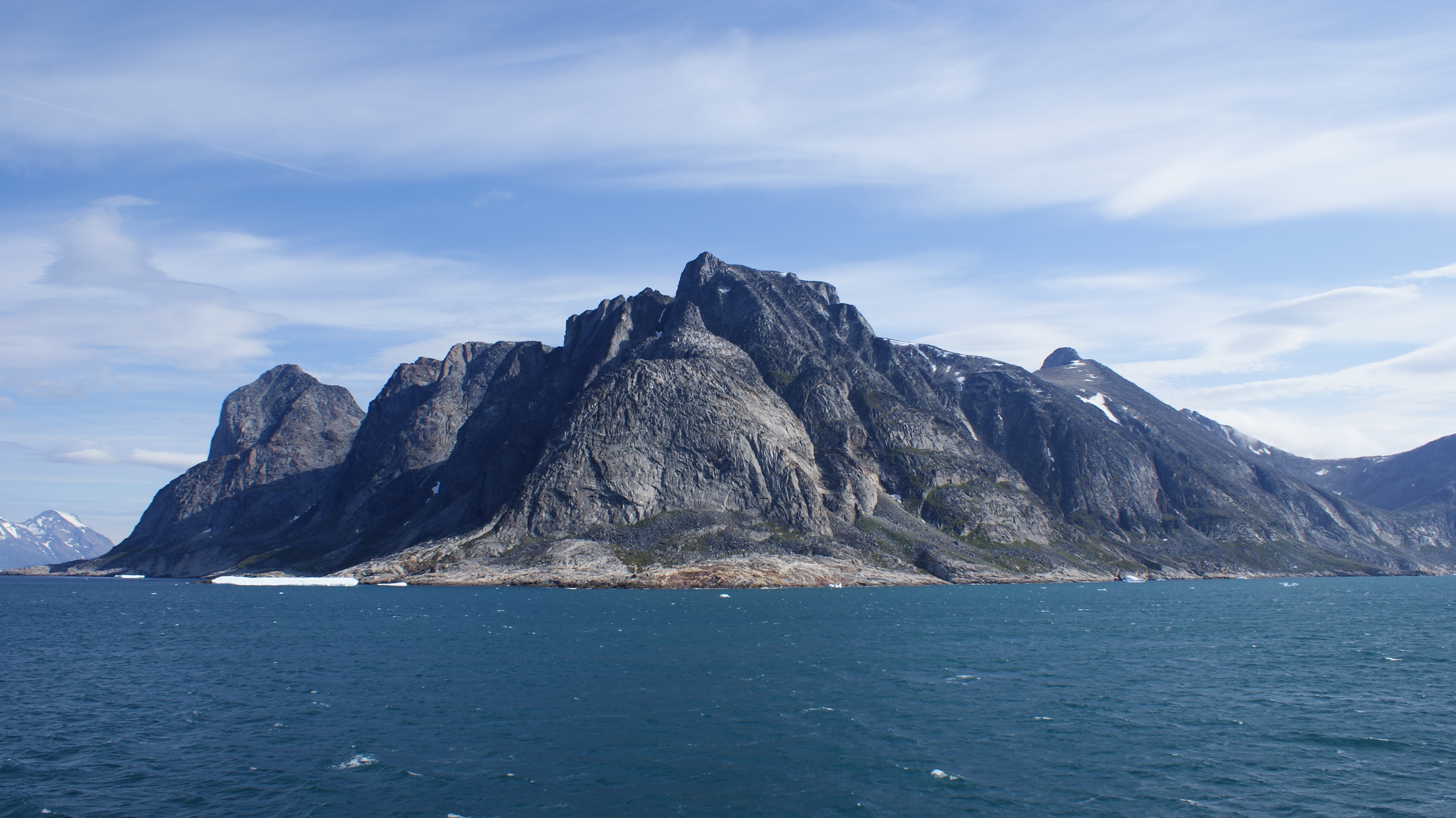
The mouth of Alanngorsuaq Fjord; northern end

== Settlement ==
The shores of the fjord are uninhabited. Arsuk is the closest settlement, located just beyond the border with the Sermersooq municipality, approximately 30 km (18.6 mi) to the north of the fjord mouth.

The fjord marked the southern limit of the former Frederikshåb District, now Paamiut. It was named 'Coppermine Bay' after a pioneer mining operation in Southwestern Greenland at the beginning of the 20th century.

== See also ==
- Bluie West Seven
- List of fjords of Greenland
