= Pingarssuit Mountain =

Mountain in Greenland

Coordinates: 76.402°N 68.727°W

Pingarssuit Mountain (P-Mountain, colloq.) is a Greenland landform near Pituffik Space Base and which has a United States Space Force military installation.

== History ==
During the Cold War, Thule Site N-32 on P-Mountain had a US Army Air Defense Command Post for Project Nike to control the 4 missile sites in the area (the USAF also had a radar at the site for control of aircraft traffic in the area.) A late 1960s satellite communications terminal was moved from the Thule P-Mountain site to Thule Site J in 1983.
