= Pituffik Space Base =

US space base in Greenland

- Near Qaanaaq, Avannaata in Greenland
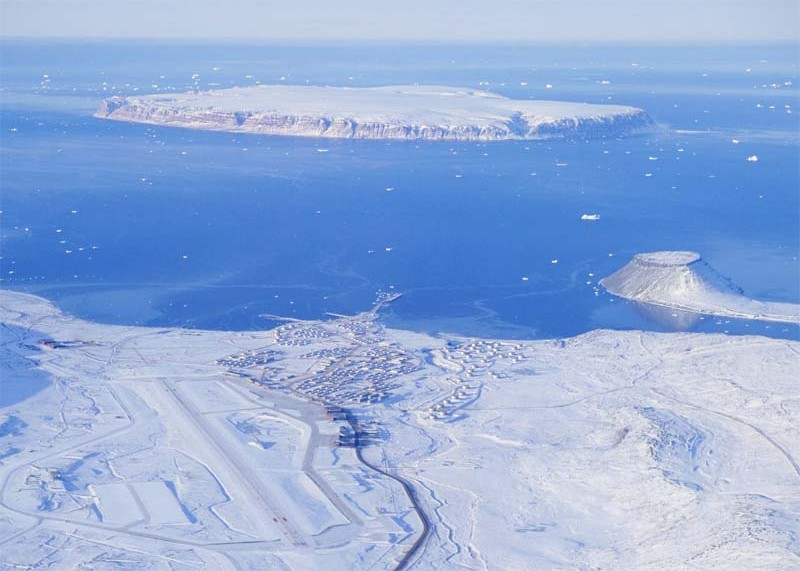
- Aerial view of the base with Saunders Island in the background and Mount Dundas at right

- Shield of Space Base Delta 1

Site information
- Type: Military base
- Operator: United States Space Force
- Controlled by: Space Base Delta 1
- Condition: Operational

Location
- Location in Greenland Location in the Arctic Circle
- Coordinates: 76°31′52″N 68°42′11″W

Site history
- Built: 1943
- In use: 1943–present
- Events: B-52 crash (1968)

Garrison information
- Current commander: Colonel Shawn Lee
- Garrison: 821st Space Base Group

Airfield information
- Identifiers: IATA: THU, ICAO: BGTL, WMO: 042020
- Elevation: 76.5 meters (251 ft) AMSL
Runways
| Direction | Length and surface |
|---|---|
| 08T/26T | 3,047 meters (9,997 ft) Asphalt |

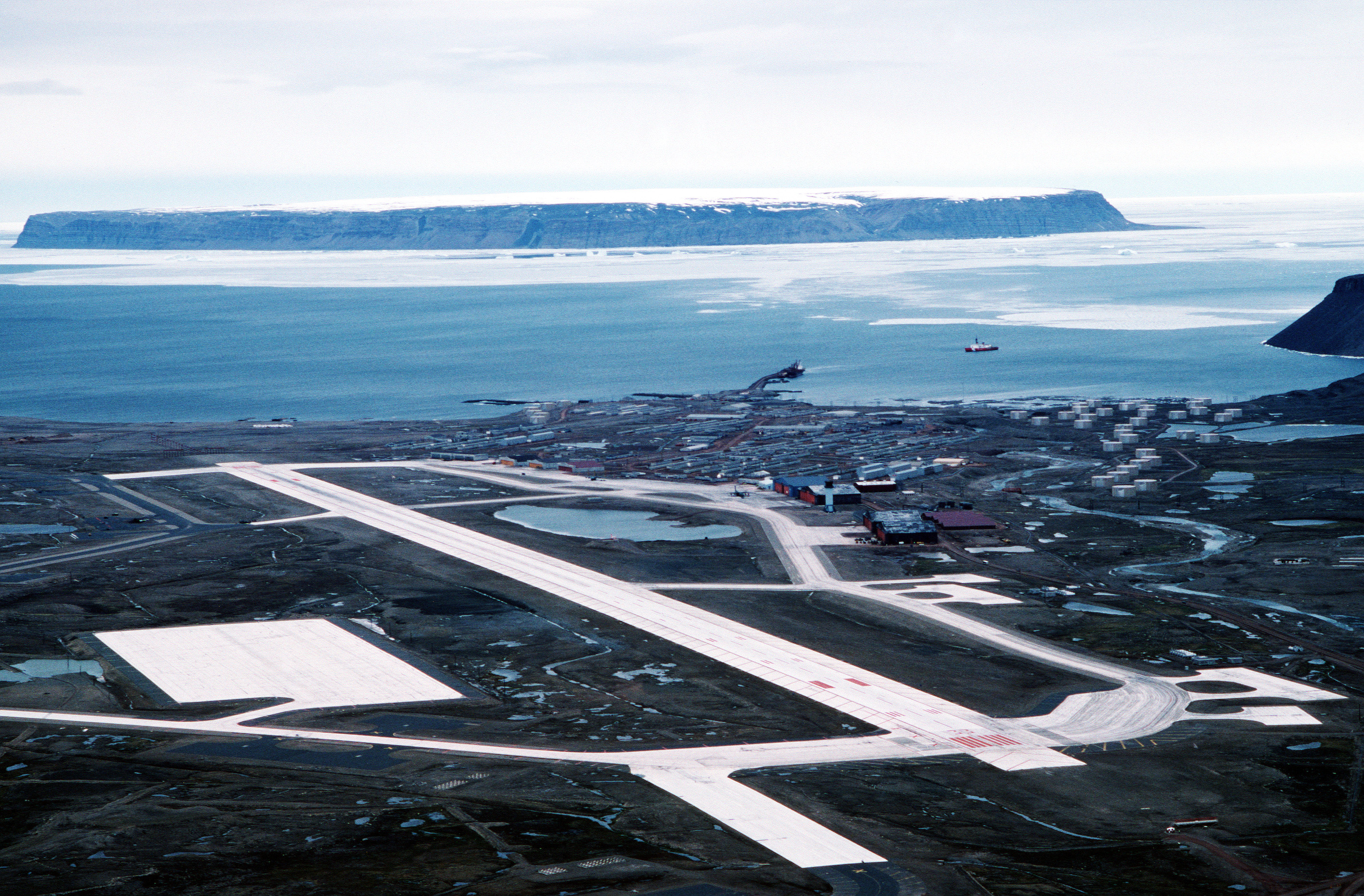
Aerial view, 1989

Pituffik Space Base (/biːduːˈfiːk/, bee-doo-FEEK; Greenlandic: [pitufːik]; IATA: THU, ICAO: BGTL), formerly Thule Air Base (/ˈtuːliː/, TOO-lee), is a United States Space Force base located on the northwest coast of Greenland in the Kingdom of Denmark under a defense agreement between Denmark and the United States.

Denmark was a founding member of NATO in 1949, and the 1951 Greenland Defense Agreement allowed the United States to operate the base under a NATO framework, as long as both Denmark and the United States remain NATO members. Under the agreement, the United States has exclusive jurisdiction over its facilities at the base, but with the Danish flag being required to be flown over the base alongside the American flag and the Danes having the right to station a consulting liaison officer at the base. The 1951 agreement was modified in 2004 to require that the Greenlandic flag also be flown over the base and gave the Greenlandic government the right to appoint a liaison officer for the base. As of 2025, about 150 United States service members are permanently stationed there, down from some 6,000 during the Cold War.

It is the northernmost Department of Defense installation, 1,210 km (750 mi) north of the Arctic Circle and 1,524 km (947 mi) from the North Pole. Pituffik's Arctic environment includes icebergs in North Star Bay, two islands (Saunders Island and Wolstenholme Island), a polar ice sheet, and Wolstenholme Fjord. The base is home to a substantial portion of the global network of missile warning sensors of Space Delta 4, and space surveillance and space control sensors of Space Delta 2, providing space awareness and advanced missile detection capabilities to North American Aerospace Defense Command (NORAD), the United States Space Force, and joint partners.

Pituffik Space Base is also home to the 821st Space Base Group and is responsible for space base support within the Pituffik Defense Area for the multinational "Team Pituffik" population. The base hosts the 12th Space Warning Squadron (12 SWS), which operates a Ballistic Missile Early Warning System (BMEWS) designed to detect and track ICBMs launched against North America. The base is also host to Detachment 1 of the 23rd Space Operations Squadron, part of the Space Delta 6's global satellite control network. The airfield's 3,000 m (10,000 ft) runway handles more than 3,000 US and international flights per year. The base is also home to the northernmost deep water port in the world.

The base was formally transferred to the Space Force in 2020 and was renamed Pituffik Space Base in 2023. It drew attention during the Greenland crisis of 2025 when Colonel Susannah Meyers, the base commander, was relieved of her command after opposing President Donald Trump's statements about annexing Greenland.

== History ==
=== Location and original population ===
In 1818, Sir John Ross's expedition made first contact with nomadic Inughuit in the area. James Saunders's expedition aboard HMS North Star was marooned in North Star Bay in 1849–50 and named landmarks. In 1910 explorer Knud Rasmussen established a missionary and trading post there. He called the site "Thule" after classical ultima Thule; the Inuit called it Umanaq or Uummannaq ("heart-shaped"), and the site is commonly called "Dundas" today. Whaling captain, explorer, and ethnologist George Comer discovered a midden, dubbed Comer's Midden, at Umanaq in 1916, and an archaeological excavation subsequently revealed a village of the proto-Inuit who came to be called the Thule people. The United States abandoned its territorial claims in the area in 1917 in connection with the purchase of the Virgin Islands. Denmark assumed control of the village in 1937.

A cluster of huts known as Pituffik ("quay, dock") stood on the wide plain where the base was built in 1951; a main base street was named Pituffik Boulevard. The population was forcibly relocated to Thule. Later in 1953, the USAF planned to construct an air defense site near that village, and in order to limit contact with soldiers, the Danish government again relocated 130 inhabitants of "Old Thule", settling them 97 km (60 mi) north in a newly constructed village also named Thule (colloquially "New Thule", now Qaanaaq).

In a Danish Supreme Court judgment of 28 November 2003, the move was considered an expropriative intervention. During the proceedings, the Danish government recognized that the movement was a serious interference and an unlawful act against the local population. The Thule tribe was awarded damages of 500,000 kroner, and the individual members of the tribe who had been exposed to the transfer were granted compensation of 15,000 or 25,000 kroner each. A Danish radio station continued to operate at Dundas, and the abandoned houses remained. The USAF used that site only for about a decade, and it has since returned to civilian use.

Knud Rasmussen was the first to recognize the Pituffik Plain as ideal for an airport. USAAF Colonel Bernt Balchen, who built Sondrestrom Air Base, knew Rasmussen and his idea. Balchen led a flight of two Consolidated PBY Catalina flying boats to Thule on 24 August 1942 and then sent a report advocating an air base to USAAF chief Henry "Hap" Arnold. However, the 1951 air base site is a few kilometers inland from the original 1946 airstrip and across the bay from the historical Thule settlement; an ice road connects it. The joint Danish-American defense area, designated by treaty, also occupies considerable inland territory in addition to the air base itself.

=== World War II ===
After the German occupation of Denmark on 9 April 1940, Henrik Kauffmann, Danish Ambassador to the United States, agreed "In the name of the king" with the United States, authorizing the United States to defend the Danish colonies on Greenland from German aggression. This agreement faced Kauffmann with a charge of high treason by the protectorate Government. Beginning in the summer of 1941, the United States Coast Guard and the War Department established weather and radio stations at Narsarsuaq Airport (Bluie West-1), Sondrestrom Air Base (Bluie West-8), Ikateq (Bluie East Two), and Gronnedal (Bluie West-9). In 1943 the Army Air Forces set up weather stations Scoresbysund (Bluie East-3) on the east coast around the southern tip of Greenland, and Thule (Bluie West-6) to be operated by Danish personnel. Many other sites were set up, but BW-6, isolated in the far North, was then of very minor importance.

=== Joint weather station ===
After liberation, Denmark ratified the Kauffmann treaty but began efforts to take over US installations. Nonetheless, in the summer of 1946, the radio and weather station was enhanced with a gravel airstrip and an upper-air (balloon) observatory. This was part of an American-Canadian initiative to construct joint weather stations in the High Arctic. This station was under joint US-Danish operation. The location changed from the Thule (Dundas) civilian village to mainland Pituffik. From 1946 to 1951, the airstrip played an important role in Arctic resupply, aerial mapping, research, and search-and-rescue.

The treaty's ratification in 1951 did not change much, except that the Danish national flag must be side by side with the US national flag on the base.

=== Thule Air Base ===
In 1949, Denmark joined the North Atlantic Treaty Organization (NATO) and abandoned its attempt to remove the United States bases. By the outbreak of the Korean War the next year, the USAF embarked on a global program of base-building in which Thule (at the time) would be considered the crown jewel owing to its location across the Pole from the Soviet Union, as well as its merit of being the northernmost port to be reliably resupplied by ship. Thule became a key point in American nuclear retaliation strategy. Strategic Air Command (SAC) bombers flying over the Arctic presented less risk of early warning than using bases in the United Kingdom. Defensively, Thule could serve as a base for intercepting bomber attacks along the northeastern approaches to Canada and the United States.

A board of Air Force officers headed by Gordon P. Saville recommended pursuing a base at Thule in November 1950. It was subsequently supported by the Joint Chiefs of Staff and approved by President Truman. To replace the agreement entered into during World War II between the US and Denmark, a new agreement concerning Greenland was signed on 27 April 1951 and ratified by Denmark on 1 June 1951 (effective on 8 June 1951). At the request of NATO, the agreement became a part of the NATO defense program. The pact specified that the two nations would arrange for the use of facilities in Greenland by NATO forces in defense of the NATO area known as the Greenland Defense Area.

Thule Air Base was constructed in secret under the code name Operation Blue Jay, but the project was made public in September 1952. Construction for Thule Air Base began in 1951 and was completed in 1953. The construction of Thule is said to have been comparable in scale to the enormous effort required to build the Panama Canal. The United States Navy transported the bulk of men, supplies, and equipment from the naval shipyards in Norfolk, Virginia. On 6 June 1951, an armada of 120 ships sailed from Naval Station Norfolk. On board were 12,000 men and 300,000 tons of cargo. They arrived at Thule on 9 July 1951. Construction, aided by continuous daylight in summer, took place around the clock. The workers lived on board the ships until quarters were built. Once they moved into the quarters, the ships returned home.

On 16 June 1951, the base was accidentally discovered by French cultural anthropologist and geographer Jean Malaurie and his Inuit friend Kutikitsoq, on their way back from the geomagnetic North Pole.

==== Strategic Air Command ====
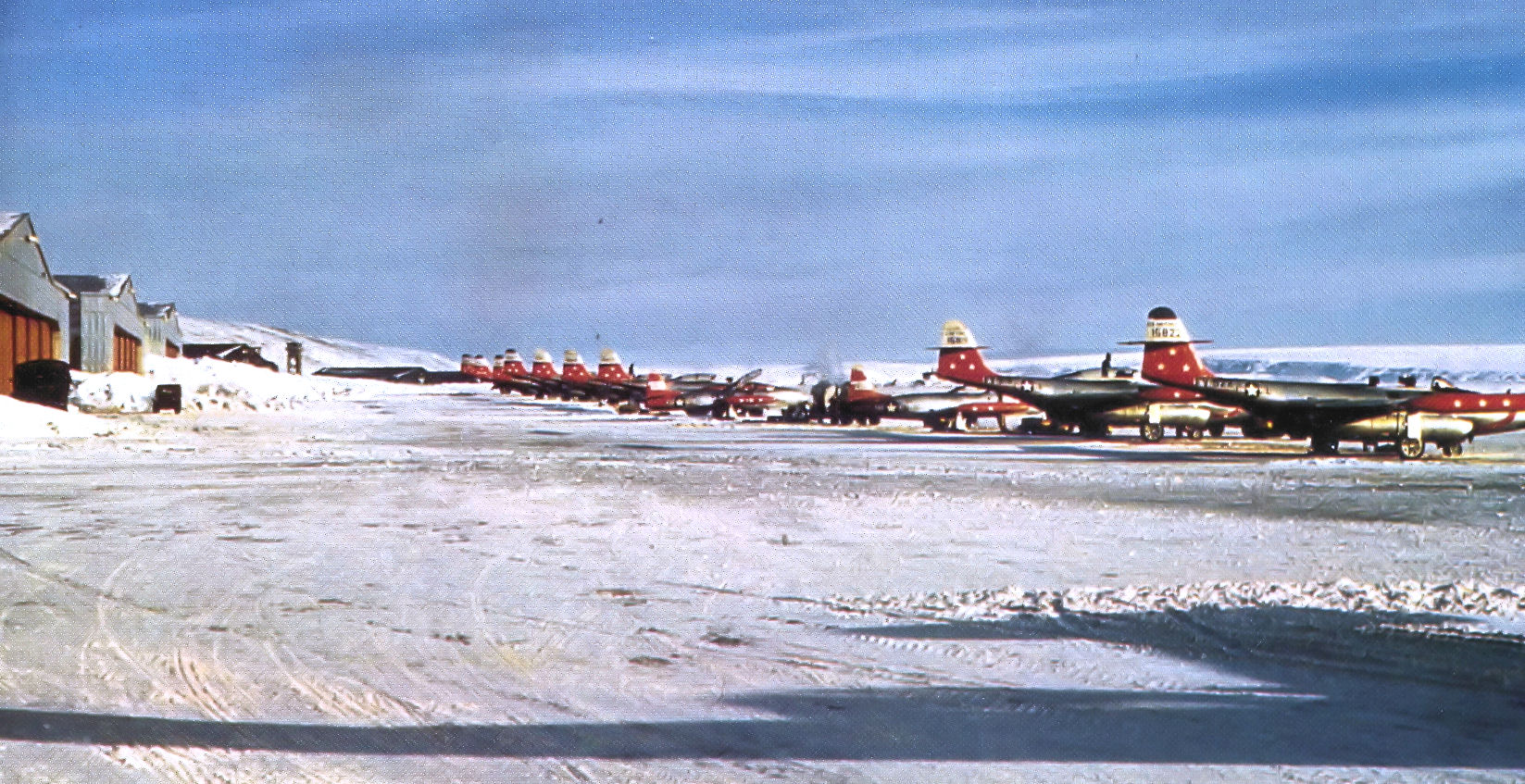
74th Fighter-Interceptor Squadron F-89s, Thule Air Base, Greenland, 1955

Originally established as a Strategic Air Command installation, Thule periodically served as a dispersal base for B-36 Peacemaker and B-47 Stratojet aircraft during the 1950s. It also provided an ideal site to test the operability and maintainability of these weapon systems in extreme cold weather. Similar operations were also conducted with B-52 Stratofortress aircraft in the 1950s and 1960s.

In 1954, the 378 m (1,240 ft) Globecom Tower, a tower for military radio communication, was built at Northmountain. At the time of its completion, it was the third tallest human-made structure on earth and the tallest structure north of the Arctic Circle in the Western hemisphere.

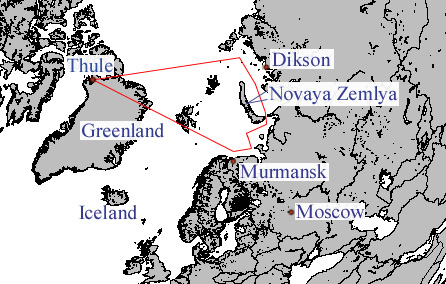
Reconnaissance route from Thule Air Base to Soviet Union

In the winter of 1956–1957, three KC-97 tankers and alternately one of two RB-47H aircraft made polar flights to inspect Soviet defenses. Five KC-97s were prepared for flight with engines running in temperatures of −46 °C (−50 °F) to ensure three could achieve airborne status. After a two-hour head start, a B-47 would catch up with them at the northeast coastline of Greenland where two would offload fuel to top off the B-47's tanks (the third was an air spare). The B-47 would then fly seven hours of reconnaissance, while the tankers would return to Thule, refuel, and three would again fly to rendezvous with the returning B-47 at northeast Greenland. The B-47 averaged ten hours and 4,500 km (2,800 mi) in the air, unless unpredictable weather closed Thule. In that case, the three tankers and the B-47 had to additionally fly to one of three equidistant alternates: England, Alaska, or Labrador. This sometimes occurred in moonless, 24-hour Arctic darkness, December through February. These flights demonstrated the capabilities of the US Strategic Air Command to Soviet Anti-Air Defense.

In 1959, the airbase was the main staging point for the construction of Camp Century, some 240 km (150 mi) from the base. Carved into the ice, and powered by a nuclear reactor, PM-2A Camp Century was officially a scientific research base, but in reality was the site of the top secret Project Iceworm. The camp operated from 1959 until 1967.

In the late 1950s, the DEW 1 to 4 were built as "weather stations". Thule Air Base would act as a supply station for the DYE bases.

Other nearby installations built at the time that received support from Thule Air Base included the Cape Atholl (LORAN station), Camp TUTO (Ice Cap Approach Ramp and Airstrip), Sites 1 and 2 (Ice Cap Radar Stations), Pingarssuit Mountain ("P Mountain") (radar and communications site), Thule Site J (BMEWS), North and South Mountains (research sites), and a research rocket firing site. It also was essential in the construction and resupply of High Arctic weather stations, including CFS Alert (Alert Airport) and Station Nord.

==== Aerospace defense ====
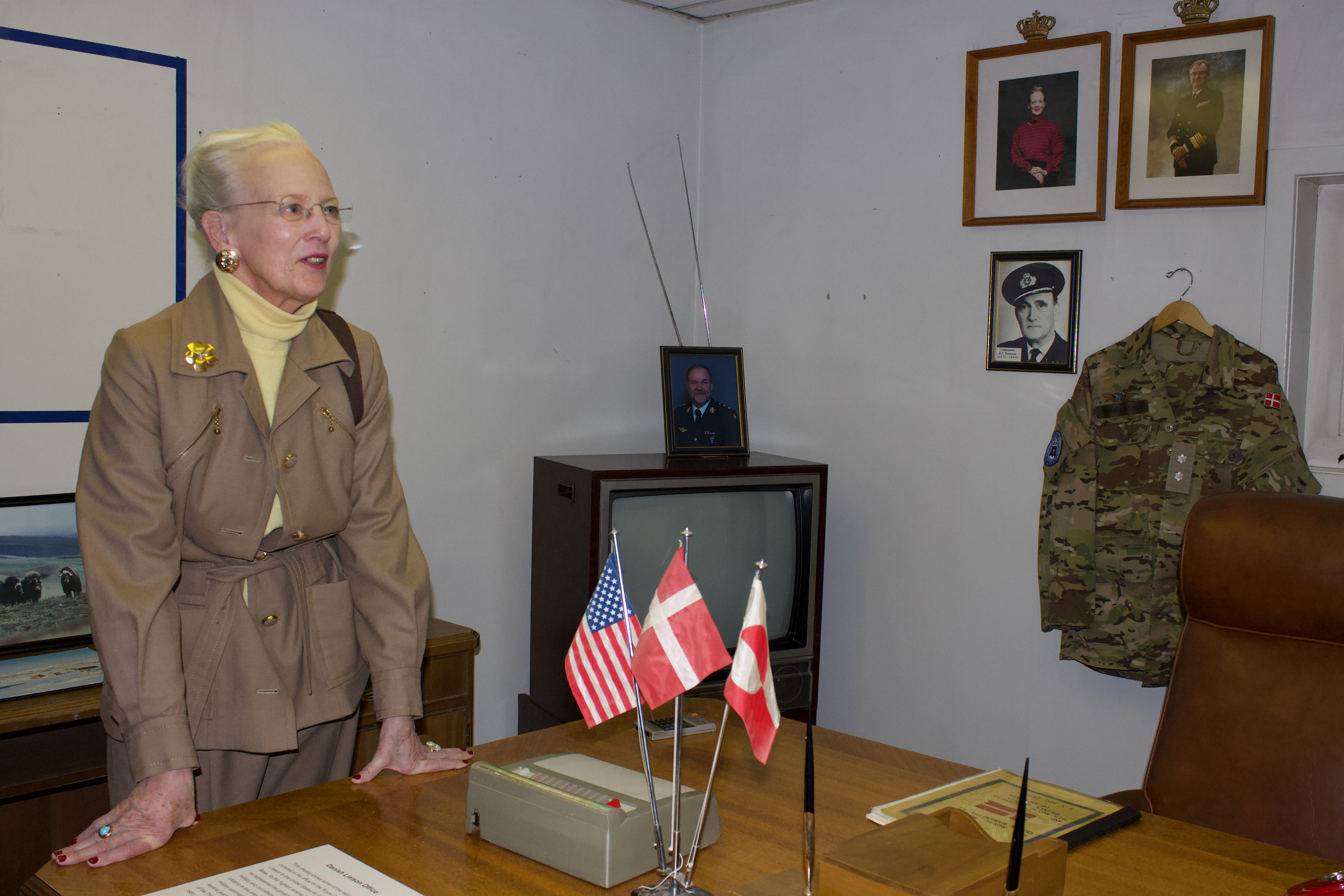
Queen Margrethe II during a visit to the base on 11 October 2021

In 1957, construction began on four Nike Missile sites around the base, and they and their radar systems were operational by the end of 1958.

In 1961, a Ballistic Missile Early Warning System (BMEWS) radar was constructed at "J-Site", 21 km (13 mi) northeast of the main base. BMEWS was developed by the RCA Corporation to warn North America of a transpolar missile attack from the Russian mainland and submarine-launched missiles from the Arctic and North Atlantic oceans. At this time, Thule was at its peak, with a population of about 10,000. Starting in July 1965, activities at Thule were generally downsized. The base host unit, the 4683d Air Defense Wing, was discontinued. By January 1968, the population of Thule was down to 3,370. On 21 January 1968, a B-52G bomber carrying four nuclear weapons crashed just outside Thule.

Thule is the location where the fastest recorded sea level surface wind speed in the world was measured when a peak speed of 333 km/h (207 mph) was recorded on 8 March 1972, immediately prior to the instrument's destruction.

==== Air Force Space Command ====
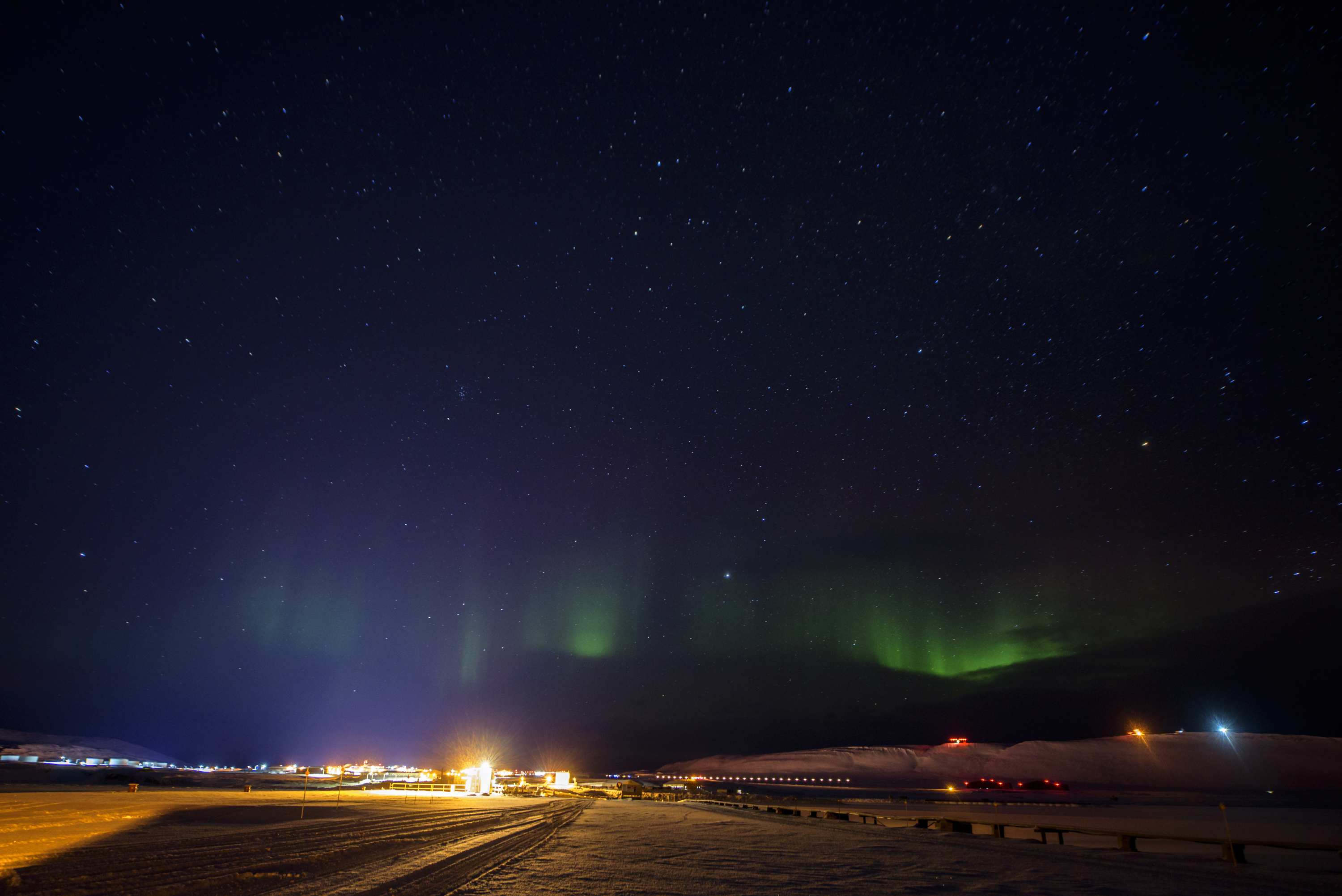
Aurora over Thule Air Base in 2017

Thule became an Air Force Space Command base in 1982. The US and Denmark agreed to reduce the base to half its original area on 30 September 1986. It was home to the 821st Space Base Group, which exercised air base support responsibilities within the Thule Defense Area. The base hosts the 12th Space Warning Squadron (21st Operations Group, 21st Space Wing), a Ballistic Missile Early Warning Site designed to detect and track ICBMs launched against North America. Missile warning and space surveillance information flows to NORAD command centers located at Peterson Space Force Base, Colorado. Thule is also host to Detachment 1 of the 23rd Space Operations Squadron, part of the 50th Space Wing's global satellite control network, as well as operating many new weapons systems. In addition, the airfield boasts a 3,047 by 42 m (9,997 by 138 ft) asphalt runway, with 3,000 US and international flights per year.

The Dundas Peninsula, including Old Thule and Uummannaq, was relinquished by the US and returned to Danish jurisdiction on 20 February 2003. A delegation from the NATO Parliamentary Assembly visited Thule in early September 2010 and were told by the base commander that, at that time (summer), approximately 600 personnel were serving at Thule, a mix of mostly US and Danish active duty personnel and contractors.

In 2015-2016, the runway was repaved, the first time since 1991. The runway is white to reduce permafrost thawing. Previously painted white, during the re-paving, extruded polystyrene foam boards were used in 18% of the runway instead of white.

There is only a brief period each year in the summer when sea ice thins sufficiently to send supply ships to the base. The US sends one heavy supply ship each summer in what is called Operation Pacer Goose.

=== Pituffik Space Base ===
In 2020, Thule Air Base was formally transferred to the United States Space Force. On 6 April 2023, Thule was renamed Pituffik Space Base, reflecting its status as a Space Force base and the native name for the region.

==== Opposition to Trump Greenland threats ====
On 28 March 2025, Vice President JD Vance, his wife Usha, and Mike Waltz, the national security adviser, toured the base, as part of a trip arranged by the Trump administration. Vance was the most senior US government official ever to visit the base. The visit came during a time of renewed discussion of the proposed acquisition of Greenland by President Donald Trump and was opposed by some Greenlanders. On 11 April 2025, the base commander, Colonel Susannah Meyers, was relieved of command by the Trump administration for "undermining" Vice President Vance after his visit by sending an email to base personnel (staffed by Americans, Canadians, Danes, and Greenlanders) that included: "I spent the weekend thinking about Friday's visit [by VP Vance]—the actions taken, the words spoken, and how it must have affected each of you. I do not presume to understand current politics, but what I do know is the concerns of the US administration discussed by Vice President Vance on Friday are not reflective of Pituffik Space Base. I commit that, for as long as I am lucky enough to lead this base, all of our flags will fly proudly—together".

=== Major commands to which assigned ===
- Northeast Air Command, 1 July 1951 – 1 April 1957
- Strategic Air Command
  Eighth Air Force, 1 April 1957 – 1 July 1960
- Air Defense Command (later redesignated Aerospace Defense Command) 15 January 1968, 1 July 1960 – 1 December 1979
- Strategic Air Command, 1 December 1979 – 30 September 1992
- Air Force Space Command, 30 September 1992 – 20 December 2019
- United States Space Force, 20 December 2019 – Present

=== Major air and space units assigned ===
Sources for major commands and major units assigned:

- 662nd Air Base Squadron, 20 July 1951
  Redesignated: 6612th Air Base Group, 1 January 1952
  Redesignated: 6607th Air Base Wing, 1 June 1954 – 1 April 1957
- 318th Fighter Interceptor Squadron, 1 July 1953 – 5 August 1954
- 74th Fighter-Interceptor Squadron, 20 August 1954 – 25 June 1958
- 320th Air Refueling Squadron, 4 May 1955 – 10 June 1957
  Detached from 320th Bombardment Wing, March AFB, California
- 509th Air Refueling Squadron, c. 17 June 1955 – c. 3 August 1955
  Detached from 509th Bombardment Wing, Walker AFB, New Mexico
- 96th Air Refueling Squadron, 13 July 1955 – 14 September 1955
  Detached from 96th Bombardment Wing, Altus AFB, Oklahoma
- 26th Air Refueling Squadron, 9 September 1955 – 2 November 1955; 5 September 1956 – 15 December 1956
  Detached from 380th Bombardment Wing, Plattsburgh AFB, New York
- 42d Air Refueling Squadron, 2 November 1955 – 28 December 1955; 1 January 1957 – 7 March 1957
  Detached from 42d Bombardment Wing, Loring AFB, Maine
- 71st Air Refueling Squadron, 29 December 1955 – 27 March 1956
  Detached from 2d Bombardment Wing, Barksdale AFB, Louisiana
- 341st Air Refueling Squadron, 27 March 1956 – 26 June 1956
  Detached from 341st Bombardment Wing, Dyess AFB, Texas
- 40th Air Refueling Squadron, 27 June 1956 – 4 September 1956; c. 1 October 1958 – January, 9 1959
  Detached from 40th Bombardment Wing, Smoky Hill AFB, Kansas
- 340th Air Refueling Squadron, 29 October 1956 – 30 December 1956
  Detached from 340th Bombardment Wing, Whiteman AFB, Missouri
- 100th Air Refueling Squadron c. 2 Jan 1958 – 2 Apr 1958, Detached from 100th Bomb Wing Pease AFB New Hampshire
- 509th Air Refueling Squadron c. 3 Apr 1958 – 4 Jul 1959, Detached from 509th Bomb Wing Pease AFB New Hampshire
- 4083d Strategic Wing, 1 April 1957 – 1 July 1959
- 4083d Air Base Group, 1 April 1957
  Redesignated: 4083d Air Base Wing, 1 July 1960
  Redesignated: 4083d Air Base Group, 1 October 1960
  Redesignated: 4683d Combat Support Group, 1 July 1965
  Redesignated: 4683d Air Base Group, 1 July 1970 – 1 October 1977
- 4683d Air Defense Wing, 1 July 1960 – 1 July 1965
- 327th Fighter-Interceptor Squadron, 3 July 1958 – 25 March 1960
- 332d Fighter-Interceptor Squadron, 1 September 1960 – 1 July 1965
- OL-5, 6594th Test Wing (Satellite), Air Force Systems Command, 15 October 1961
  Redesignated: 22nd Space Operations Squadron, 1 June 1997
  Redesignated: Det 3, 22d Space Operations Squadron, 1 May 2004
  Redesignated: Det 1, 23d Space Operations Squadron, 1 October 2010 – present
- 12th Missile Warning Group, 31 March 1977
  Redesignated: 12th Missile Warning Squadron, 15 June 1983
  Redesignated: 12th Missile Warning Group, 1 October 1989
  Redesignated: 12th Space Warning Squadron, 15 May 1992 – present
- 4711th Air Base Squadron, 31 March 1977
  Redesignated: 4685th Air Base Squadron, 1 October 1980 – 31 March 1981
- 821st Air Base Group, 1 June 2002 – present
  Redesignated: 821st Space Base Group, 6 April 2023

=== Major Army units assigned ===
- 4th Battalion, 55th Artillery, 1 Sep 1958 – 20 Dec 1965. (Nike)
- 7th Anti-Aircraft Artillery Group, 1 July 1955 – 20 December 1965 (Redesignated 7th Artillery Group 20 March 1958) [A, B, C, and D Batteries 90mm AAA cannon; 549th 75mm AAA BN (Sky Sweeper); 51st Ordnance Company]

== Remote tracking station ==
Thule Tracking Station (TTS) is operated by Pituffik Space Base, using the callsign POGO. The station 76°30′57″N 68°36′0″W) is a US Space Force installation in Greenland, near the base, and has a Remote Tracking Station (callsign: Polar Orbiting Geophysical Observatory (POGO)) of the Satellite Control Network.

It was originally the classified 6594th Test Wing's Operating Location 5 designated by Air Force Systems Command on 15 October 1961: the station was operational on 30 March 1962, with "transportable antenna vans parked in an old Strategic Air Command bomb assembly building." The permanent RTS equipment was emplaced in 1964, and a communications terminal was emplaced on Pingarssuit Mountain—Thule Site N-32 (moved to Thule Site J in 1983.

== Based units ==
Notable units based at Pituffik Space Base:

=== United States Space Force ===
Space Force Combat Forces Command

- Space Base Delta 1
  - 821st Space Base Group
    - 821st Support Squadron
    - 821st Security Forces Squadron
- Space Delta 4
  - 12th Space Warning Squadron
- Space Delta 6
  - 23rd Space Operations Squadron
    - Detachment 1

=== USAF tugboat ===
To assist with port operations, Pituffik is home to the only tugboat in the Department of the Air Force, the 71-foot Rising Star (USAF TG-71-9001). In the summertime, the Rising Star escorts fuel tankers and cargo ships, aligns them with the pier, and moves icebergs out of the way as vessels enter North Star Bay. It is also used for sightseeing tours of the surrounding bays and fjords during the summer. In the winter, it is hauled onto shore. In 2020, the tugboat was used to save a sinking ship and its crew of six 50 kilometers (31 mi) south of base, towing the distressed ship back to the port at Pituffik.

== Accidents ==
=== C-124 plane crash (1954) ===
In 1954, a Douglas C-124C Globemaster II operated by the US Air Force crashed on approach to the air base, killing ten people.

=== B-52 nuclear bomber crash (1968) ===
On 21 January 1968, a B-52G Stratofortress from the 380th Strategic Aerospace Wing, Plattsburgh Air Force Base, New York, on a secret airborne nuclear alert crashed and burned on the ice near Thule Air Base. The impact detonated the high explosives in the primary units of all four of the B28 nuclear bombs it carried, but nuclear and thermonuclear reactions did not take place due to the PAL and fail-safe mechanisms in the weapons, thus preventing the actual detonation of the weapons themselves. The resulting fire caused extensive radioactive contamination. More than 700 Danish civilians and US military personnel worked under hazardous conditions, the former without protective gear, to clean up the nuclear material. In 1987, nearly 200 Danish workers tried unsuccessfully to sue the United States. Kaare Ulbak, chief consultant to the Danish National Institute of Radiation Hygiene, said Denmark had carefully studied the health of the Thule workers and found no evidence of increased mortality or cancer.

The United States Department of Defense maintained that all four weapons had been destroyed. Although many of the details of the accident are still classified, some information was released by the US authorities in September 1994 under the Freedom of Information Act. After reviewing these files, an investigative reporter from BBC News claimed in May 2007 that the USAF was unable to account for one of the weapons. In 2009, the assertions of the BBC were refuted by a Danish report after a review of the available declassified documentation.

== Airlines and destinations ==
=== Airlines ===
As of 2010, one airline provided commercial service to Pituffik.

| Airlines | Destinations |
|---|---|
| Air Greenland | Qaanaaq, Savissivik; Charter: Copenhagen, Kangerlussuaq |

=== Cargo shipping ===
Schuyler Line Navigation Company, a US flag ocean carrier, provides ocean transportation. Schuyler Line operates under a government contract to supply sustainment and building supplies to the base.

== Climate ==
Pituffik has a tundra climate (ET) with long, severely cold winters lasting most of the year and short and cool summers. Precipitation is very low year round, but peaks during summer. The structures of the base are built on permafrost, which makes them vulnerable to the effects of climate change.

Climate data for Pituffik Space Base, Greenland
| Month | Jan | Feb | Mar | Apr | May | Jun | Jul | Aug | Sep | Oct | Nov | Dec | Year |
|---|---|---|---|---|---|---|---|---|---|---|---|---|---|
| Mean daily maximum °F (°C) | −2.2 (−19.0) | −5.1 (−20.6) | −4.2 (−20.1) | 9.0 (−12.8) | 27.3 (−2.6) | 39.6 (4.2) | 45.3 (7.4) | 43.2 (6.2) | 33.1 (0.6) | 19.9 (−6.7) | 8.8 (−12.9) | -0.0 (−17.8) | 17.9 (−7.8) |
| Mean daily minimum °F (°C) | −16.6 (−27.0) | −19.1 (−28.4) | −18.0 (−27.8) | −5.8 (−21.0) | 16.5 (−8.6) | 30.7 (−0.7) | 35.8 (2.1) | 34.9 (1.6) | 24.8 (−4.0) | 9.0 (−12.8) | −4.2 (−20.1) | −13.0 (−25.0) | 6.2 (−14.3) |
| Average precipitation inches (mm) | 0.2 (5.1) | 0.2 (5.1) | 0.2 (5.1) | 0.2 (5.1) | 0.3 (7.6) | 0.3 (7.6) | 0.6 (15) | 0.9 (23) | 0.7 (18) | 0.5 (13) | 0.4 (10) | 0.3 (7.6) | 5.0 (130) |
Source: www.climate-charts.com/Locations/g/GL04202.html

== Film ==
Pituffik Space Base is depicted in the 2023 documentary film The Color of Ice, which follows scientists testing a hot-tip drill to melt into the ice sheet at the edge of the base. The film highlights how the ice-sheet surface at TUTO Ramp Road, which was built by United States Army Corps of Engineers for ice-sheet access to Camp Century in the 1960s, has melted downwards by almost 100 feet (30 m). Pituffik Space Base itself is arguably presented as a liminal space in the film.

== See also ==
- Annoatok
- Bluie West Seven
- Camp Century
- Camp Fistclench
- Camp TUTO
- Project Iceworm
- Eastern Air Defense Force (Air Defense Command)
- Etah, Greenland
- Gerald Gustafson
- Guantanamo Bay Naval Base, an American base in Cuba with a similar lease agreement
- Kee Bird

== Other sources ==
- This article incorporates public domain material from the Air Force Historical Research Agency
- This article incorporates public domain material from 821st Air Base Group. United States Air Force.
- Balchen, Bernt. Come North With Me. EP Dutton, New York, 1958.
- Fletcher, Harry R. (1989) Air Force Bases Volume II, Active Air Force Bases outside the United States of America on 17 September 1982. Maxwell AFB, Alabama: Office of Air Force History. ISBN 0-912799-53-6
- Maurer, Maurer. Air Force Combat Units of World War II. Washington, DC: U.S. Government Printing Office 1961 (republished 1983, Office of Air Force History, ISBN 0-912799-02-1).
- Ravenstein, Charles A. Air Force Combat Wings Lineage and Honors Histories 1947–1977. Maxwell Air Force Base, Alabama: Office of Air Force History 1984. ISBN 0-912799-12-9.
