= Hull-Kauffmann agreement =

The Agreement relating to the Defense of Greenland
- Signed: 9 April 1941; 85 years ago
- Location: Washington, D.C., United States
- Effective: 9 April 1941; 85 years ago
- Signatories: 2
- Parties: 2
- Languages: English; Danish

The Hull-Kauffmann agreement (officially the Agreement relating to the Defense of Greenland) was an executive agreement under which the United States took on the defence of Greenland during the World War II. Itwas signed on April 9, 1941, in Washington, D.C., by U.S. Secretary of State Cordell Hull and Danish Minister to the United States Henrik de Kauffmann.

== Background and Context ==
Denmark had been occupied by Nazi Germany since April 9, 1940. With the Danish government under German control and unable to exercise authority over its territory of Greenland, Kauffmann acted independently "in the name of the King" (with the concurrence of Greenland's local authorities). The U.S. viewed Greenland as strategically vital to prevent it from becoming a base for Axis aggression against the Western Hemisphere, consistent with the Monroe Doctrine and the 1940 Act of Havana.

== Key Provisions ==
The United States explicitly recognized and respected Danish sovereignty over Greenland. The U.S. was granted the right to construct, maintain, and operate landing fields, seaplane facilities, radio and meteorological stations, harbors, roads, fortifications, and other defense installations necessary for the defense of Greenland and the American continent.

These facilities could also be used by other American nations for hemispheric defense. The agreement allowed the U.S. to lease needed areas of land and water for the duration of the arrangement. It considered at the time as a temporary measure tied to the wartime emergency.

== Aftermath ==
The Danish government in occupied Copenhagen immediately rejected the agreement, recalled Kauffmann, and charged him with high treason. The United States continued to recognize him as the legitimate Danish representative, stating that the Copenhagen government was acting under duress. After Denmark’s liberation, the agreement was ratified by the free Danish government. It provided the legal foundation for U.S. military presence in Greenland during World War II and later influenced post-war arrangements, including the eventual establishment of Thule Air Base.

== See also ==
- Greenland crisis
- Proposed United States acquisition of Greenland
