= Susannah Meyers =

American military officer

- Military career
- Branch: United States Space Force
- Rank: Colonel
- Commands: Pituffik Space Base
- Known for: Opposing Donald Trump's annexation of Greenland push

Susannah Meyers is a former American colonel in the United States Space Force.

She served as the commander of the Pituffik Space Base, the northernmost U.S. military installation as the highest-ranking U.S. officer in Greenland. She was fired by the Trump administration after opposing Trump's statements about annexing Greenland.

== Career ==
She served for nearly two decades in the United States Air Force and transferred to the United States Space Force in 2021. She assumed command of Pituffik Space Base in July 2024.

She is known for distancing the U.S. military in Greenland from the Greenland crisis, stating that the views of the US administration regarding the proposal to annex Greenland "are not reflective of Pituffik Space Base". Her statement led to her being fired by the Trump administration for allegedly "undermining" the effort to annex Greenland. A profile in Ms. magazine described her as part of "a lineage of officers who accepted personal costs to uphold the apolitical ethos of the U.S. armed forces."
