= Thule Site J =

United States Space Force radar station in Greenland

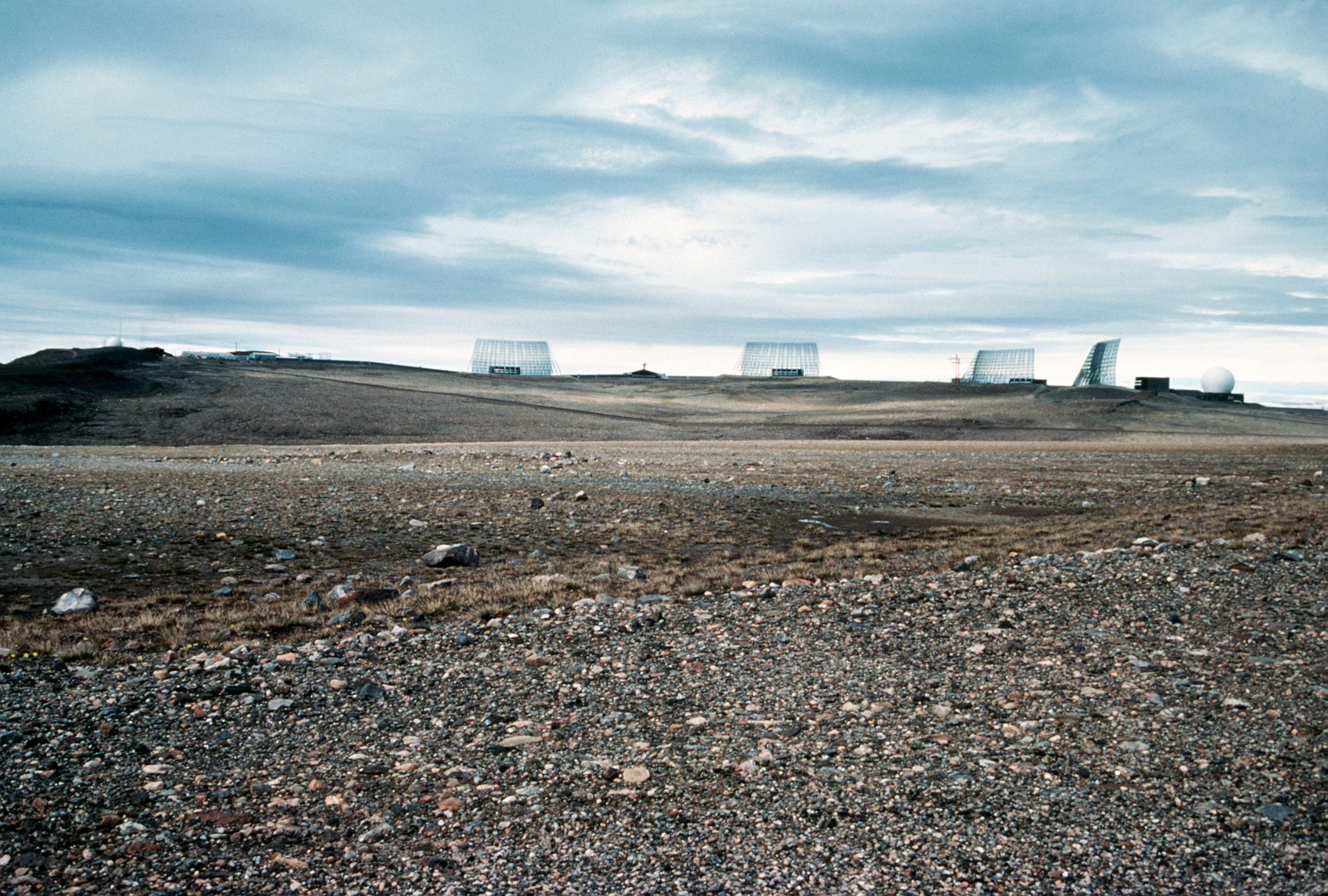
- Thule AN/FPS-50 detection reflectors (1959–1987)--concrete foundations included a large refrigeration system to prevent the curing concrete's heat from melting Permafrost.
- Interactive map of the Thule Site J area

General information
- Type: radar structures
- Location: 10 miles from Thule AB (13 road miles), Greenland
- Coordinates: 76.570258°N 68.298998°W Early Warning Radar 76.56785°N 68.284214°W AN/FPS-49A bldg
- Opened: 1958-60 (AN/FPS-50); 1963 (AN/FPS-49A); 1987 (AN/FPS-120)

Thule Site J (J-Site) is a United States Space Force (USSF) radar station in Greenland near Pituffik Space Base for missile warning and spacecraft tracking. The northernmost station of the Solid State Phased Array Radar System, the military installation was built as the 1st site of the RCA 474L Ballistic Missile Early Warning System and had 5 of 12 BMEWS radars. The station has the following structures:

- "EWR facility": structure with a Solid State Phased Array Radar System (SSPARS) phased array radar
- BMEWS radar buildings: 3 of the 4 former AN/FPS-50 buildings, 1 AN/FPS-49A building
- Support structures: e.g., buildings with telecommunication equipment at the station's "support site" (cf. "technical site" with radar)—15 major structures were complete in 1961 (i.e., Bldg 98 which was for the original BRCS)

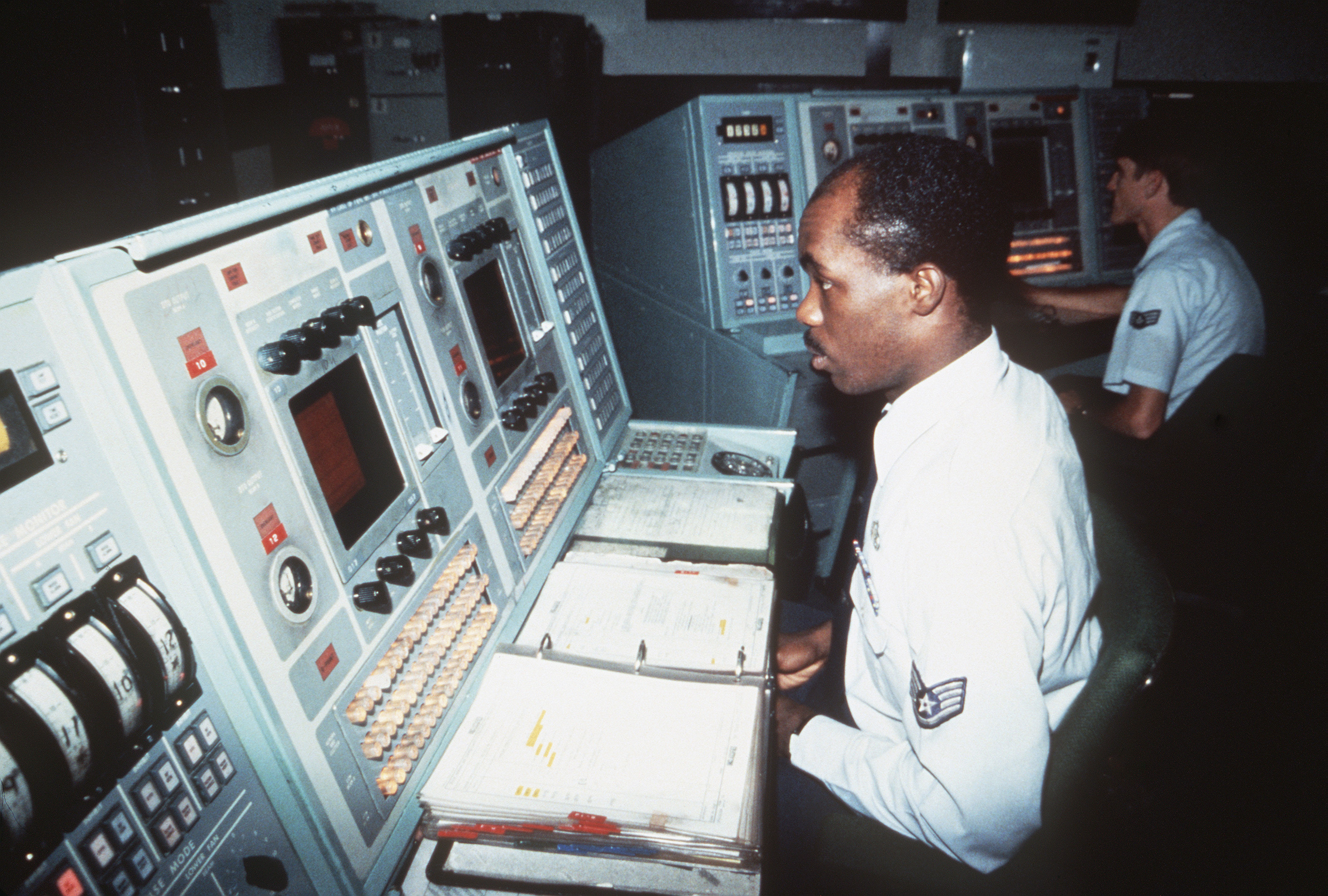
BMEWS tracking monitors in the Thule Tactical Operations Room

== History ==
PAVE PAWS (blue) and BMEWS (red) sites and coverage

BMEWS General Operational Requirement 156 was issued on 7 November 1957 (BMEWS had originally been "designed to go with the active portion of the WIZARD system") and on 4 February 1958; the USAF informed Air Defense Command (ADC) that BMEWS was an "all-out program" and was "...being placed on the Department of Defense master urgency list." On 14 January 1958, the US announced its "decision to establish a Ballistic Missile Early Warning System" with Thule to be operational in 1959—total Thule and Clear Air Force Station costs in a May 1958 estimate were ~$800 million (an 13 October 1958, plan for both estimated completion in September 1960.)

A World War II ship (freighter) operated by the Burns & Roe company originally provided the Site J electrical and heating supplies until a powerplant was constructed years later, and water was from Thule AB via a branch to the site.

=== Construction ===
Kiewit was contracted for heavy construction (e.g., the AN/FPS-50 reflector foundations and tunnels between transmitter buildings), and construction began in May 1958 (a trial reflector installation failed due to ordinary carbon steel bolts instead of 1.5% chrome steel.) The maintenance building with electric heat was the first building complete; and the four AN/FPS-50 reflectors with 25-ton foundations were complete by 8 August 1959 ("two pedestals for trackers" were built for deferred radars.) After the 13 July 1959, treaty No. 5045 with Canada regarding intermediate sites, the Western Electric BMEWS Rearward Communications System (BRCS) was established between the "switchboard at Thule and the BMEWS Project Office in New York City"—a similar line between Thule and Massachusetts used a summer 1959 "submarine cable... between Thule and Cape Dyer" ("BMEWS Rearward Long-Lines System" stations were at CFS Resolution Island & CFS Saglek.) President Dwight D. Eisenhower was notified on 23 April 1960 of "construction work at Thule on schedule [and that] all technical buildings have been accepted and emplacement of the electronic components is underway [and] erection of the four radar antennas was completed", and radar testing began on 16 May 1960—a simplex vacuum tube IBM 709 used as the prototype Missile Impact Predictor (MIP) occupied 2 floors (duplex IBM-709-TX solid-state computers of the AN/FSQ-28 Missile Impact Predictor Set were later installed in Building 2.) To predict when parts "might break down", the contractor also installed a "Checkout Data Processor"--RCA 501 computers with 32k "high speed memory", 5-76KC 556 bpi 3/4" tape drives, & 200 track random access LFE drums. The initial radar transmission from one of the scanner buildings was in August 1960.

=== RCA operations ===
On the same date as the BMEWS Central Computer and Display Facility in the continental United States, "at midnight on 30 September 1960 ["BMEWS Site I"] achieved initial operational capability", and a "shakedown" period followed which used the simplex MIP and voice transmission of data to the Colorado Springs' CC&DF.

False alarms
On 5 October 1960, when Nikita Khrushchev, the Soviet Premier, was in New York, radar returns during Thule moonrise produced a false alarm (on 20 January 1961, CINCNORAD approved 2-second FPS-50 frequency hoping to eliminate reception of echoes beyond artificial satellite orbits.) On 24 November 1961, an AT&T operator error at their Black Forest Microwave Station northeast of Colorado Springs caused a BMEWS communications outage to the Ent AFB CC&DF and its output to Strategic Air Command (a nearby B-52's overflight confirmed Site J had not been attacked.)

The BRCS undersea cable from Greenland had been cut "presumably by fishing trawlers" in September, October, and November 1961 (the BMEWS teletype and backup SSB substituted)--Hard Head missions for continual monitoring commenced in 1961 (the Bomb Alarm System had been installed at the Thule and Clear BMEWS sites by 10 February 1961. After local interference (e.g., "cranes and floor waxers") and equipment problems were mitigated and a 72-hour test verified "the automatic rearward data transmission" (BRCS), the 1961 "authorization to begin fully automatic operation; effective 2400 hours GMT 31 January, was issued" "Lt. Col. Harry J. Wills [was the] senior air force officer on the project at Thule" on 3 January 1961 ("BMEWS deputy program director" by 1964—he was reassigned from the BMEWS SPO to the "Space Track SPO" on 14 February 1964.)

=== Air Defense Command ===
Thule operations transferred from civilian contractors (RCA Government Services) to Air Defense Command on 5 January 1962; and 1962 sinkholes formed in the drainage ditch at "Scanner 6". By mid-1962, BMEWS "quick fixes" for ECCM had been installed for Thule "to recognize when it was being jammed."

An RCA AN/FPS-49A Radar Set with specialized radome for Thule weather was installed by December 1963, and Thule multipath testing was completed by May 1964. In 1967 when the system cost totalled $1.259 billion, BMEWS modification testing ended on 15 May ("completion of the BMEWS"); and the Bomb Alarm System caused a false alarm during the 1968 Thule Air Base B-52 crash (the system was deactivated in 1970.) In June 1980, Thule's FPS-49A radome by Goodyear "burnt to the ground" and was rebuilt, and a late 1960s satellite communications terminal was moved from the Thule P-Mountain site to Site J in 1983. To replace AN/FSQ-28 predictors, a late 1970s plan for processing returns from MIRVs installed new Missile Impact Predictor computers and was complete by September 1984. After being contracted for Thule on 29 July 1983; construction of an AN/FPS-120 Early Warning Radar was started on 7 November 1984, the "array plate" was complete on 26 June 1985, and the 1st satellite track was on 8 June 1986.

=== Solid State Phased Array Radar ===
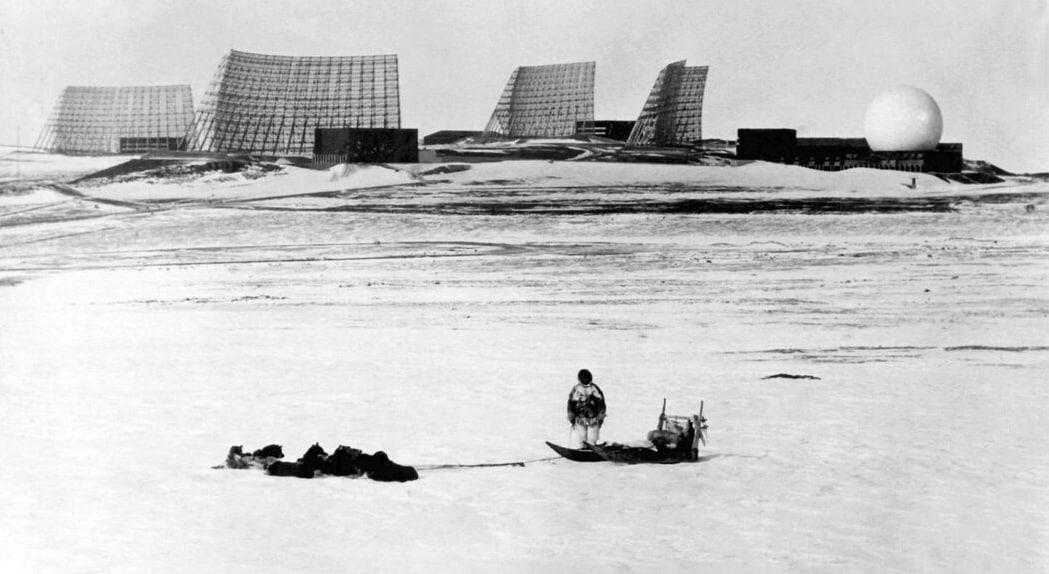
A Greenlandic Inuit man looks at Thule Site J in 1966.

Thule's BMEWS radars were deactivated in June 1987. The BMEWS system at Thule had been "replaced" by the SSPARS AN/FPS-120 with "two-faced…phased array radar [completed] in 2QFY87" (January–March). with 240 degree detection arc The AN/FPS-49A was intact and in disrepair in 1996, and the antenna and radome were removed by 2014. After the Danish parliament approved, Raytheon was contracted in 2005 to upgrade Thule's "Early Warning Radar" as part of the larger Ground-Based Midcourse Defense program. Intended to be ready in 2008, the installation was actually completed on 24 June 2009. Thule's AN/FPS-132 Upgraded Early Warning Radar (UEWR) completes about 10% of the United States' observations of Earth orbiting satellites.
