= 4083d Strategic Wing =

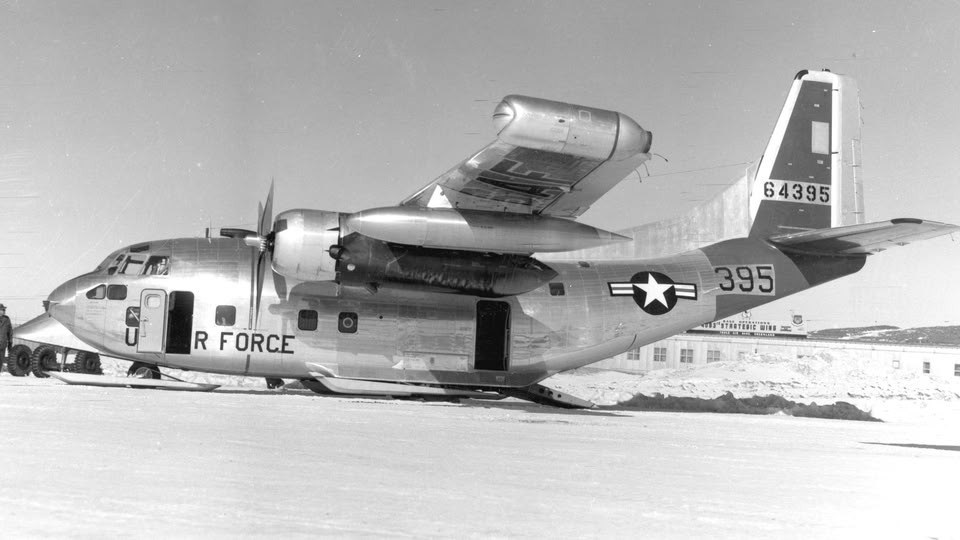
- C-123J at Thule Air Base in 1958 (Note: Note the 4083d Strategic Wing sign in the background. The C-123Js had Fairchild J44 jets mounted on their wingtips, and the type saw extensive use in the arctic. This airplane was originally built as a Fairchild C-123B-19-FA Provider. It was transferred to the Department of the Interior in 1976 and registered as N4393E. It is now on display at Joint Base Elmendorf-Richardson.)
- Active: 1957–1959
- Country: United States
- Branch: United States Air Force
- Role: Support of forward deployed units

Insignia
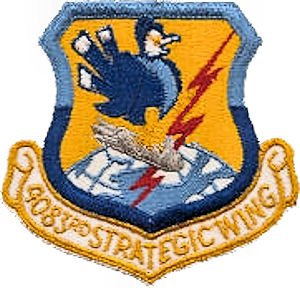
- Patch with 4083rd Strategic Wing Emblem

The 4083d Strategic Wing is a discontinued United States Air Force unit, that was stationed at Thule Air Base, Greenland, where it provided support to forward based Strategic Air Command and NORAD units until it was discontinued on 1 July 1959.

== History ==
The 4083d Strategic Wing was a non-flying ground element for Strategic Air Command (SAC) Eighth Air Force, stationed at Thule Air Base, Greenland. It was established on 1 April 1957 when SAC assumed control of Thule from Northeast Air Command, and assumed the resources (manpower, equipment, and facilities) of the 6607th Air Base Wing, which had been organized on 1 June 1954. It was originally assigned to Eighth Air Force, transferring to Eighth Air Force's 45th Air Division in 1959.

The 4083d primarily providing support for air refueling Boeing KC-97 Stratofreighters operating under the Thule Task Force, Provisional. These aircraft typically operated from Thule on 90-day rotational deployments. The wing also operated Thule's base facilities. It aloso supported the NORAD early warning radar network for United States and Canada.

The wing was discontinued on 1 July 1959 and its subordinate 4083rd Air Base Group was redesignated the 4083rd Air Base Wing and replaced it as the host unit at Thule.

== Lineage ==
- Designated as the 4083rd Strategic Wing, Heavy (Jet) and organized on 1 April 1957

Discontinued on 1 July 1959

=== Assignments ===
- Eighth Air Force, 1 April 1957
- 45th Air Division, 1 January 1959 – 1 July 1959

=== Components ===
4083rd Air Base Group, 1 April 1957 – 1 July 1959 4083rd USAF Hospital, 1 April 1957 – 1 July 1959 4083rd Consolidated Aircraft Maintenance Sq,, 1 April 1957 – 1 July 1959 4083 Operations Sq, 1 April 1957 – 1 July 1959
