= Inner Kitsissut =

Island group in southern Greenland

Indre Kitsissut Torstein Islands
- Location within Greenland

Geography
- Location: Labrador Sea; Southern Greenland
- Coordinates: 60°52′N 48°22′W
- Major islands: Tulugartalik
- Highest elevation: 58 m (190 ft)

Administration
- Greenland
- Municipality: Kujalleq

Demographics
- Population: 0

Inner Kitsissut (Danish: Indre Kitsissut, old spelling Indre Kitsigsut) is an island group in the Kujalleq municipality in southern Greenland.

== Geography ==
Inner Kitsissut is located at the mouth of Coppermine Bay on the southern side, at a minimum distance of 2 km from the shore. It is a compact cluster of small islets and rocks, with a length of 9 km and a width of 6 km. Tulugartalik, the largest islet of the group, has a maximum length of 1.1 km and a height of 58 m.

The Outer Kitsissut group lies 4 kilometres (2 miles) to the southwest of the southern end of the cluster.

== See also ==
- List of islands of Greenland
