= Joint Arctic Command =

Joint Arctic Command Arktisk Kommando Issittumi Sakkutooqarfik
- Founded: 31 October 2012; 13 years ago
- Countries: Kingdom of Denmark
- Allegiance: Faroe Islands; Greenland
- Branch: Joined/shared
- Size: ~130 civilian & military
- Part of: Danish Defence
- Headquarters: Nuuk, Greenland
- Nickname: JACMD - Danish: AKO
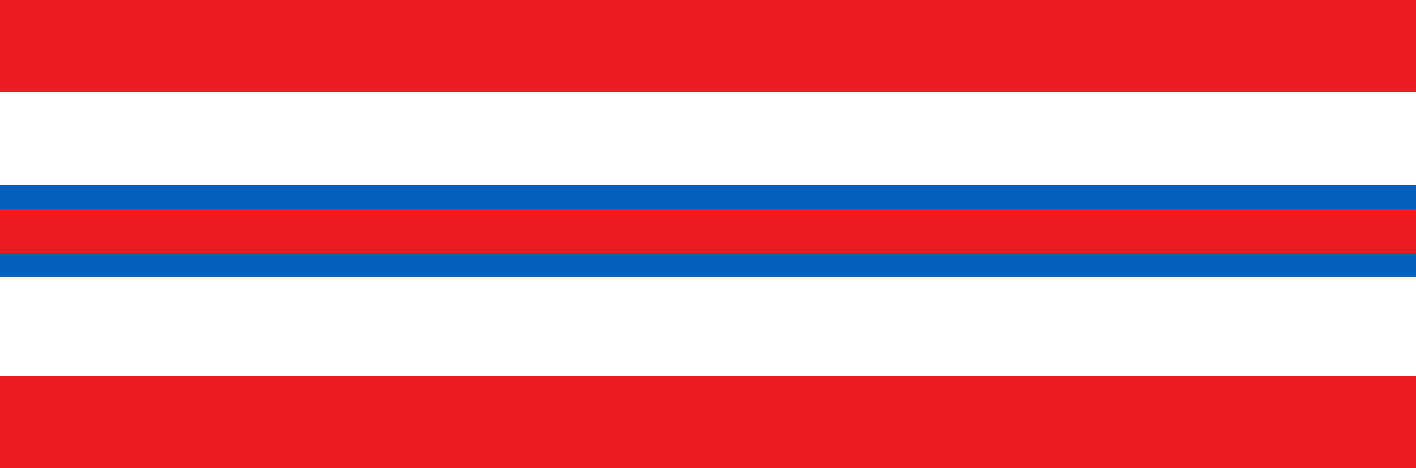
- Stable belt
- Website: Official website Official Facebook

The Joint Arctic Command (JACMD - Danish: Arktisk Kommando; Faroese: Arktisk Kommando; Greenlandic: Issittumi Sakkutooqarfik) is a direct Level II authority in the Danish Defence. Joint Arctic Command's primary mission in peacetime is to ensure Danish sovereignty by monitoring the area around the Faroe Islands and Greenland. The command also handles tasks such as fisheries inspection, search and rescue (SAR), patient transport and other tasks that support the civil society. Thus, the Joint Arctic Command handles military tasks, coast guard duties and disaster response. The Arctic Command has around 150 permanent personnel, but regularly deploys units from across the Danish Defence forces, including the Arctic Response Force with aircraft and ships that stand ready to support forces in Greenland and the Faroe Islands. During the Greenland crisis Denmark has deployed hundreds of additional soldiers to reinforce the defence of Greenland.

== History ==
On 31 October 2012, the Island Command Faroes and Island Command Greenland were merged under the name Joint Arctic Command, which is a joint operational command with serving personnel from the Army, Navy and Air Force, Danish Armed Forces as well as civilians. As a result of the Defence Agreement 2010-2014, it was decided to close the two commands and replace them with the joint service Arctic Command. The command acts as the connection point and coordinator of cooperation between the armed forces and local authorities. Both Island Commands Faroes and Greenland were previously also components of the NATO Military Command Structure (NCS), but there is no confirmation that the new Arctic Command is in the NCS as well.

It is the 1st Squadron that handles tasks pertaining to Arctic Ocean affairs, such as maritime defence and enforcement of sovereignty in Greenlandic and Faroese territorial waters. The 1st Squadron is administratively based at Naval Base Frederikshavn.

It has provided units for international tasks, such as the environmental recovery vessel Gunnar Seidenfaden for the cleanup after the Prestige oil spill and the ocean patrol vessel Thetis for the protection force programme of WFP chartered ships at the Horn of Africa. Vessels operated by 1st Squadron.

In 2019, the Danish Broadcasting Corporation broadcast a four-part documentary about the Joint Arctic Command. The language of the documentary is Danish. The documentary follows a team of Sirius and Station Specialist aspirants and their journey towards Greenland and employment in the Joint Arctic. Moreover, the documentary includes footage from SAR operations - including e.g. the effort in Nuugaatsiaq in 2017.

== Tasks and responsibilities ==
The Joint Arctic Command is responsible for a wide array of tasks in the Arctic. Some of the tasks are solved in collaboration with the Greenland Self-Government and the Faroese National Government, as well as the Greenland Police and the Faroe Islands Police.

Emblem of the Sirius Dog Sled Patrol

- The military defence of Greenland and the Faroe Islands
  - A central task of the Joint Arctic Command is the military defence of the Unity of the realm in the North Atlantic. This task includes surveillance of territory and, if need be, enforcement or sovereignty. In the northern and eastern part of Greenland which is difficult to manoeuvre, the Sirius Dog Sled Patrol, which is a naval unit that belongs under the Joint Arctic Command, conducts long-range reconnaissance patrolling.
- Fisheries Inspections
  - To protect marine resources, the Joint Arctic Command enforces fisheries legislation in the Faroe Islands and in Greenland. The Joint Arctic Command participates in the protection of fish stocks by conducting fisheries inspection and control in Greenland and the Faroe Islands in order to prevent and counter systematic violations of Greenlandic and Faroese legislation.
- Search and rescue service (SAR)
  - The Joint Rescue Coordination Center is a unit under the Joint Arctic Command. The center is responsible for leading the search and rescue operations for which the Arctic Command is responsible in Greenland. Collaboration with Naviair helps to create an overview of air traffic in and around Greenland, and Naviair's duty officer participates in the coordination of the search and rescue aircraft. The Arctic Command Operations Center is staffed 24 hours a day. In the Faroe Islands, a liaison officer is made available to the Maritime Rescue Coordination Center Tórshavn when the Armed Forces' units participate in the search and rescue service.
  - The responsibility is divided in the sense that the Greenland Police is responsible for SAR operations on land and for sea rescue in the coastal waters within 3 nautical miles (5.6 km; 3.5 mi) off the shore. The JACMD is responsible for sea rescue on the high seas as well as for all rescue operations that include aircraft.
  - Denmark and Greenland have entered into an agreement to provide collective SAR assistance to the eight interlocutors in the Arctic Council (Denmark, United States, Canada, Russia, Iceland, Norway, Sweden and Finland). The agreement has been signed in the Arctic Coast Guard Forum under the Arctic Council. The co-operation and division of responsibilities of national organizations in relation to the SAR services of neighboring countries is organized in accordance with recommendations and guidance from the International Maritime Organization (IMO) and the International Civil Aviation Organization.
- Environmental monitoring
  - Arctic Command monitors the waters around Greenland and the Faroe Islands with, among other things, the Air Force's Challenger aircraft. In January 2018, a Danish surveillance satellite was sent into orbit across the Arctic to test monitoring of ships and aircraft in the command area - a collaboration between the Armed Forces, DTU Space and the company GomSpace.
- Pollution control
  - In Greenland, pollution control is a shared task between the self-government and the Danish state. The Government of Greenland is responsible for the territorial sea. That is, the inland and outer territorial waters. Arctic Command is responsible for pollution control on the high seas.
  - In April 2021 the Danish defense, as well as researchers from University of Copenhagen and the Danish company NIRAS, conducted an experiment in removing oil pollution in East Greenland with oil-degrading bacteria. This focus on oil spill recovery and prevention is of high importance in the area.
- Hydrographic surveying
  - It is the responsibility of the Danish state to ensure mapping of the entire kingdom. The Joint Arctic Command helps with this task in the form of hydrographic surveying with the Navy's inspection vessels. A hydrographic survey collects depth, position and time data, which can be used to create a model of the seabed. The vessels used are the inspection vessel Ejnar Mikkelsen and its sea rescue vessel SAR2. A multi-beam echo sounder is installed in the ship's hull for use in the survey.

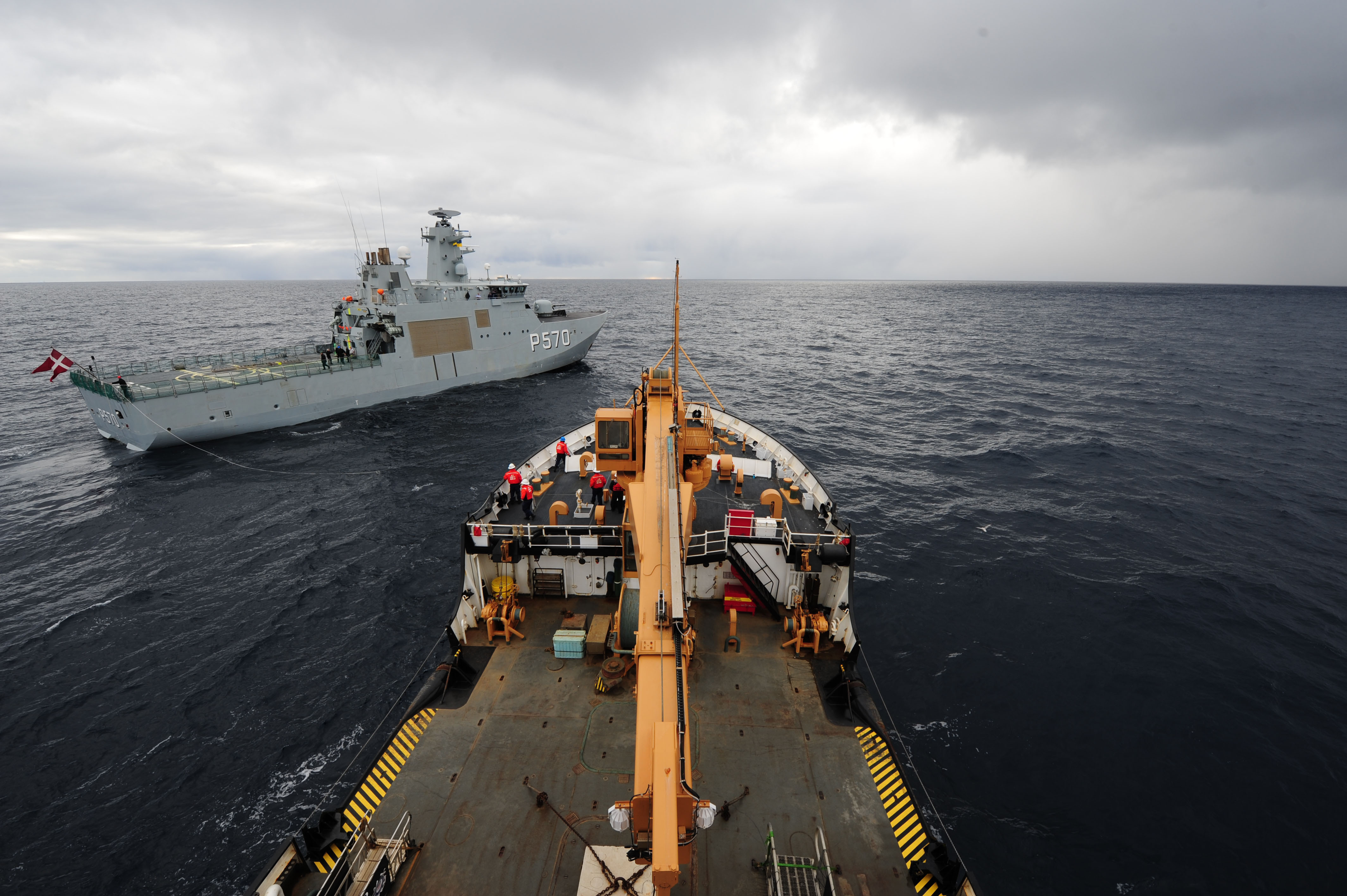
HDMS Knud Rasmussen, a Royal Danish Navy patrol vessel, transits off the bow of the United States Coast Guard cutter Juniper during a towing exercise while underway off Greenland's west coast on 7 September 2012

- Various support tasks for civil society
  - Every year, the Joint Arctic Command provides practical and logistical support for research in the Arctic. For example, the inspection ship Hvidbjørnen for the Greenland Institute of Nature's Climate Research Center has laid out data buoys to map the marine mammals' migration route Arctic Command has also provided support to the Danish Center for Marine Research in Northeast Greenland, as well as researchers from the Greenland Institute of Nature in the Ittoqqortoormiit fjord, who investigated whether narwhals are affected by seismic activity in the sea. In the Faroe Islands, the Arctic Command supports, among other things, munitions clearance.

== Main sites ==
- Nuuk
  - Headquarters is staffed by 80 civilian and military employees, located in Royal Greenland's former headquarters. There were originally three different sites proposed for the location: Nuuk, Narsarsuaq, or Marine Station Grønnedal (Kangilinnguit) where Island Command Greenland previously resided. The Joint Arctic Command share their premises with the American Consulate in Nuuk, Greenland as well as a political adviser from the Danish Ministry of Defense.
    - Moreover, the JACMD are present at Station Nord, Station Kangerlussuaq, Station Mestersvig and Station Daneborg, the latter serving as the headquarters for the Sirius Dog Sled Patrol.
- Thorshavn
  - Contact element Faroe Islands (FEF) rent space in the same building as used by MRCC Tórshavn / Torshavn Radio and the Faroese Contingencies Agency "Tilbúgvingarstovnur Føroya". The location here means an enhanced preparedness and coordination between the civilian and military authorities and tasks. In total there are four military and one civilian employee of the FEF.

== Assigned forces ==
The 1st Squadron of the Royal Danish Navy is primarily focused on national operations in and around the Faroe Islands and Greenland. As of 2023, the 1st Squadron is composed of:

- Four Thetis-class patrol vessels;
- Three Knud Rasmussen-class patrol vessels; and,
- The royal yacht HDMY Dannebrog (having a secondary surveillance and sea-rescue role)

After 2025 the Thetis-class vessels are to be replaced by the planned MPV80-class vessels. The new vessels will incorporate a modular concept enabling packages of different systems (for minehunting or minelaying for example) to be fitted to individual ships as may be required.

To support search and rescue as well as surveillance, Greenland's Joint Rescue Coordination Centre (JRCC) is able to call on C-130J and Challenger 604 aircraft of the Royal Danish Air Force if available. The C-130J is specifically tasked with the re-supply of Danish forces in Greenland. The Challenger 604 is also tasked with assisting in surveillance missions in the Arctic area and since 2021 one aircraft has been permanently stationed in Kangerlussuaq.

== Commanding officer ==
| No. | Photo | Name (born–died) | Term of office | | | Branch | Ref. |
| No. | Photo | Name (born–died) | Took office | Left office | Time in office | Branch | Ref. |
|---|---|---|---|---|---|---|---|
| 1 | | Major general Stig Østergaard Nielsen (born 1954) | 31 October 2012 | 31 October 2015 | 3 years, 0 days | Air force | |
| – | | Captain; Christian Nørgaard (born 1957); Acting | 1 November 2015 | 15 February 2016 | 106 days | Navy | |
| 2 | | Major general Kim Jesper Jørgensen (born 1962) | 15 February 2016 | 14 December 2020 | 4 years, 303 days | Air force | |
| – | | Captain; Dan B. Termansen (born 1967); Acting | 14 December 2020 | 1 June 2021 | 169 days | Navy | |
| 3 | | Counter admiral Martin La Cour-Andersen (born 1963) | 1 June 2021 | 1 May 2023 | 1 year, 334 days | Navy | |
| – | | Brigade general Poul Primdahl (born ?); Acting | 1 May 2023 | 10 August 2023 | 101 days | Army | |
| 4 | | Major general Søren Andersen (born 1966) | 10 August 2023 | Incumbent | 3 years, 3 days | Army | |

== The Joint Arctic Command from a foreign policy perspective ==
In the past decade, there has been an increased awareness of the effects of climate change on the Arctic region. Due to climate change and the melting of land and sea ice, the Arctic region is becoming increasingly accessible. This has brought with it an increased awareness of the opportunity for extraction of natural resources as well as greater commercial and scientific activity in the Arctic. Such development means that the Arctic is becoming increasingly geographically significant in these years. As much is evident in both the news and in academia.

Climate change is leading to increasing economic and research activity and at the same time has a significant security and defence policy impact. As a result, many actors have in recent years increased their focus on the Arctic. The current situation challenges the government's desire to maintain the Arctic as a stable and secure area without conflict.

Therefore, it is the role of the Arctic Command to enforce Danish sovereignty and ensure the safety of residents and visitors.

Maritime Security Operations is an essential part of the Navy's tasks in the North Atlantic and the Arctic, where Denmark, by virtue of the unity of the realm, is co-responsible for maintaining security and stability.

Andreas Østhagen has argued that the maritime activity levels are forcing Arctic coastal states to provide increasing presence and more capabilities. This mirrors the call for continued prioritisation of enhanced maritime security that also exists. In February 2021 it was announced that a new agreement was reached that would strengthen the Armed Forces' capabilities in the Arctic and the North Atlantic. The conciliation group (forligskredsen) decided to grant DKK 1.5 billion from the defence settlement for 2018-2023 provide better opportunities to survey Denmark's territories in the North Atlantic and the Arctic.

It is largely the expectation of increased activity in the Arctic in the form of transport, tourism, fishing and offshore activities that emphasises the importance of, and need for, maritime security in the form of the Danish navy in the Arctic. The Joint Arctic Command is therefore a significant and necessary tool to have for the Unity of the realm in order to enforce the foreign and domestic policy that the Danish government wishes to.

== See also ==
- Sirius Arctic Patrol
- Military in Greenland
- Military of the Faroe Islands
- Danish Defence
- Danish Realm
