= Globecom Tower =

- Interactive map of the Globecom Tower area

General information
- Status: Demolished
- Type: Mast radiator insulated against ground
- Location: Pituffik Space Base, Greenland
- Coordinates: 76°33′10.84″N 68°33′3.45″W
- Elevation: 180.45 m (592.03 ft)
- Completed: 1954
- Destroyed: 1992

Height
- Height: 360 m (1,181.10 ft)

Design and construction
- Main contractor: United States Air Force

Globecom Tower was a 378.25 m (1,240.98 ft) tall guyed mast for military longwave transmission at Northmountain on Pituffik Space Base on Greenland. Globecom Tower, whose design is similar to that of Forestport Tower, is a guyed lattice steel tower with a triangular cross section (sidelength: 4.75 metres), which is anchored in three levels. It is designed as a mast radiator insulated against the ground and equipped with an elevator running up to a height of 360 m (1,181.10 ft).

Globecom Tower was completed in 1954. It was, at completion, the tallest man-made structure outside of the United States and the third tallest in the world after KWTV Mast in Oklahoma City and Empire State Building. A great difficulty at its construction was that the ground on which it was built is permanently frozen.

Globecom Tower was used for transmitting military telex messages to CFB Goose Bay, Canada, on the longwave frequency 68.9 kHz with a power of 50 kW under the callsign XPH.

The tower, unused for years, was brought down with explosive charges set and detonated by US Army combat engineers in the spring of 1992.

== Literature ==
- Turmbauwerke, Bauverlag GmbH, Wiesbaden (Deutschland), Germany, 1966 (there mentioned as "Funkmast in der Arktis")
