= Kangilinnguit =

Settlement in Greenland

Kangilinnguit Grønnedal
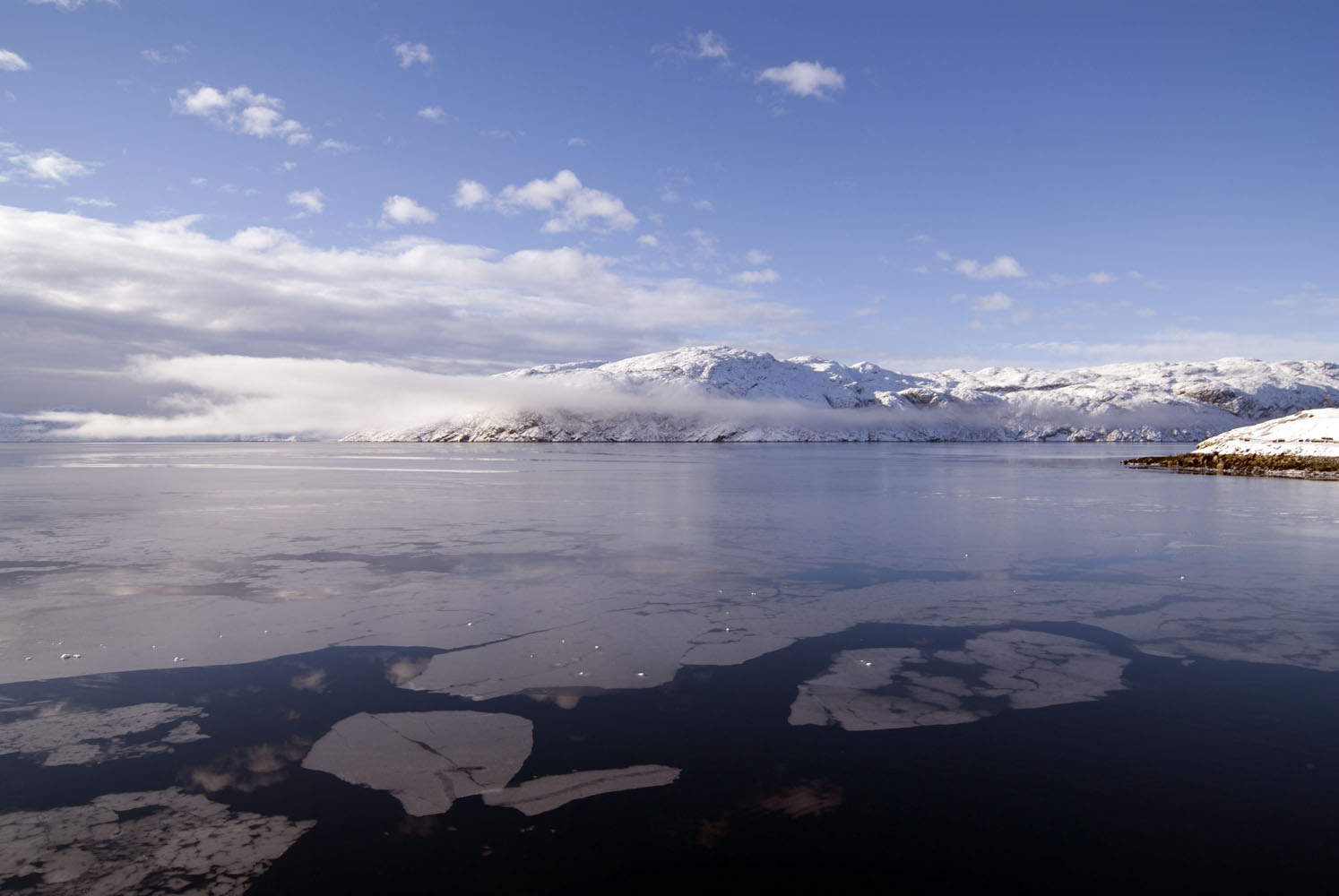
- Fjord icefloes, view from Kangilinnguit

- Location within Greenland
- Coordinates: 61°14′00″N 48°05′55″W
- State: Kingdom of Denmark
- Constituent country: Greenland
- Municipality: Sermersooq

Population (2017)
  - Total: 3
- Time zone: UTC-03
- Postal Code: 3905 Nuussuaq

Kangilinnguit Heliport
- IATA: JGR; ICAO: BGGD

Summary
- Airport type: Military
- Elevation AMSL: 95 ft (29 m)
- Interactive map of Kangilinnguit Heliport

Helipads
Number	Length		Surface
Number	m	ft	Surface
1	45 × 40	147 × 131	Asphalt

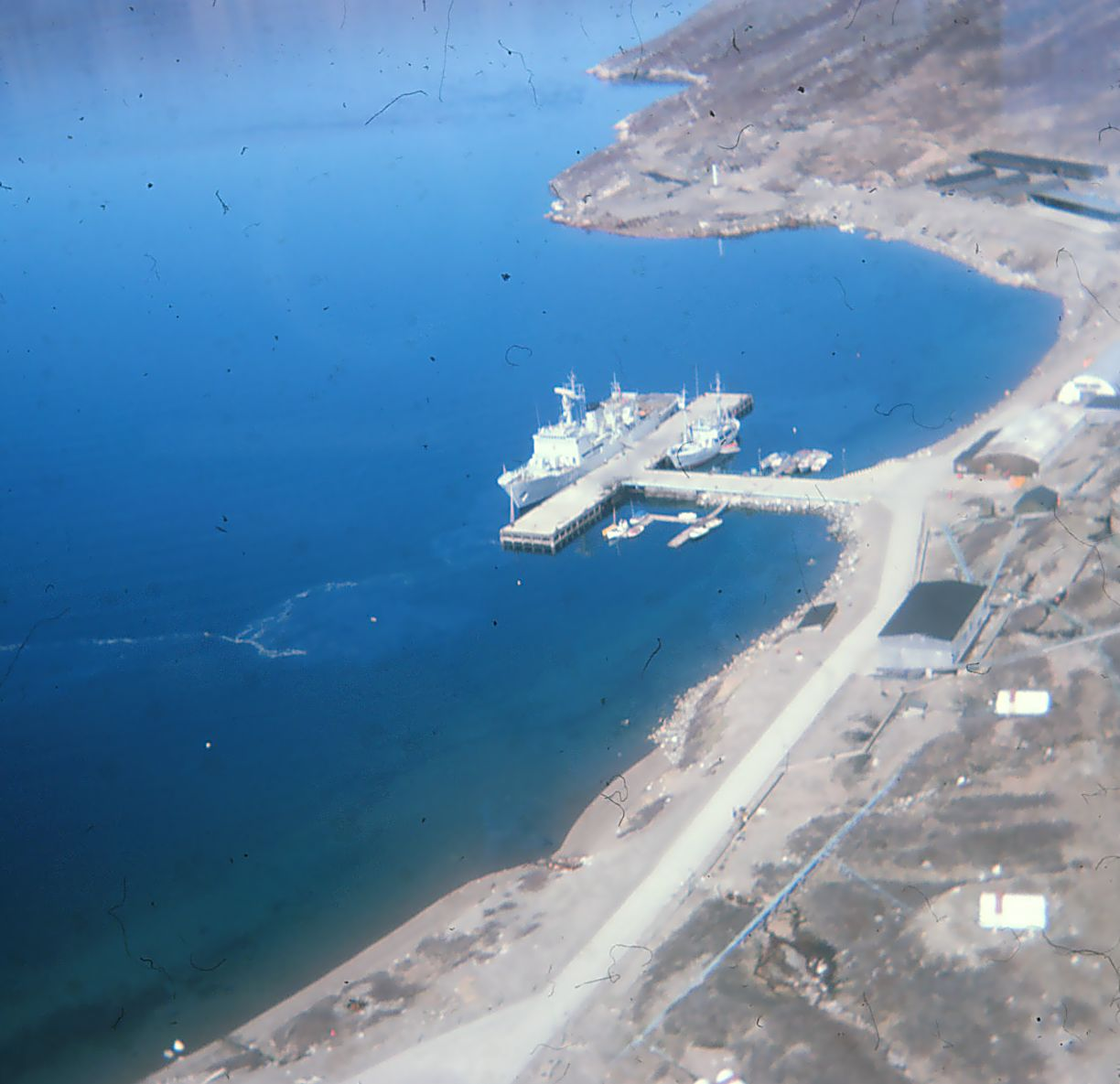
Kangilinnguit, 1977.

Kangilinnguit (Danish: Grønnedal), is a Danish military outpost and location of a former Danish Naval base attached to the Island Command Greenland in the Sermersooq municipality, located at the mouth of Arsuk Fjord in southwestern Greenland. In 2012–2014, Kangilinnguit was closed and residual military functions moved to Nuuk. In 2017, the station became staffed again by three Danish soldiers.

Kangilinnguit and Ivittuut are connected by a road, which is roughly 5 km (3 mi) long.

For the former U.S. Naval Operating Facility there, see Bluie West Seven.

== History ==
Kangilinnguit was founded as "Green Valley" by the United States Navy during the Second World War to protect the highly strategic cryolite quarry in the former settlement of Ivittuut. The U.S. Navy turned the base over to the Danish Navy in August 1951. During the early years of the Cold War, the base was used by anti-submarine warfare ships of NATO, which tracked Soviet Navy submarines in the North Atlantic.

Since at least the mid-1990s, the Danish Navy has proposed saving money on the headquarters staff of Island Command Greenland out of isolated Grønnedal by relocating most of the 65 members either to the Greenlandic capital at Nuuk or bringing them back to Aarhus in Jutland. However, the Greenlandic government has successfully lobbied to keep the command intact in order to boost the local economy.

The settlement had 160 inhabitants in 2010, some of which were civilian contractors.

=== Closure and partial retention ===
Under the terms of the "2010-2014 Danish Defence Agreement" approved by the Danish parliament on 24 June 2009, the Greenland Command absorbed the (nearly defunct) Faroe Island Command. The combined command was placed in Nuuk under the name of "Arctic Command". As a result, in 2012, Kangilinnguit was closed and residual military functions moved to Nuuk, the capital of Greenland. The last facilities, a communications site, was decommissioned in 2014.

Initially the Sermersooq municipality planned to take over the town, but did not happen. The town was later put up for sale, but this was also cancelled following security concerns as a result of an attempt by China to purchase the former naval base and town site. The buildings were to be demolished, but were spared as the Danish military considered reopening the base in 2016. In 2016, the Chinese mining company General Nice Group offered to buy the base, but the Danish government rejected the offer due to security concerns.

In 2017, three Danish soldiers were deployed to maintain the site.

== Population ==
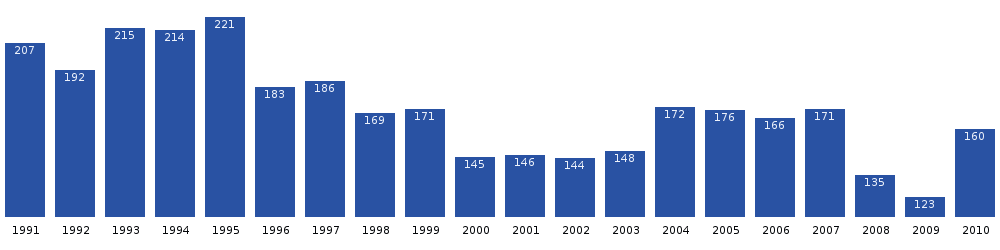
Kangilinnguit population growth dynamics in the last two decades. Source: Statistics Greenland
