= Ivittuut =

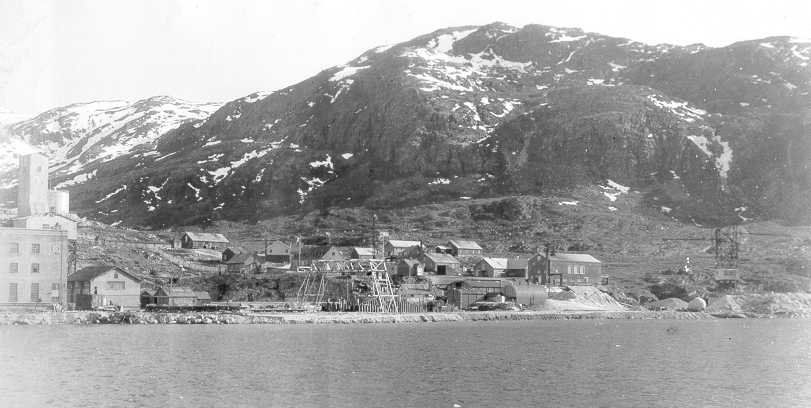
- The cryolite mine in Ivittuut in the summer of 1940

- Location within Greenland
- Coordinates: 61°12′30″N 48°10′10″W
- State: Kingdom of Denmark
- Constituent country: Greenland
- Municipality: Sermersooq
- Abandoned: 1980s
- Time zone: UTC-03

Ivittuut (formerly, Ivigtût; Greenlandic for "Grassy Place") is an abandoned mining town near Cape Desolation in southwestern Greenland, in the modern Sermersooq municipality near the former Norse Middle Settlement.

Ivittuut is one of the few places in the world so far discovered to have naturally occurring cryolite (Na_{3}AlF_{6}, sodium aluminum fluoride), an important agent in modern aluminum extraction.

== History ==
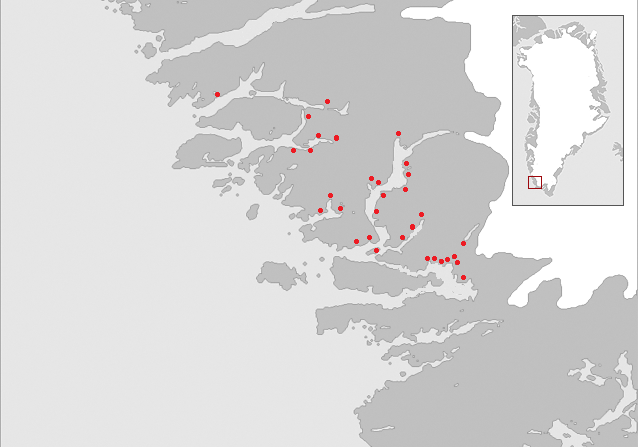
Map of the "Middle Settlement" of the Norse in medieval Greenland. Red dots indicate known Norse farm ruins.

The surrounding region was settled by about twenty farms of Norsemen, a district called the "Middle Settlement" by modern archaeologists from its placement between the larger Western and Eastern Settlements. It is the smallest and least well known of the three, and no written records of its residents survive, for which reasons it is believed to have been established last (and abandoned first) of the three. Investigations show a presence after 985 and with occupation continuing up to at least the 14th century.

The town's cryolite deposit was discovered in 1799, and the veins of silver-bearing lead surrounding it were mined by the British engineer J.W. Tayler before the silver content was found to be too low to make the operation viable. Danish engineers began mining the cryolite itself in 1859, and in 1864 the Danish Kriolit Mine og Handels Selskabet was granted a monopoly on its extraction. These early mines simply processed the cryolite for its direct aluminum content and for sale to the Pennsylvania Salt Manufacturing Company, which used it to create caustic soda.

The 1884 establishment of the Hall-Heroult process, which depends on the rare cryolite but dramatically improved the extraction of aluminum from bauxite ore, increased the deposit's importance. The Ivittuut mining operations were a major factor in the American occupation of Greenland during World War II. The Kangilinnguit naval base was founded as Bluie West Seven ("Green Valley") by the United States Navy during the Second World War to protect the highly strategic cryolite quarry in Ivittuut.

After World War II, the cryolite was mined by the Danish firm Kryolitselskabet Øresund, which helped fund the establishment of Grønlandsfly, today's Air Greenland.

Cryolite was eventually synthesized, reducing the importance of the mine. The mine ran empty, but production was proceeded using earlier 'waste rock'. The mine was finally shut down in 1987. The community was abandoned soon after.

In 1924, it was a stopping place for the first aerial circumnavigation, during which new engines were installed in two American biplane aircraft.

== Climate ==
Ivittuut holds the record for Greenland's highest recorded temperature of 30.1 °C (86.2 °F), recorded on 23 June 1915. The lowest recorded temperature was −28.9 °C (−20.0 °F) in February.

Ivittuut has a tundra climate (ET) bordering on a subarctic climate (Dfc), with July having an average of 9.8 °C (49.6 °F). Summertime temperatures are cool with chilly nights, and wintertime temperatures are very cold with frigid nights.

Climate data for Ivittuut
Month	Jan	Feb	Mar	Apr	May	Jun	Jul	Aug	Sep	Oct	Nov	Dec	Year
Record high °C (°F)	13.3 (55.9)	14.4 (57.9)	15.6 (60.1)	16.1 (61.0)	23.3 (73.9)	30.1 (86.2)	23.3 (73.9)	21.7 (71.1)	21.1 (70.0)	19.4 (66.9)	17.8 (64.0)	15.6 (60.1)	30.1 (86.2)
Mean daily maximum °C (°F)	−4.4 (24.1)	−3.3 (26.1)	−0.6 (30.9)	3.3 (37.9)	8.3 (46.9)	12.2 (54.0)	13.9 (57.0)	12.8 (55.0)	8.3 (46.9)	4.4 (39.9)	0.0 (32.0)	−2.8 (27.0)	4.3 (39.7)
Mean daily minimum °C (°F)	−11.1 (12.0)	−11.1 (12.0)	−8.9 (16.0)	−4.4 (24.1)	0.6 (33.1)	3.9 (39.0)	5.6 (42.1)	5.0 (41.0)	2.2 (36.0)	−1.7 (28.9)	−5.6 (21.9)	−8.9 (16.0)	−2.9 (26.8)
Record low °C (°F)	−27.8 (−18.0)	−28.9 (−20.0)	−27.2 (−17.0)	−20.6 (−5.1)	−10.6 (12.9)	−2.2 (28.0)	0.6 (33.1)	−1.7 (28.9)	−5.6 (21.9)	−12.8 (9.0)	−17.8 (0.0)	−26.7 (−16.1)	−28.9 (−20.0)
Average precipitation mm (inches)	83.8 (3.30)	66.0 (2.60)	86.4 (3.40)	63.5 (2.50)	88.9 (3.50)	81.3 (3.20)	78.7 (3.10)	94.0 (3.70)	149.9 (5.90)	144.8 (5.70)	116.8 (4.60)	78.7 (3.10)	1,132.8 (44.6)
Source: Sistema de Clasificación Bioclimática Mundial

== Transport ==
Ivittuut and the Kangilinnguit military base are connected by a road, which is roughly 5 km (3 mi) long.

== See also ==
- History of Greenland
