= Cape Desolation =

Headland in southwest Greenland

Cape Desolation Killavaat Nuugaatsiaat (Greenlandic) Kap Desolation
- Cape
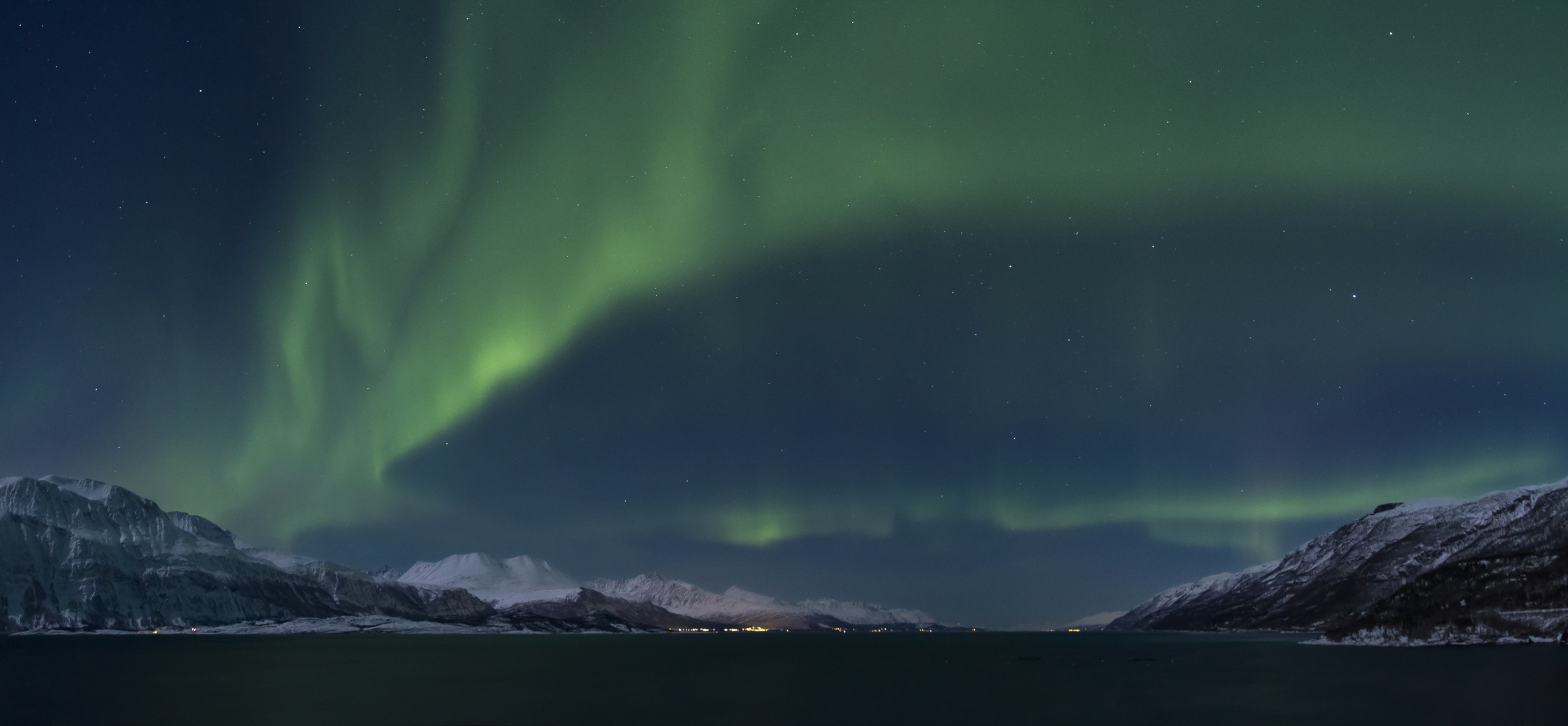
- Cape Desolation with the Northern Lights

- Location within Greenland
- Coordinates: 60°44′02″N 48°10′26″W
- Location: Kujalleq, Greenland
- Water bodies: Labrador Sea

Area
  - Total: Arctic
- Elevation: 600

Cape Desolation (Greenlandic: Killavaat Nuugaatsiaat (Note: formerly spelled as Kitdlavât Nûgâtsiât), Danish: Kap Desolation), also known as 'Cape Brill', is a headland in southwest Greenland in the Kujalleq municipality.

== Geography ==
The cape is located 16.66 km to the west-north-west of Cape Thorvaldsen near the modern settlements of Arsuk and Ivittuut. The cape is in an impressive stack of jagged cliffs with the reddish crags of the Killavaat mountain range in the background. The Outer Kitsissut (Torstein Islands) lie 9.5 km west-north-west of the cape.
