= Arsuk =

Village in Greenland

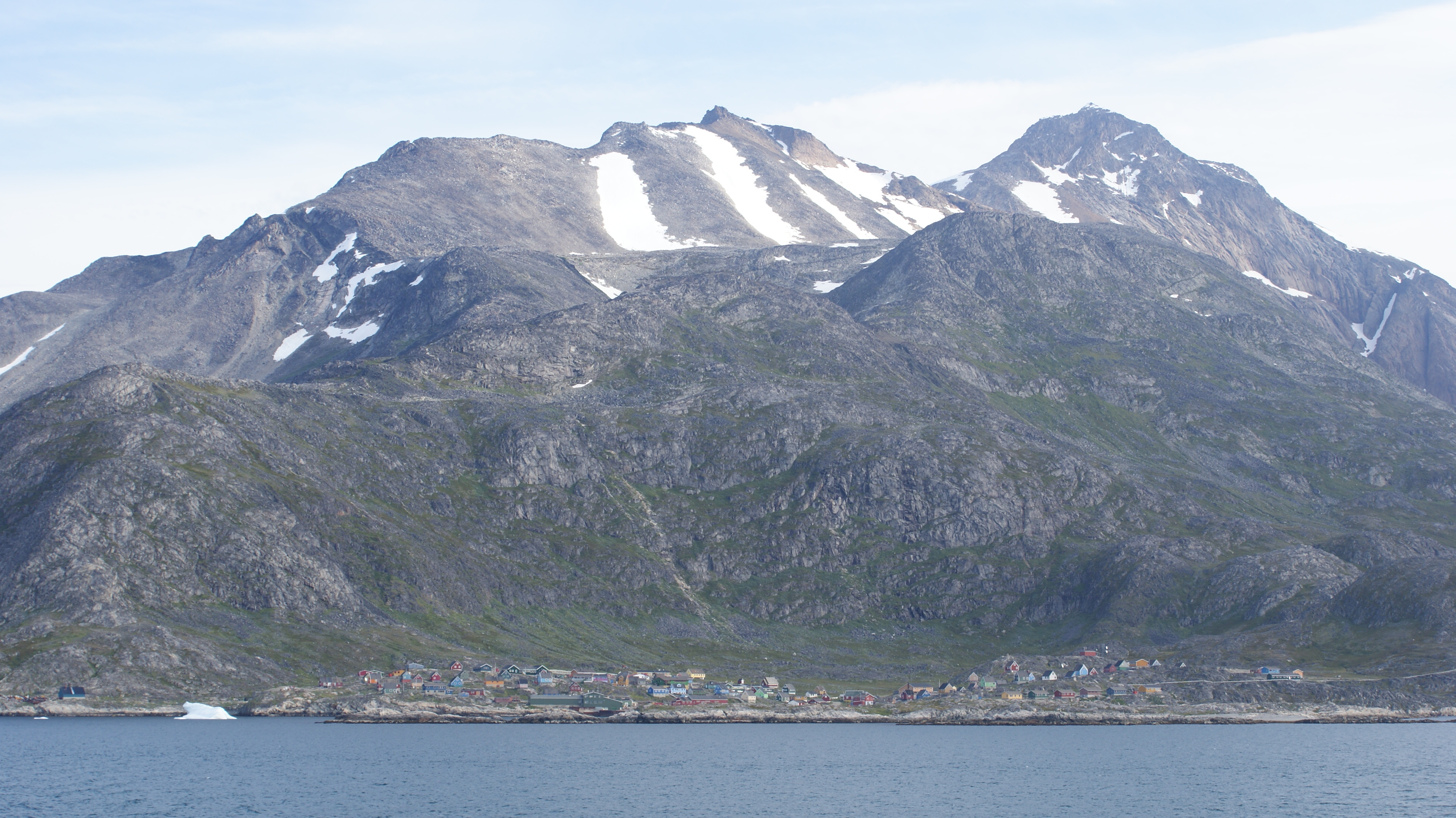
- Arsuk under the Kuunnaat mountain

- Location within Greenland
- Coordinates: 61°10′30″N 48°27′00″W
- State: Kingdom of Denmark
- Constituent country: Greenland
- Municipality: Sermersooq
- District: Paamiut
- First Settled: 1500 B.C.E.
- Founded: 1805

Government
  - Village leaders: Niels Peter Mikaelsen; Jørgen Christensen; Jonathan Rasmussen

Population (2025)
  - Total: 76
- Time zone: UTC−02:00 (Western Greenland Time)
  - Summer (DST): UTC−01:00 (Western Greenland Summer Time)
- Postal code: 3932 Arsuk

Arsuk is a village in the Sermersooq municipality in southwestern Greenland. It had 73 inhabitants in 2020. The name of the settlement means the beloved place in Greenlandic.

== Geography ==
Arsuk is located at the southern end of the Sermersooq municipality, on the coast of Labrador Sea near the mouth of the Arsuk Fjord in the southeast. It is north of Cape Desolation, where the coastline of southwestern Greenland turns to the east approximately 30 km (18.6 mi) to the south of the settlement at the wide mouth of Alanngorsuaq Fjord. The 1,418 m (4,652.2 ft) Kuunnaat mountain rises on the mainland directly to the north of the village.

== History ==
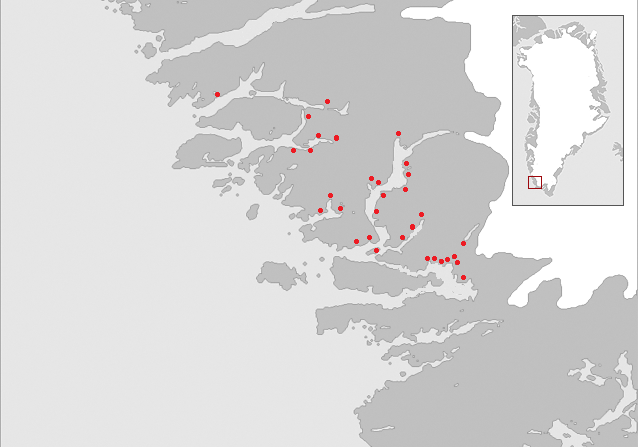
Map of the Middle Settlement of the Norse in medieval Greenland. No written documents of this settlement exist and the name Middle settlement is constructed by modern archaeologists. The red dots indicate known Norse farm ruins.

The region was first settled by people of the Saqqaq culture arriving from the north. The area was resettled by the Norse between the 10th and 14th centuries. In the 15th century, Thule people became the second southbound Inuit migration to the region; the area has been permanently settled since.

The discovery of cryolite in Ivittuut in the inner parts of Arsuk Fjord attracted the interest of the Danes during the colonial era, leading to the formal foundation of the settlement in 1805. The timber Lutheran church was built in 1830.

The mines closed in 1987, with the Ivittuut settlement abandoned soon thereafter, leaving Arsuk on the economic periphery despite its tourism potential.

== Transport ==
Arsuk is a port of call for the Arctic Umiaq Line coastal ship, linking the village with Paamiut in the north (6.5 hours), and Qaqortoq in the southeast (9.5 hours), both towns served by Air Greenland.

== Population ==
Most towns and settlements in southern Greenland have exhibited negative growth patterns during the 1990s and 2000s, with many settlements rapidly depopulating. Arsuk in particular saw population decline in almost every year during the period. It lost more than half of its population relative to the 1990 levels, over 10% relative to the 2000 levels. The sharp decline in the 1990s was due to the mine closure and loss of employment. The weak growth in the late 2000s and stabilization of the population level kept Arsuk from sharing the fate of Qassimiut, which lost more than two thirds of its population and is headed for abandonment, and that of Kangerluarsoruseq in the same municipality, which was abandoned in 2009.

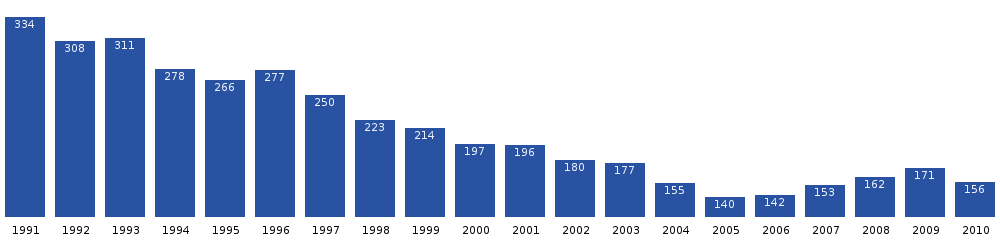
Arsuk population growth dynamics in the 1990s and 2000s. Source: Statistics Greenland
