= Cape Atholl =

Peninsula in Avannaata, Greenland

Cape Atholl Kap Atholl, Kangaarasuk
- Cape
- Location within Greenland
- Coordinates: 76°23′N 69°38′W
- Location: NW Greenland
- Water bodies: Bylot Sound; Baffin Bay

Area
  - Total: Arctic
- Elevation: 230 metres (755 feet)

Cape Atholl (Danish: Kap Atholl), also known as Kangaarasuk, is a headland in Northwest Greenland, Avannaata municipality.

This cape was named by Commander James Saunders, after Atholl, the class to which his ship HMS North Star belonged, during the winter 1849–50 in which he was frozen in the bay to the north and named landmarks in the area.

== History ==
Cape Atholl was a United States Coast Guard LORAN station in Northwest Greenland, south of Pituffik Space Base. It was established in 1954 and disestablished in 1975. The station was located at Quaratit, about 11 kilometres (7 miles) southeast of Cape Atholl proper.

- Latitude: 76°18'56.62"N
- Longitude: 69°21'21.03"W

== Geography ==
Cape Atholl is located in the mainland, in the eastern shore of Bylot Sound, Baffin Bay. It rises at the southern end of the mouth of Wolstenholme Fjord and opposite the eastern end of Wolstenholme Island.

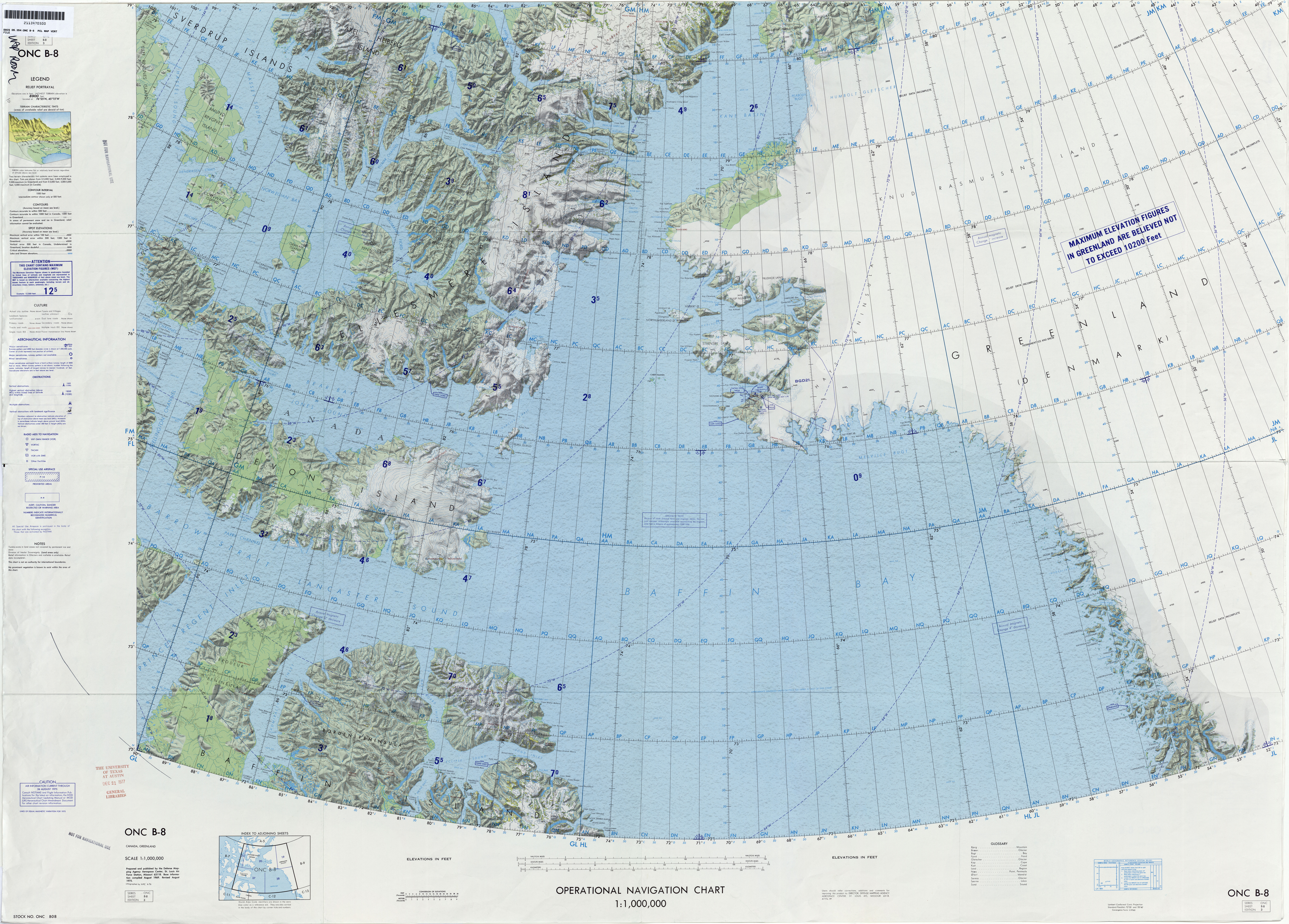
Map of Northwestern Greenland

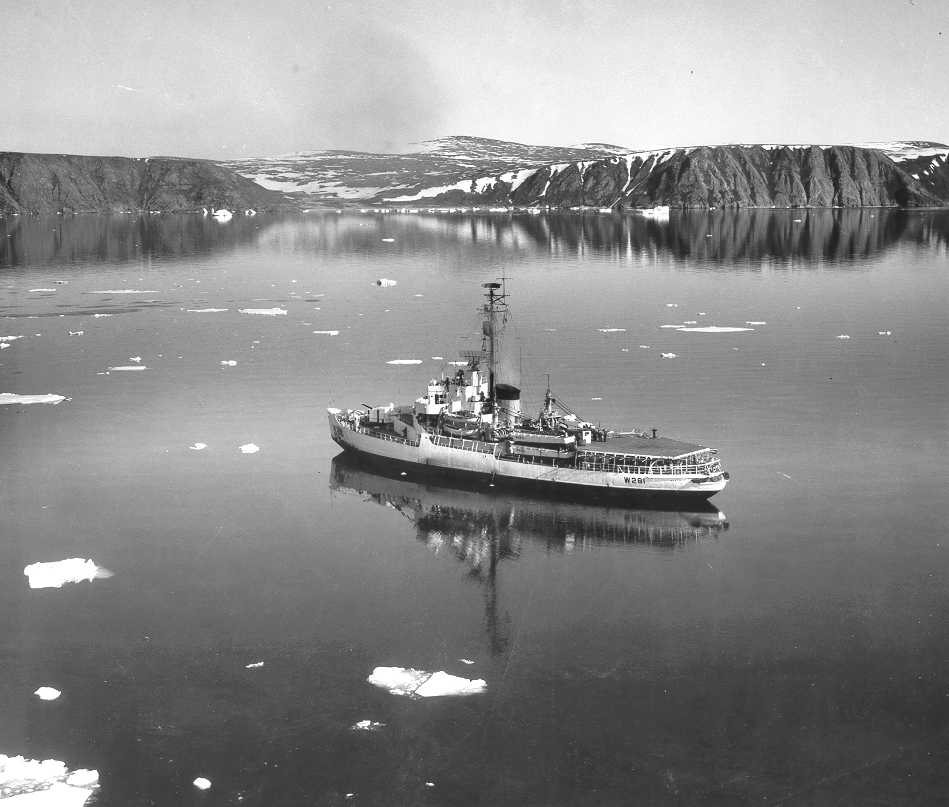
USCGC Westwind near Cape Atholl, Greenland, returning from Arctic cruise (1964).
