= Wolstenholme Island =

Island in Baffin Bay, in Avannaata, Greenland

Native name: Qeqertarssuaq
- Location within Greenland

Geography
- Location: Baffin Bay, Greenland
- Coordinates: 76.43778°N 70.00583°W
- Highest elevation: 259 m (850 ft)

Administration
- Greenland
- Municipality: Avannaata

Wolstenholme Island (Greenlandic: Qeqertarssuaq) is an island in Baffin Bay, in Avannaata municipality, off northwestern Greenland.

The island lies west of the Bylot Sound off Cape Atholl in the southern shore of the mouth of Wolstenholme Fjord, south of Saunders Island. It is smaller than the latter and made of gneiss.

== History ==
Under Commander James Saunders HMS North Star sailed to the Arctic in 1849 in the spring on a venture to search and resupply Captain Sir James Clark Ross' expedition, who in turn had sailed in 1848 trying to locate the whereabouts of Sir John Franklin's expedition. Failing to find Franklin or Ross, Saunders's mission aboard the North Star consisted in depositing stores along several named areas of the Canadian Arctic coast and returning to England before the onset of winter. However, James Saunders's ship's progress was hindered by large amounts of ice in Melville Bay and it finally became trapped by ice off the coast of northwestern Greenland in North Star Bay. A paper left by Saunders in a cairn reads thus:

This paper is placed here to certify, that H.M.S, North Star was beset, at the east side of Melville Bay, on the 29th of July, last year, and gradually drifted from day to day, until, on the 26th of September, we found ourselves abreast of Wolstenholme Island; when perceiving the ice a little; more loose, and the Sound perfectly clear, we made all plain sail, and pressed her through it, anchoring in the lower part of the Sound that evening, and arrived in the Bay on the 1st of October, where she remained throughout the winter.

During the winter 1849–50 Saunders named numerous landmarks in that area, including Wolstenholme Island, while wintering in the frozen bay.

Adam Beck, John Ross' Inuit interpreter during his 1850 Third Arctic expedition, had told a grisly story —reportedly heard by him from Greenlandic Inuit— about a massacre of Franklin's men on Wolstenholme Island. Nevertheless, a thorough search of the island yielded no evidence and Adam Beck's story was discarded.

Wolstenholme Fjord off North Star Bay was the site of a Cold War nuclear accident when a B-52 bomber carrying four thermonuclear bombs crashed, spreading contaminated material over the area. A location south of Wolstenholme Island served as background reference.

== Images ==
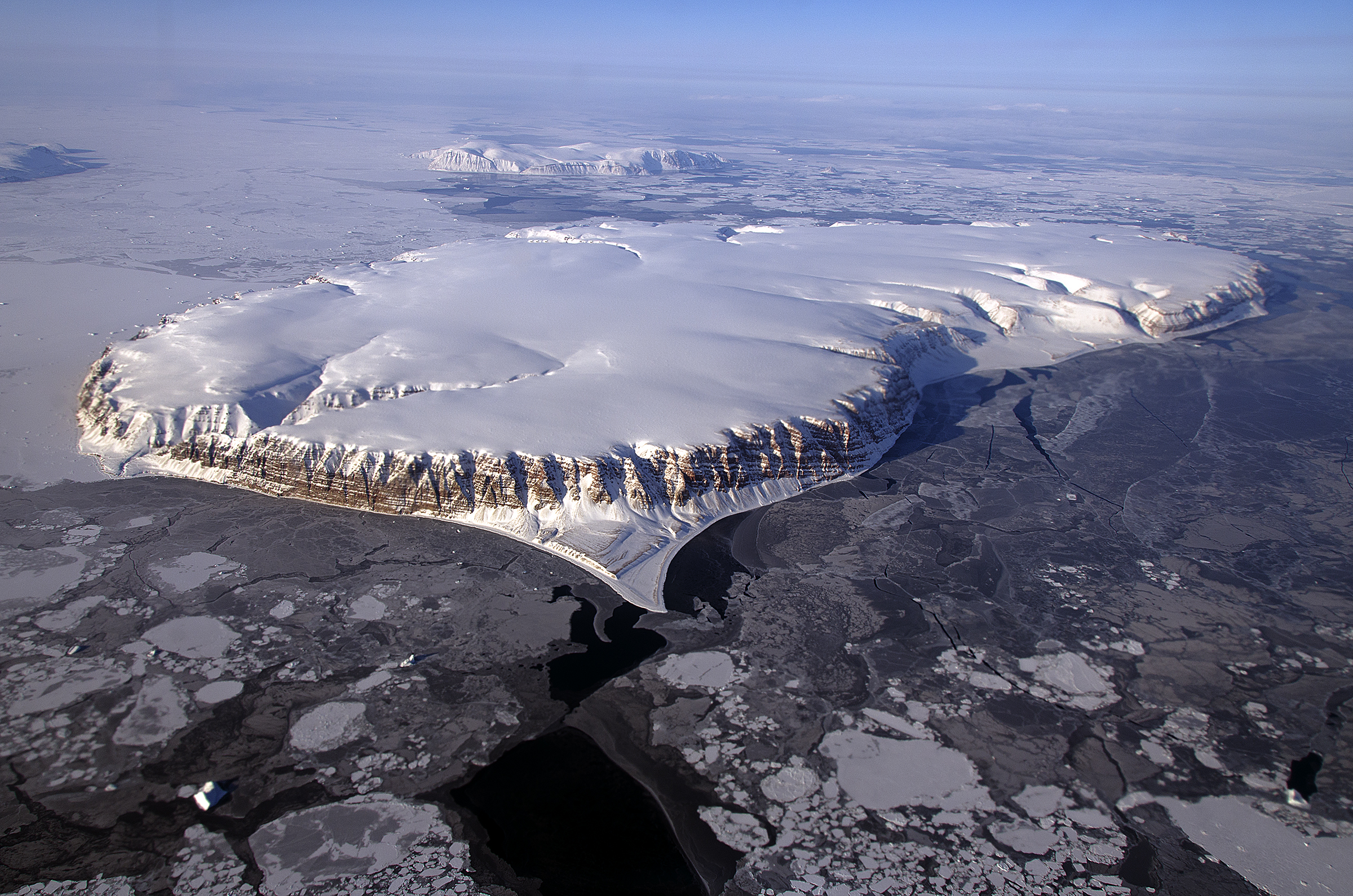
View of Saunders Island in the foreground and Wolstenholme Island in the background.

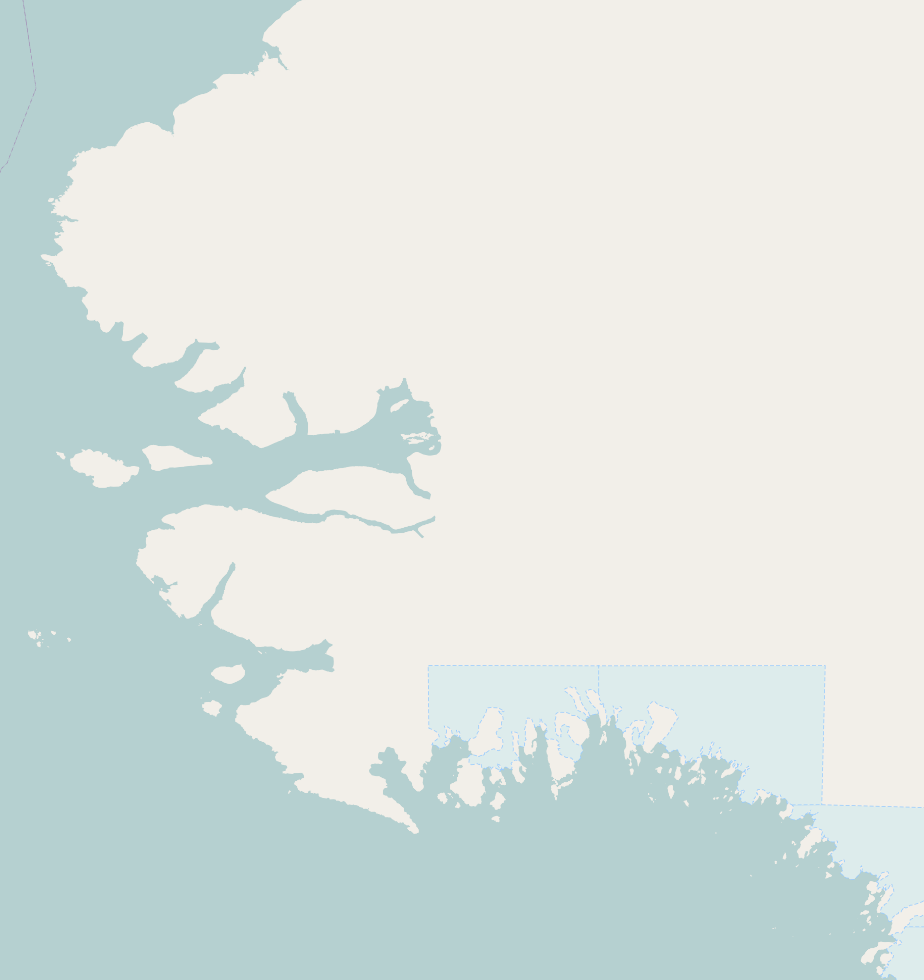
Location of Wolstenholme Island

== See also ==
- List of islands of Greenland
- 70th meridian west
