= 110th meridian =

110th meridian may refer to:

- 110th meridian east, a line of longitude east of the Greenwich Meridian
- 110th meridian west, a line of longitude west of the Greenwich Meridian

110th meridian west	110th meridian east
