= 70th meridian =

70th meridian may refer to:

- 70th meridian east, a line of longitude east of the Greenwich Meridian
- 70th meridian west, a line of longitude west of the Greenwich Meridian

70th meridian west	70th meridian east
