= Bylot Sound =

Sound in the North Star Bay, Avannaata municipality, northwest Greenland

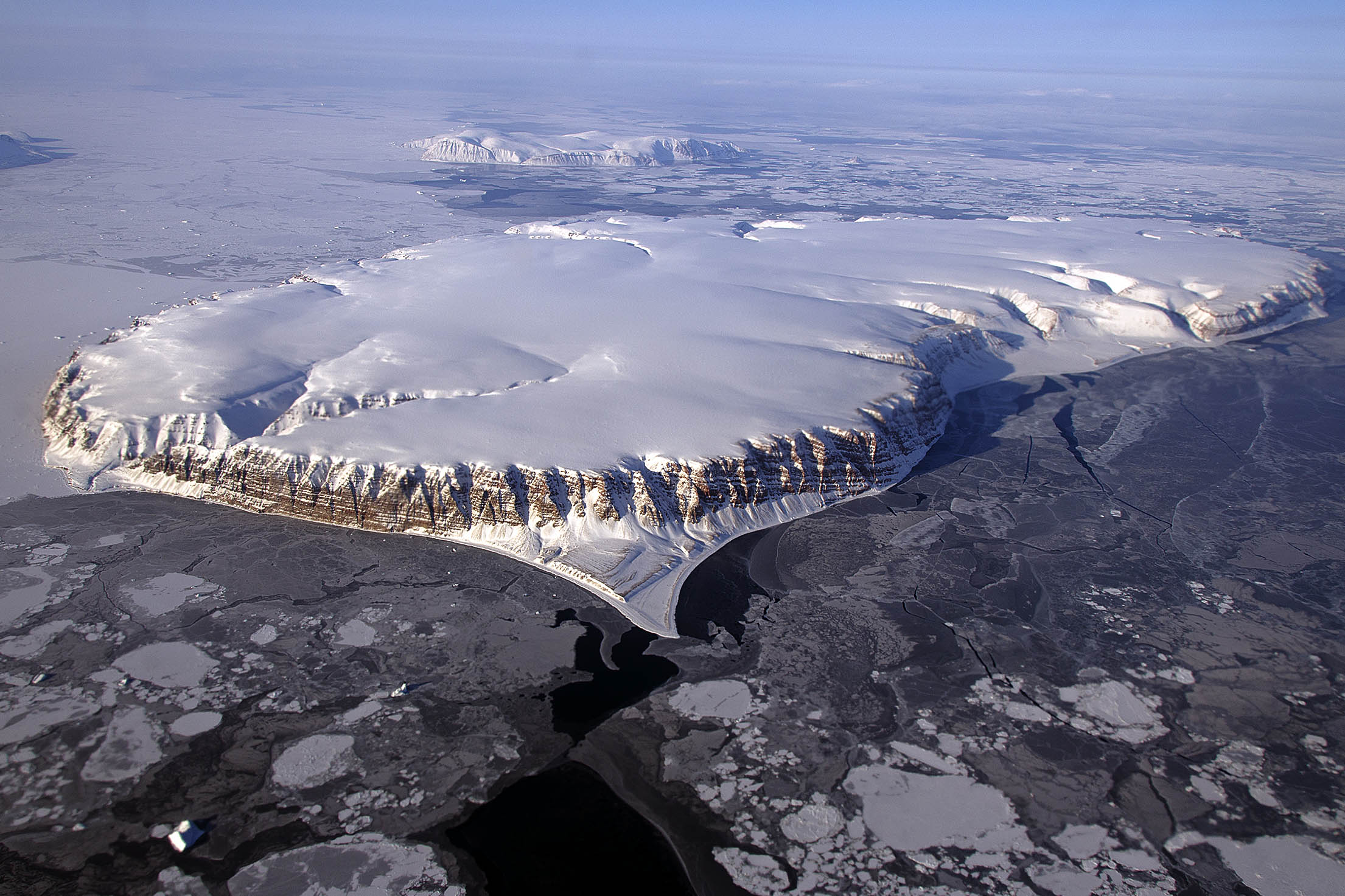
- Saunders Island with Bylot Sound on the left and Wolstenholme Island in the background

- Location within Greenland
- Location: Greenland; between Saunders Island and the mainland
- Coordinates: 76°24′51″N 69°44′46″W
- Part of: Arctic Ocean
- Ocean/sea sources: Baffin Bay
- Basin countries: Greenland
- Max. length: 37 km (23 mi)
- Max. width: 16 km (9.9 mi)
- Frozen: Most of the year
- Islands: Saunders Island and Wolstenholme Island
- Settlements: Pituffik Space Base

Bylot Sound is the strait between the mainland of Greenland and Saunders Island and Wolstenholme Island in the Avannaata municipality, northwest Greenland. North Star Bay is the eastern part of the sound.

== Geography ==
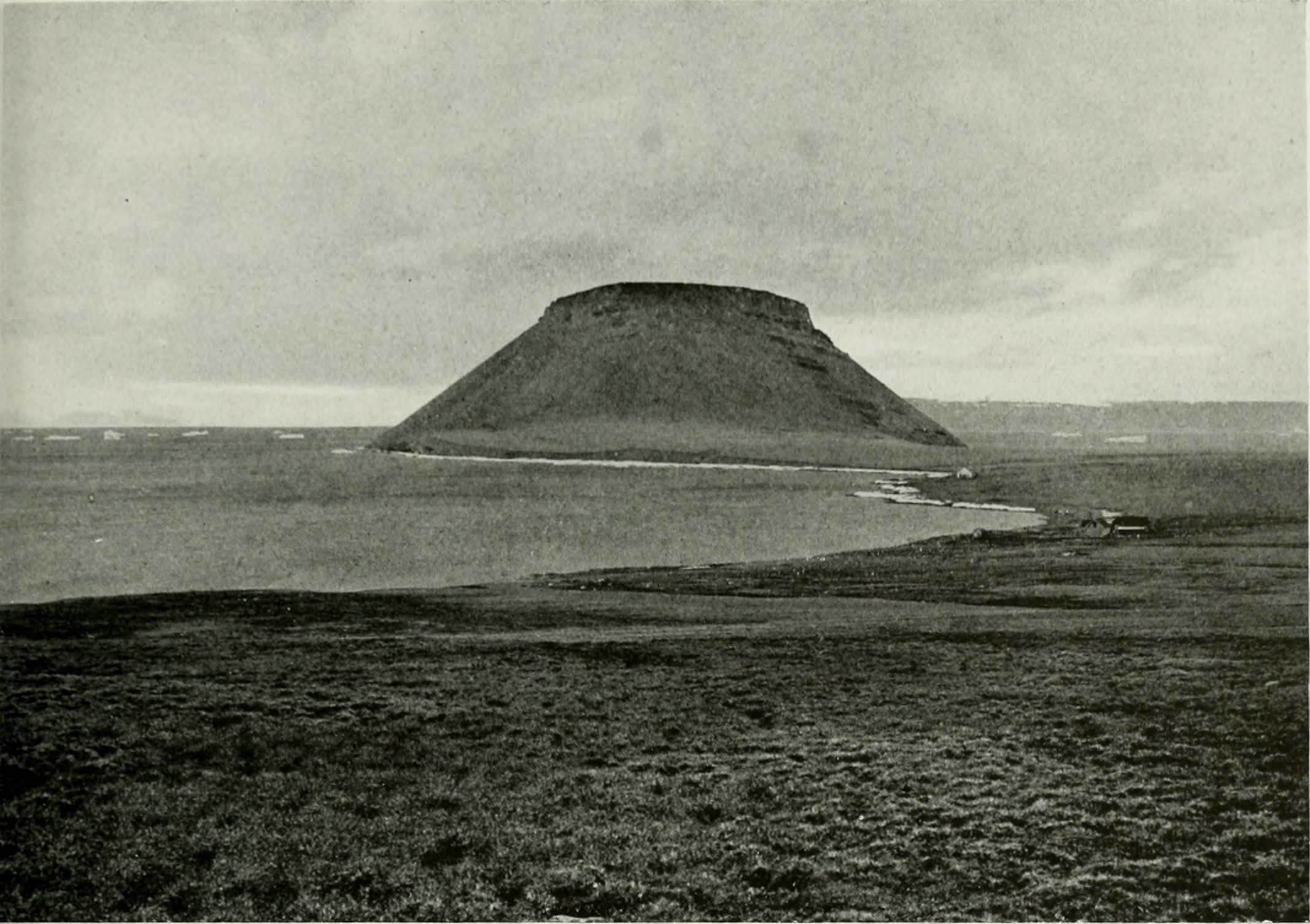
Mount Dundas and Thule trading station, photographed by Edmund Otis Hovey in 1916 or 1917

The strait separates Saunders Island and Wolstenholme Island from the Greenland mainland. Its minimum width is 6 km (3.7 mi), between Wolstenholme Island and Cape Atholl, the mainland point at its southwestern end. A peninsula that ends in Mount Dundas is at the eastern end of the sound and of North Star Bay.

The Inughuit settlements of Narsaarsuk and Pituffik were on the shores of the sound, but have been abandoned. The United States' Pituffik Space Base near the eastern end is now the only inhabited place.

== History ==
This strait was named after 17th-century English navigator Robert Bylot, who led two expeditions to find the Northwest Passage.

HMS North Star under Commander James Saunders got frozen-in in the sound in the winter of 1849–1850, during an Arctic expedition to search for and resupply Captain Sir James Clark Ross' venture, which itself had sailed in 1848 trying to locate the whereabouts of Sir John Franklin's expedition. While his ship was trapped by ice Saunders named numerous landmarks in that area.

In 1968 a B-52 bomber carrying four thermonuclear bombs caught fire and crashed on the ice of Bylot Sound while trying to make an emergency landing at Pituffik Space Base (then Thule Air Base), spreading contaminated material over the whole area.
