= Pituffik =

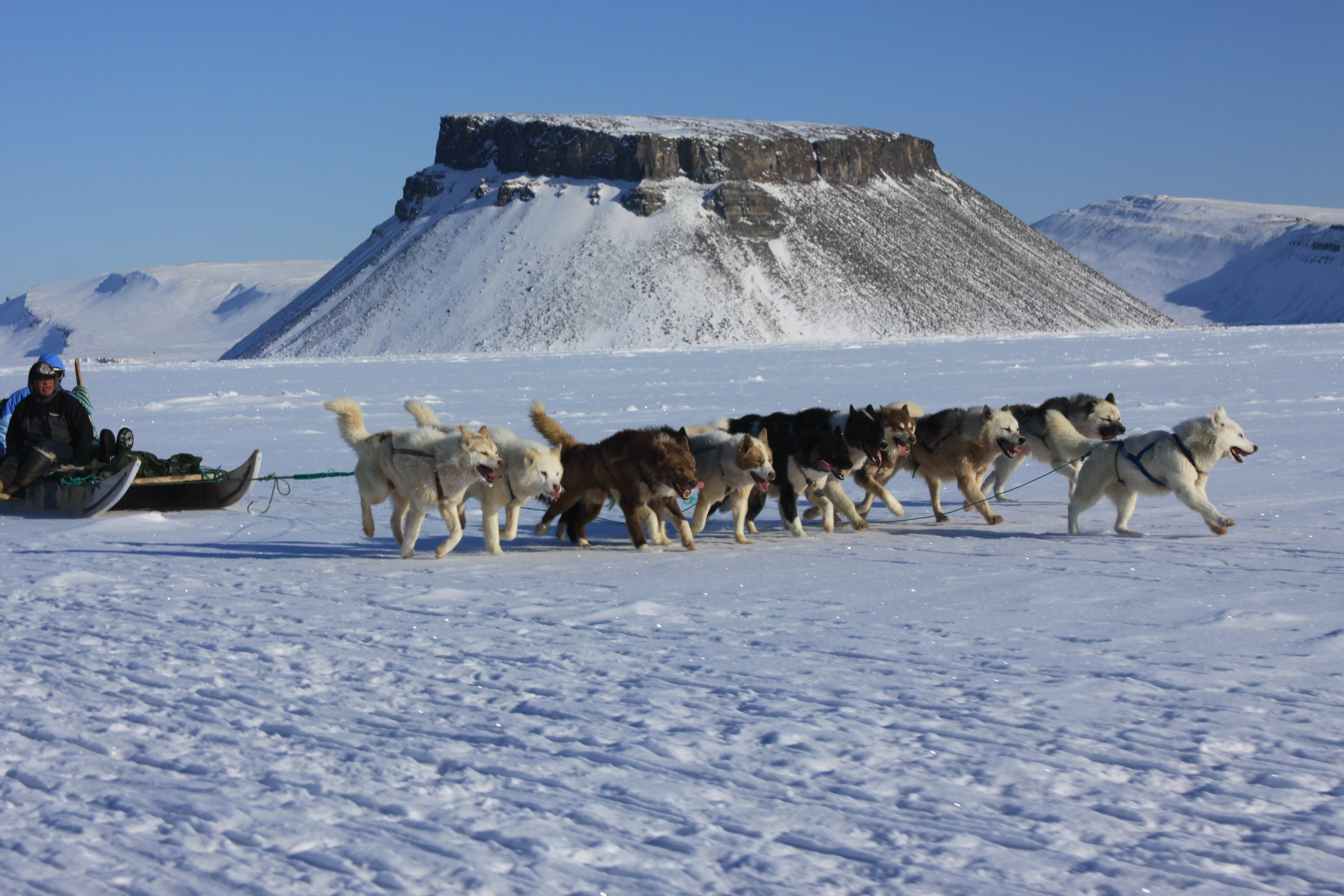
- A dog sled race at Pituffik, with Mount Dundas in the background

- Location within Greenland
- Coordinates: 76°32′N 68°45′W
- State: Kingdom of Denmark
- Constituent country: Greenland
- Municipality: Avannaata
- Relocated: 1953
- Time zone: UTC-2:00 (Western Greenland Time)
  - Summer (DST): UTC-1:00 (Western Greenland Summer Time)

Pituffik (meaning 'mooring place, place to tie something') is a former Inughuit settlement in North Star Bay, near Mount Dundas at the eastern end of Bylot Sound in northern Greenland. It was located on the plain that is now occupied by the runway of the U.S. Pituffik Space Base, formerly Thule Air Base. The Inughuit inhabitants were relocated to the present-day town of Qaanaaq. The relocation and the fallout from the 1968 Thule Air Base B-52 crash in the vicinity are a contentious issue in Greenland's relations with Denmark and the United States.

== Exploration ==
Pituffik was a hunting village of the Inughuit, the northern Greenlandic Inuit. The Qaanaaq region of northern Greenland in which it is located was inhabited for several thousand years, first settled 4,500 years ago by Paleo-Eskimo peoples migrating from the Canadian Arctic.

Commander James Saunders of the Royal Navy explored the area while wintering on HMS North Star in 1849–50 after being trapped by ice in the sound.

== Military control ==
=== Forced relocation ===
In 1951 the United States was given permission to build Thule Air Base at the site of the settlement. Between 1952 and May 1953, all residents of Pituffik and nearby Dundas (Uummannaq) were forcibly relocated 130 km (81 mi) north to the new town of Qaanaaq, commonly known at the time as "New Qaanaaq" or "New Thule", where people were forced to live in tents from May 1953 until November of the same year, well into the polar winter, while the 27 new houses were constructed for them. The total cost of the relocation amounted to 8.65 million Danish krone (DKK), or 1.52 million US dollars, with more than half paid by the U.S.

The airbase is not part of any civilian municipality of Greenland, but an enclave within Greenland, outside of its jurisdiction. Within Greenland the airbase location, and the airbase itself, continue to be referred to as Pituffik, in memory of the old settlement. Access to the site is restricted, with travellers bound for Thule Air Base required to apply for access permit from either Rigsombudsmanden in Nuuk (residents of Greenland), or the Danish Foreign Ministry (all others). Failure to present the permit during check-in results in denial of boarding. The same rules apply for transfers at Pituffik, including a stopover on the way from Qaanaaq to Savissivik, the southernmost settlement of northern Greenland, on the shore of Melville Bay.

=== Plutonium contamination ===
Radioactive plutonium from the 1968 bomber crash contaminated the nearby ancient hunting grounds, affecting the livelihoods of the region's inhabitants. There is evidence of hairless fur seals, and muskoxen with deformed hooves; the pollution remains a contentious issue between Greenland, Denmark, and the United States.

=== Legal action over civilian relocations ===
While the protection of Greenland offered by the airbase is not disputed, the relocation of the 1950s remains a controversial issue in Greenland more than half a century later, with ongoing demands for land reclamation being proposed by Greenlandic politicians. The current Government of Greenland does not have influence over the continued existence of the airbase at the site, as foreign policy remains the prerogative of the Government of Denmark. From the mid-1980s onwards, the then-Greenland Home Rule government worked together with the Government of Denmark to resolve the social effects of the eviction. On 30 September 1986, Denmark and the U.S. agreed to reduce the area outside Greenland's jurisdiction to half of the original size. In 1997, the Danish government agreed to subsidize the construction of the Qaanaaq Airport (47 million DKK), in agreement with the Home Rule government.

On 28 November 2003, the Danish Supreme Court ruled on the relocation issue denying the residents of Qaanaaq the right to return to the former village in Pituffik. The Greenlanders, numbering 428 in the case, were represented by the Hingitaq 53 group. That decision was later appealed in the European Court of Human Rights. The Court unanimously declared the application inadmissible.

There has also been internal debate in Greenland concerning demands to force the airbase to pay lease fees for its use of the land.

The National Space Institute at the Technical University of Denmark operates the Thule Research Station at Pituffik, which is crewed up to two months a year.

== Climate ==
Pituffik experiences a tundra climate (Köppen: ET); with short, cool summers and long, frigid winters. Temperatures & precipitation are low year-round, but are somewhat higher during the summer.

Climate data for Pituffik (76°32′N 68°45′W, 77 m (253 ft) AMSL) (1961-2006 data)
Month	Jan	Feb	Mar	Apr	May	Jun	Jul	Aug	Sep	Oct	Nov	Dec	Year
Record high °C (°F)	0.7 (33.3)	1.0 (33.8)	1.2 (34.2)	4.5 (40.1)	11.2 (52.2)	13.8 (56.8)	15.6 (60.1)	14.3 (57.7)	9.4 (48.9)	7.0 (44.6)	4.4 (39.9)	1.9 (35.4)	15.6 (60.1)
Mean daily maximum °C (°F)	−21.9 (−7.4)	−22.1 (−7.8)	−21.2 (−6.2)	−12.7 (9.1)	−2.6 (27.3)	4.2 (39.6)	7.1 (44.8)	5.2 (41.4)	0.4 (32.7)	−6.3 (20.7)	−13.2 (8.2)	−17.8 (0.0)	−8.4 (16.9)
Daily mean °C (°F)	−23.9 (−11.0)	−24.6 (−12.3)	−23.7 (−10.7)	−15.3 (4.5)	−4.3 (24.3)	2.8 (37.0)	6.1 (43.0)	4.5 (40.1)	−1.5 (29.3)	−8.6 (16.5)	−14.3 (6.3)	−20.1 (−4.2)	−10.2 (13.6)
Mean daily minimum °C (°F)	−27.9 (−18.2)	−28.2 (−18.8)	−27.2 (−17.0)	−19.4 (−2.9)	−7.0 (19.4)	0.6 (33.1)	3.5 (38.3)	1.9 (35.4)	−4.1 (24.6)	−11.1 (12.0)	−18.9 (−2.0)	−23.6 (−10.5)	−13.4 (7.9)
Record low °C (°F)	−40.5 (−40.9)	−40.0 (−40.0)	−41.2 (−42.2)	−33.0 (−27.4)	−23.1 (−9.6)	−6.4 (20.5)	−3.0 (26.6)	−6.7 (19.9)	−15.4 (4.3)	−29.8 (−21.6)	−32.5 (−26.5)	−36.9 (−34.4)	−40.5 (−40.9)
Average precipitation mm (inches)	5.3 (0.21)	4.5 (0.18)	5.7 (0.22)	7.3 (0.29)	9.8 (0.39)	13.7 (0.54)	22.7 (0.89)	26.5 (1.04)	13.6 (0.54)	15.0 (0.59)	12.2 (0.48)	13.1 (0.52)	149.4 (5.88)
Average precipitation days (≥ 1.0 mm)	2.2	1.6	2.2	2.3	1.4	2.2	4.6	4.3	3.0	4.3	3.2	3.2	34.5
Average snowy days	4.0	4.0	3.8	3.5	3.9	2.3	1.1	1.5	4.8	6.4	5.7	5.3	48.0
Average relative humidity (%)	84.1	83.8	82.1	79.2	77.4	78.0	77.0	79.0	76.6	81.4	81.1	84.9	80.4
Source: Danish Meteorological Institute (1991-2006 data) (1961-1990 snow days)

== See also ==
- High Arctic relocation
- Diego Garcia, the civilian population was removed in the 1970s to create a US Airforce Base in this British Indian Ocean Territory atoll
