= Saunders Island (Greenland) =

Island in Baffin Bay in Avannaata, Greenland

Native name: Appat
- Location within Greenland

Geography
- Location: Baffin Bay, Greenland
- Coordinates: 76°34′N 69°50′W
- Area: 103 km^{2} (40 sq mi)
- Length: 15 km (9.3 mi)
- Width: 7 km (4.3 mi)
- Highest elevation: 391 m (1283 ft)

Administration
- Greenland
- Municipality: Avannaata

Demographics
- Population: uninhabited

Saunders Island (Greenlandic: Appat; Danish: Saunders Ø) is in Baffin Bay, and off North Star Bay, in the Avannaata municipality of northwest Greenland. The island is named after Commander James Saunders of the British Royal Navy.

== Geography ==
The island lies off the southern shore of the mouth of Wolstenholme Fjord, north of Wolstenholme Island. Geologically it is composed of stratified rock. It is the largest island at the mouth of the fjord, flat-topped and with steep sides, with a landspit in the northeast. Its highest point is 391 m (1,283 ft). The strait between the islands and the mainland is Bylot Sound.

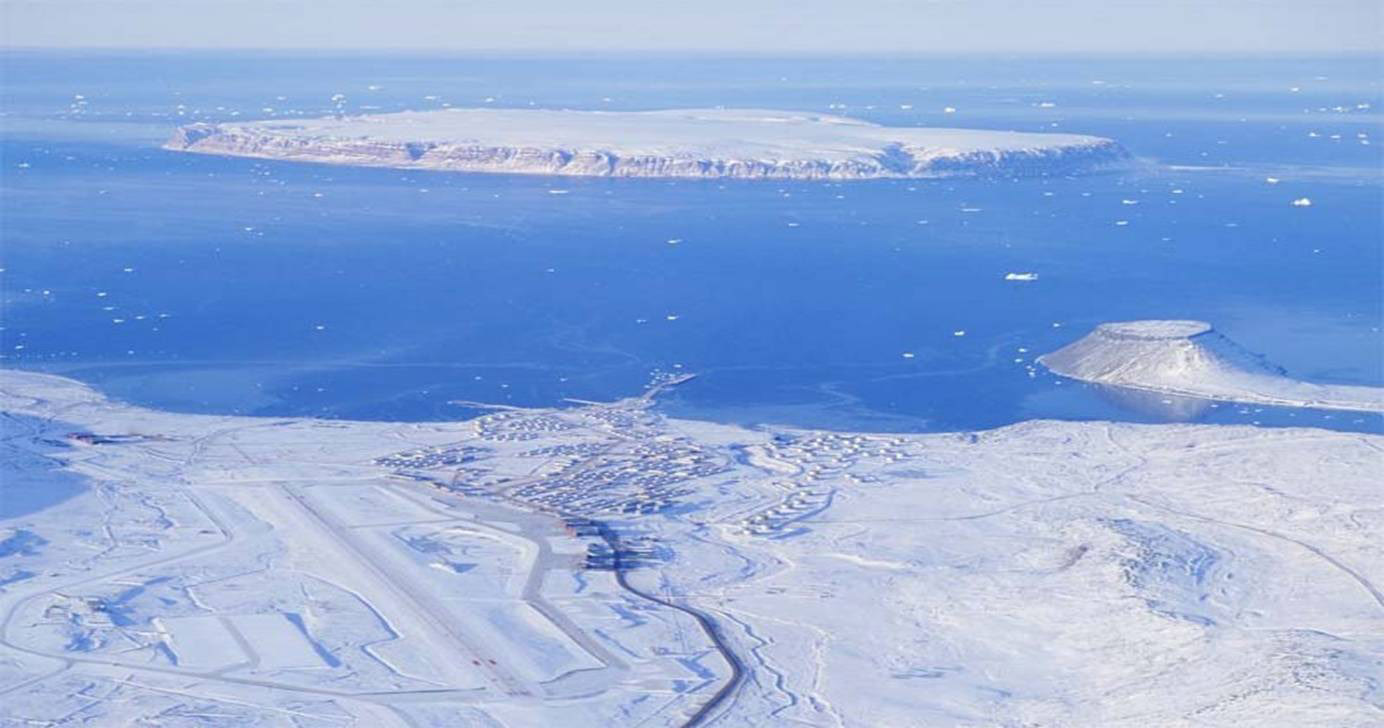
North Star Bay with Pituffik Space Base in the foreground, Saunders Island in the background and Mount Dundas on the right

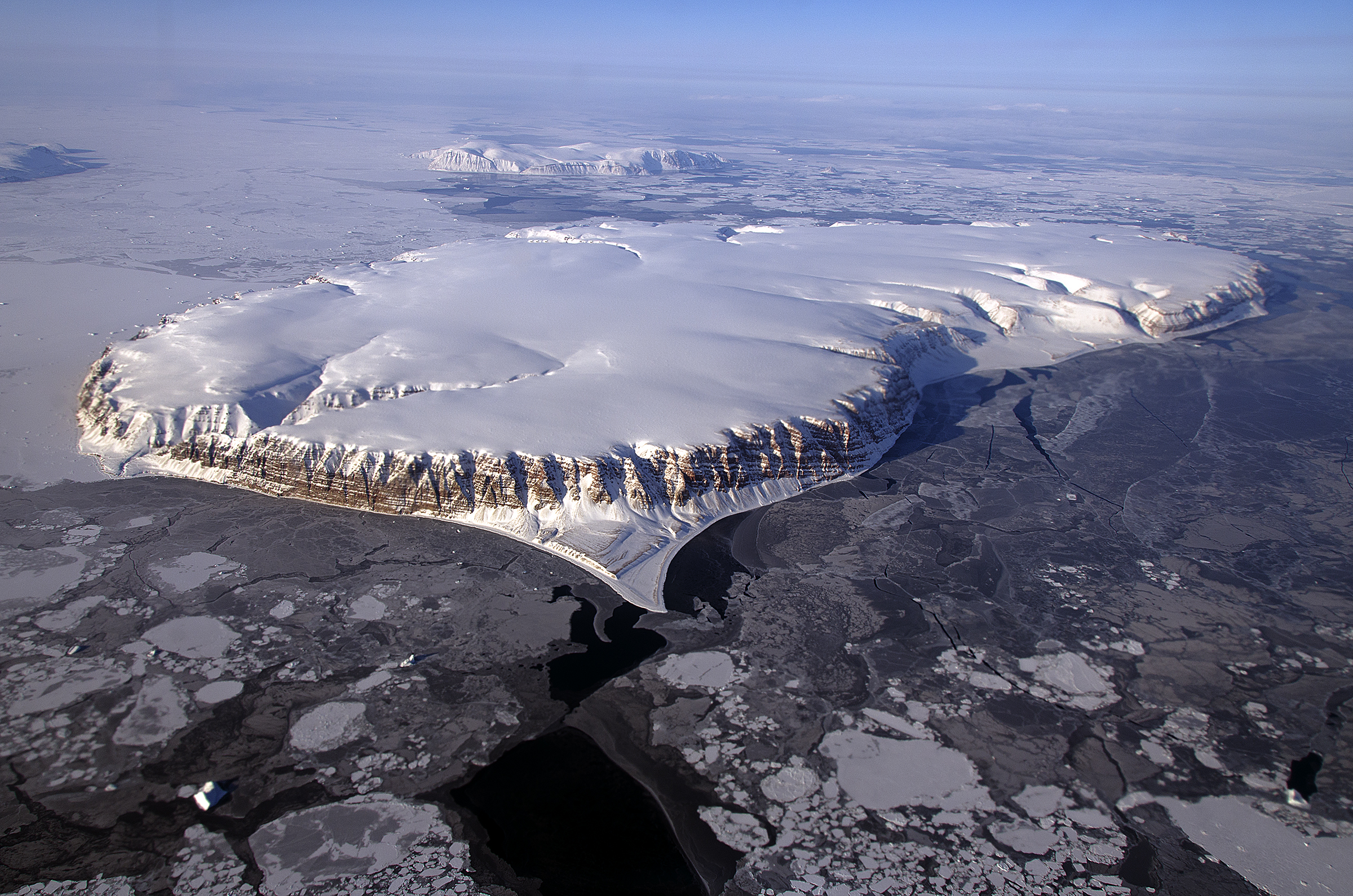
Saunders Island with Bylot Sound on the left and Wolstenholme Island in the background

== History ==
Under Commander James Saunders, HMS North Star sailed to the Arctic in 1849 in the spring on a venture to search and resupply Captain Sir James Clark Ross' expedition, who in turn had sailed in 1848 trying to locate the whereabouts of Sir John Franklin's expedition.

Failing to find Franklin or Ross, Saunders's mission aboard North Star consisted in depositing stores along several named areas of the Canadian Arctic coast and returning to England before the onset of winter. However, James Saunders's ship became trapped by ice off the coast of northwest Greenland in North Star Bay. During the winter 1849–50 Saunders named numerous landmarks in that area, including Saunders Island, while wintering in the frozen bay.

The Literary Expedition led by Ludvig Mylius-Erichsen wintered in 1903–1904 on the island. Its aim was to make ethnographic research of the local Inuit. Knud Rasmussen, Harald Moltke and Jørgen Brønlund were also part of this venture.

== Biodiversity ==
The island has been designated an Important Bird Area (IBA) by BirdLife International because it supports a breeding population of some 143,000 pairs of thick-billed murres, as well as other seabirds, including northern fulmars and black guillemots.

== See also ==
- List of islands of Greenland
- 70th meridian west
