= North Star Bay =

Bay in Greenland

- Thule Harbor; Wolstenholme Bay
- Location within Greenland
- Location: At the mouth of Wolstenholme Fjord in the Arctic
- Coordinates: 76°33′00″N 68°49′39″W
- Ocean/sea sources: Baffin Bay
- Basin countries: Greenland
- Islands: Saunders Island and Wolstenholme Island
- Settlements: Narsaarsuk

North Star Bay (Danish: North Star Bugt), also known as Thule Harbor and Wolstenholme Bay, is at the mouth of Wolstenholme Fjord in north-west Greenland. The Dundas Peninsula, terminating in the mesa-like Mount Dundas, is at the north-eastern end of the bay. Two large islands are off the bay, Saunders Island and Wolstenholme Island. Bylot Sound is the strait to the south, between the islands and the mainland.

The Inughuit settlements of Narsaarsuk and Pituffik were once on the shore of the bay. Knud Rasmussen established a trading post and mission called "Thule" at the north-eastern end in 1910. The United States started building defense facilities on the bay from 1943 and the Inughuit had to leave in 1953. The U.S. Pituffik Space Base is now the only inhabited place on the bay.

== History ==
The bay is named after HMS North Star, which was trapped by ice and wintered in the bay in 1849–50. North Star under Commander James Saunders sailed to the Arctic in spring 1849 on an expedition to search for and resupply Captain Sir James Clark Ross' venture, who itself had sailed in 1848 trying to locate the whereabouts of Sir John Franklin's expedition. Failing to find Franklin or Ross, Saunders' mission aboard North Star consisted of depositing stores along several named areas of the Canadian Arctic coast and returning to England before the onset of winter. However, the ship's progress northwards was hindered by ice in Melville Bay and it became trapped by ice off the coast in North Star Bay. Saunders named numerous landmarks in the area while wintering in the frozen bay in 1849–50. A paper left by Saunders in a cairn reads:

This paper is placed here to certify, that H.M.S, North Star was beset, at the east side of Melville Bay, on the 29th of July, last year, and gradually drifted from day to day, until, on the 26th of September, we found ourselves abreast of Wolstenholme Island; when perceiving the ice a little; more loose, and the Sound perfectly clear, we made all plain sail, and pressed her through it, anchoring in the lower part of the Sound that evening, and arrived in the Bay on the 1st of October, where she remained throughout the winter.

The Greenlandic–Danish explorer Knud Rasmussen established a trading post and mission at the north-eastern end of the bay in 1910. He called the site "Thule" after classical ultima Thule; the Inughuit called it Umanaq or Uummannaq ("heart-shaped"), and the site is commonly called "Dundas" today. Whaling captain, explorer, and ethnologist George Comer discovered a midden, dubbed Comer's Midden, at Umanaq in 1916, and an archaeological excavation revealed a village of the proto-Inuit who came to be called the Thule people.

The United States built a weather station at Thule in 1943. They added an airstrip at Pituffik in 1946, and the Inughuit had to leave Pituffik for Thule. The U.S. started building Thule Air Base, now Pituffik Space Base, in 1950. The USAF wanted to construct an air defense site near Thule in 1953, and the Inughuit had to leave Thule (which became "Old Thule") and North Star Bay and move further north to Qaanaaq, which was given the name "Thule" (colloquially "New Thule"). A nuclear accident occurred at North Star Bay in 1968 during the Cold War when a U.S. B-52 bomber carrying four thermonuclear bombs crashed, spreading contaminated material over the area.

== Images ==
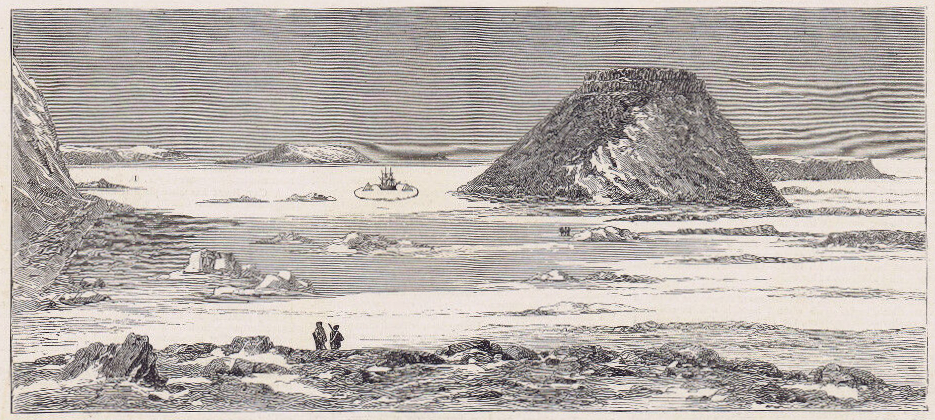
North Star Bay, with the ship North Star stuck in ice near Mount Dundas, 1849–50

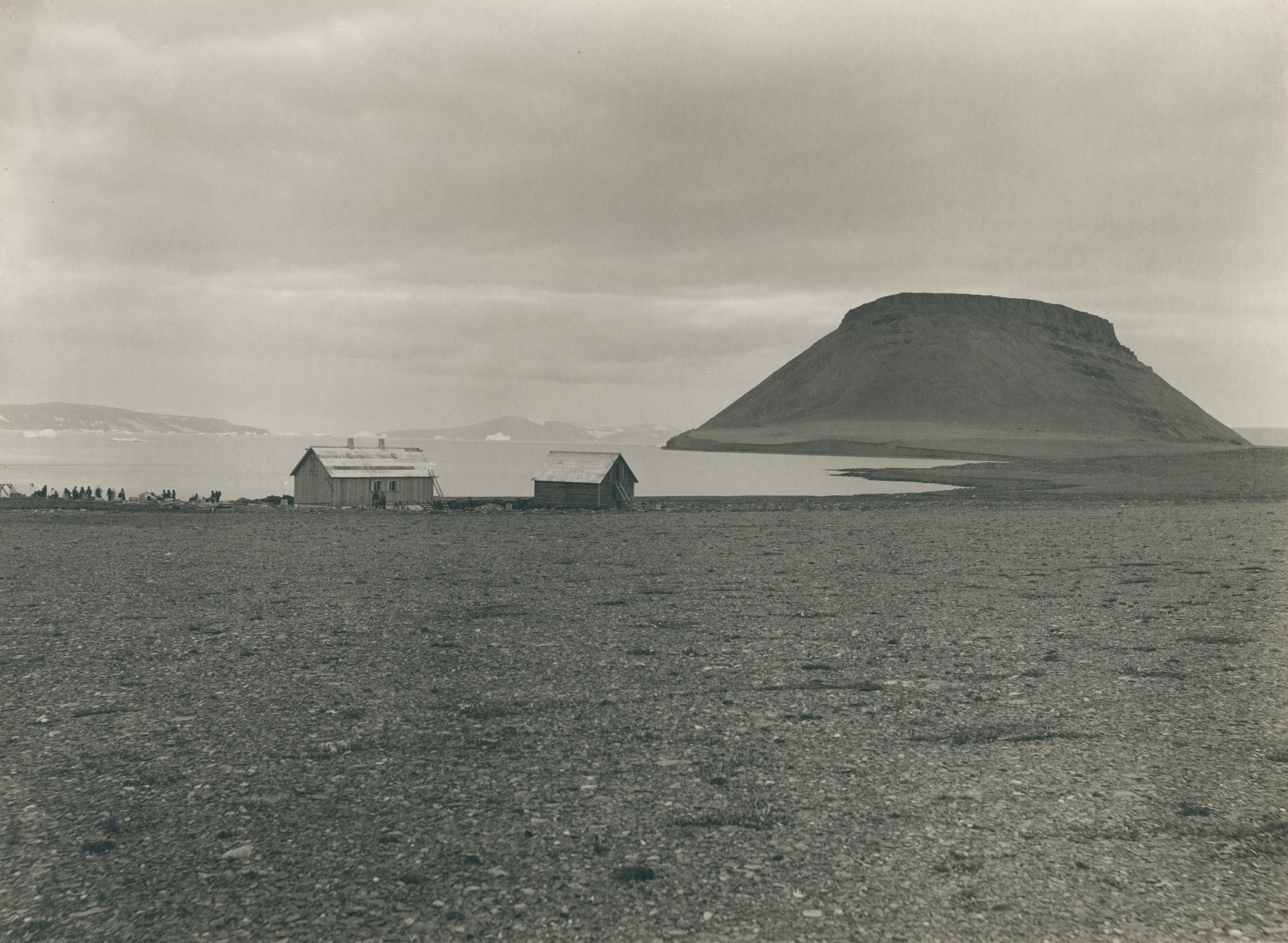
Thule station buildings being completed on North Star Bay on 4 August 1909

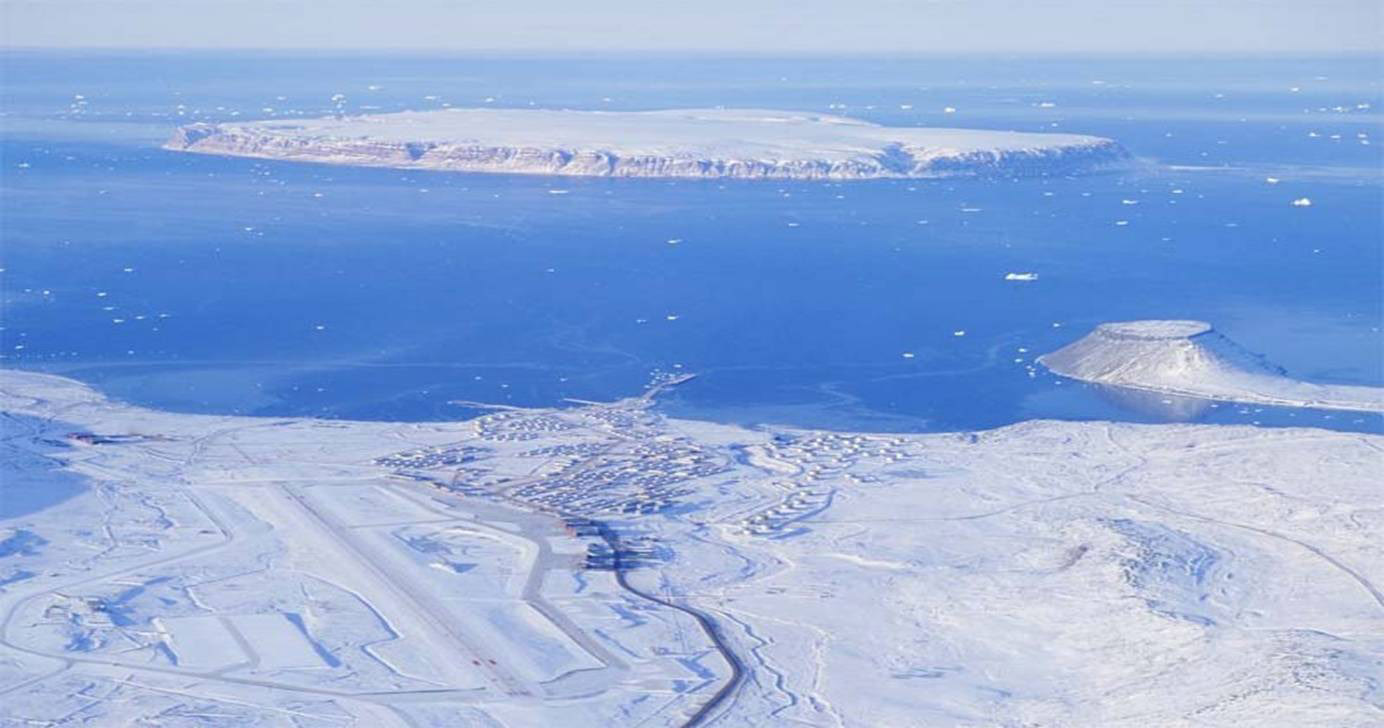
North Star Bay with Pituffik Space Base in the foreground and Saunders Island in the background

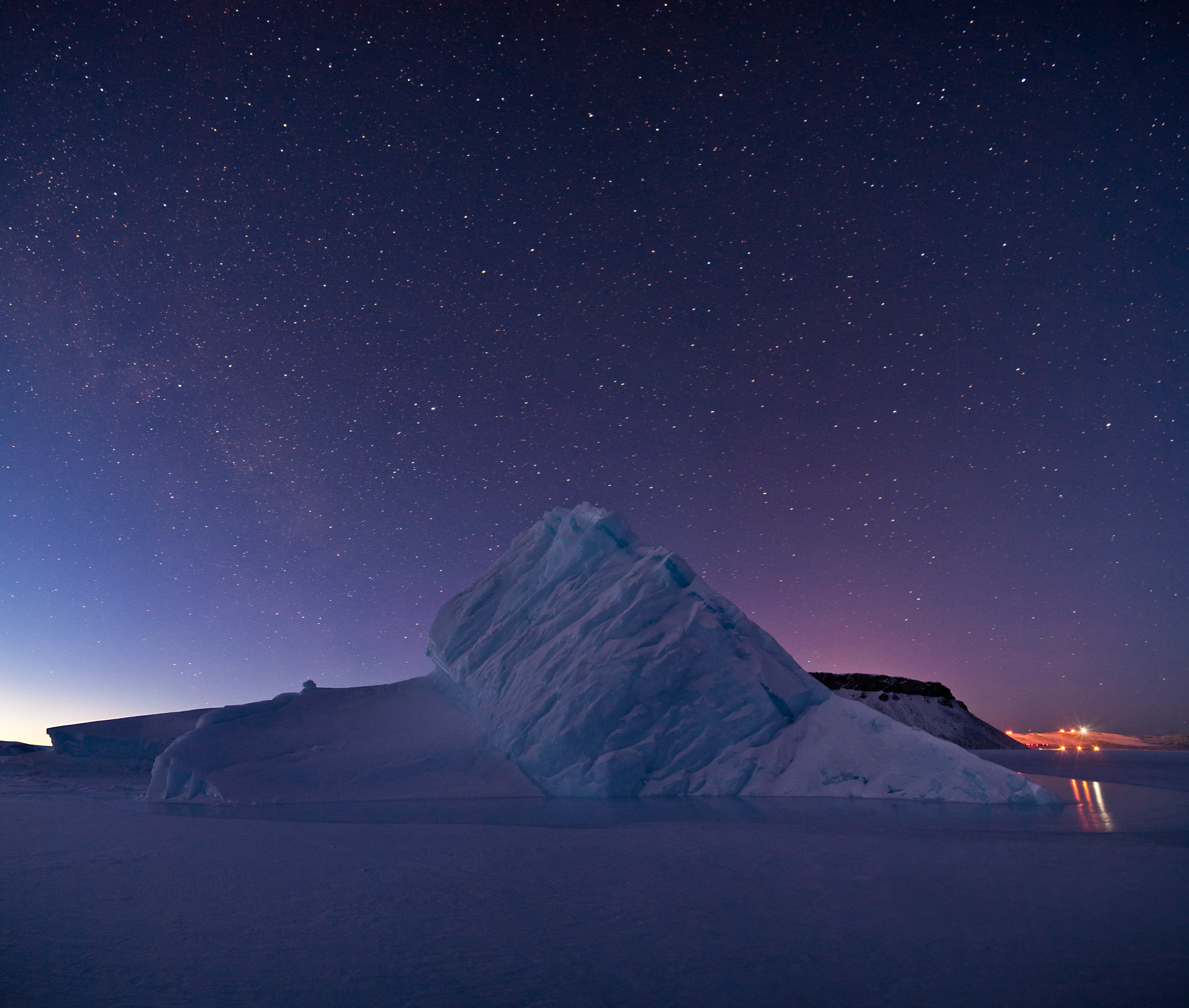
An unnamed berg frozen in place by sea ice in the bay
