= Harald Moltke Glacier =

Glacier in Greenland

- Sermersuak
- Location within Greenland
- Type: Tidal outlet glacier
- Location: Greenland
- Coordinates: 76°36′N 67°47′W
- Width: 1.5 km (0.93 mi)
- Terminus: Wolstenholme Fjord; Baffin Bay

The Harald Moltke Glacier (Greenlandic: Sermersuak) is a glacier in Greenland.

== Geography ==
The Harald Moltke Glacier is located in the far northwest of Greenland, to the north of the Thule Air Base. It is one of four large glaciers which feeds the Wolstenholme Fjord (sometimes referred to as "the world's largest ice machine"). The other glaciers are the Salisbury Glacier, the Chamberlin Glacier, and the Knud Rasmussen Glacier. The Harald Moltke Glacier is over 5 kilometres (3.1 mi) in length and is approximately 1,500 metres (4,900 ft) in width.

== See also ==
- List of glaciers in Greenland
