= Richard Overton Hunziker =

United States Air Force general (1916–1971)

General Richard Overton Hunziker
- Born: July 6, 1916; Los Angeles, California
- Died: May 29, 1971 (aged 54); Topatopa Mountains, California
- Burial place: Pacific Ocean
- Spouse: Margaret ("Maggie") Bailard
- Military career
- Allegiance: United States
- Branch: United States Air Force
- Rank: Major general
- Service number: 18059512
- Conflicts: World War II - Mediterranean Sea
- Awards: Distinguished Service Medal; Silver Star; Legion of Merit; Distinguished Flying Cross with two oak leaf clusters Air Medal with 13 oak leaf clusters Commendation_Medal; Distinguished Unit Citation; European-African-Middle Eastern Campaign Medal with 8 battle stars French Croix de Guerre with palm and star

Richard Overton Hunziker (6 July 1916 – 29 May 1971) was a decorated World War II fighter pilot and later United States Air Force major general. He played a significant role in the Cold War and commanded operations at Project Crested Ice.

== Early life and career ==
Richard Hunziker was born to Eugene Phillip ("E.P.") Hunziker Sr. and Jane Hunziker, along with siblings Joanne ("Jody") Burns, Eugene Phillip Jr., and Frank P. Their father owned and operated Hunziker Construction Co. Richard graduated from Tucson High School in 1935 and from the University of Arizona in 1948, receiving the UA Alumni Military Service Award in 1969. Richard married Margaret Bailard, also a University of Arizona alumna.

== U.S. Air Force ==
=== World War II ===
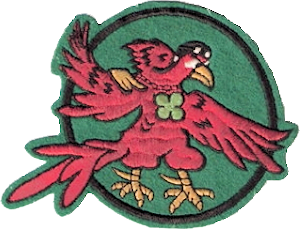
65th Fighter Squadron Emblem, depicted on Hunziker's P-47

Hunziker enlisted on 6 Jan 1942 in the Army Air Forces and received his commission at Moore Field as second lieutenant and pilot's wings later that year. During World War II, he flew 203 combat missions as a P-40 Warhawk and P-47 Thunderbolt pilot with the 65th Fighter Squadron, part of the 57th Fighter Group, over Africa, Italy, Sicily, Malta, and Corsica. On Palm Sunday, 18 Apr 1943, Second Lieutenant Hunziker was a rookie on his second combat mission, flying the P-40F 'No 61' as wingman for his squadron commander over North Africa. Hunziker became separated from his commander but shot down his first plane, a Junkers Ju 52. On 12 Jan 44, Hunziker claimed another kill, a Messerschmitt Bf 109. Hunziker was a jet rated pilot with more than 6,800 flying hours and held the senior missileman badge. In May–June, 1944, Captain Hunziker commanded the 65th Fighter Squadron, stationed at Alto airfield, Corsica, and then became the 57th FG operations officer.

=== Cold War ===
Seal of the U.S. Air Force

After the war, Hunziker commanded fighter and bomber groups and then wings. In June 1948, he was assigned to U.S. Air Forces in Europe as a squadron commander and deputy commander, 36th Fighter Group, and commander of the 86th Fighter Group in Germany. From 6 Mar-18 Oct 1951, Col. Hunziker commanded the 86th Fighter-Bomber Group (assigned to the 86th Fighter Wing) stationed for at least part of the time at Giebelstadt AB, Germany. In November 1951, Hunziker was assigned to the Strategic Air Command (SAC) as director of operations, 42nd Air Division, Bergstrom AFB, Texas. From 4 Aug 1952 to 22 Apr 1954, Col. Hunziker commanded the 12th Fighter-Escort Wing (renamed the 12 Strategic Fighter Wing during Hunziker's command). During this period, the 12th provided fighter escort and air defense for SAC bomber forces, was stationed at Bergstrom AFB but was deployed at Misawa AB, Japan, 15 May-10 Aug 1953. In May 1954, Col. Hunziker assumed command of the 506th Strategic Fighter Wing at Dow AFB, Maine and transferred the wing to Tinker AFB, Oklahoma on 20 March 1955.

Hunziker graduated from the National War College in 1958 and became director of material for the SAC's Second Air Force at Barksdale AFB, Louisiana. In July 1960, Col. Hunziker assumed command of the 21st Air Division at Forbes AFB, Kansas and then the 821st Strategic Aerospace Division at Ellsworth AFB, SD. From Aug 1962 to Jan 1965, Brigadier General Hunziker was deputy commander of the 1st Strategic Aerospace Division at Vandenberg AFB, California. In January 1965, he resumed command of the 821st Strategic Aerospace Division, Ellsworth AFB and was named deputy director of operations at SAC. In July 1965, General Hunziker was assigned to SAC headquarters at Offutt AFB, Nebraska and was named deputy chief of staff for material in Oct 1966. On April 21, 1966, the U.S. Senate confirmed Hunziker's promotion to Major General. He was named deputy inspector general for inspection and safety with headquarters at Norton AFB in May 1968.

General Hunziker is perhaps best known publicly for directing Project Crested Ice, recovering four nuclear weapons lost during a 1968 B-52 crash in Greenland, and attempting to remediate the surrounding area. He was awarded the Distinguished Service Medal for this effort.

== Personal life ==
Richard and Margaret Hunziker had two sons, John Richard Hunziker and Russell Lawrence Hunziker.

== Retirement ==
General Hunziker retired on 1 Sep 1969 at the former Norton Air Force Base, San Bernardino County, California. On 29 May 1971, Hunziker was flying his Cessna 182, returning Margaret and him from Calexico to Santa Barbara, when the small plane crashed on Tapa Mountain, near Hines Peak in the Topatopa Mountains. Both Richard and Margaret were killed. The plane remains intact and undisturbed at the crash site.

== External sources ==
- PROJECT STRANGLE, 05/1944. Motion Picture Films from the "Combat Subjects". U.S. War Department, Army Air Forces. May 1944. National Archives Identifier: 3955; Local Identifier: 18-CS-1422; Record Group 18: Records of the Army Air Forces, ca. 1902 - 1964; ARC Identifier: 3955; NAIL Control Number: NWDNM(m)-18-CS-1422. Reel 4: silent. For complete history of the 67th Fighter Group consult caption sheet. Location is Corsica, 29 April 1944. Segment 19: CU Capt Richard O Hunziker as he climbs into cockpit of P-47, crew chief assisting him with parachute.
