= 1957 Paris NATO summit =

1957 NATO summit meeting in Paris, France

Paris summit
- Host country: France
- Dates: 16–19 December 1957

The 1957 Paris summit was the first NATO summit bringing the leaders of member nations together at the same time. The formal sessions and informal meetings in Paris, France took place on 16–19 December 1957. This was only the second meeting of the NATO heads of state following the ceremonial signing of the North Atlantic Treaty on 4 April 1949.

== Background ==
At the time of the 1957 summit, NATO countries were at what The New York Times and others labeled as a crucial "crossroads" in their relationship. The summit was designed as "a reconsideration of the relationship of the strategy for the defense of Western Europe", particularly in light of fading US nuclear superiority with regard to the Soviet Union. The summit was considered to be the main American diplomatic response to the Russian launch of the orbiting Sputnik satellite.

The unanimous agreement in principle to deploy intermediate range ballistic missiles (IRBMs) in Europe was counterbalanced by the decision to emphasize diplomatic negotiations with the Soviets. The ratification of this two-pronged strategy was one of the summit's accomplishments. British Prime Minister Harold Macmillan was the leader of those pushing for a "dual-track" approach in dealing with threats to international stability. He argued in favor of two separate, but parallel agendas—one military and the other political.

The summit discussions resulted in a dilution of the defiant posture the Americans had argued for NATO to adopt.

== Agenda ==
The general discussions focused on the need for cooperation in order to mitigate conflict in international policies and in order to further encourage economic collaboration, including:

- Reaffirming of the principle purposes;
- Confirming the unity of the Atlantic Alliance;
- Improving the coordination and organization of NATO forces;
- Improving the coordination and organization of political consultations; and
- Recognizing the need for closer economic ties;
- Location of tactical nuclear weapons in member states as well as nuclear-free zones.

== See also ==
- EU summit
- G8 summit
- Thulegate
- Relations between France and NATO
