= Knud Rasmussen Glacier =

Glacier in Avannaata, Greenland

Coordinates: 76.72°N 67.87°W

The Knud Rasmussen Glacier is located in the far northwest of Greenland, to the north of the Thule Air Base. It is one of four large glaciers which feeds the Wolstenholme Fjord (sometimes referred to as "the world's largest ice machine"). The other glaciers are the Salisbury Glacier, the Chamberlin Glacier, and the Harald Moltke Glacier. The Knud Rasmussen Glacier is over 3 kilometres (1.9 mi) in length and is approximately 900 metres (3,000 ft) in width.

== See also ==
- List of glaciers in Greenland
