= Salisbury Glacier =

Glacier in Greenland

- Pinguarsuit Sermiat
- Location within Greenland
- Type: Tidal outlet glacier
- Location: Greenland
- Coordinates: 76°41′N 68°44′W
- Width: 0.45 km (0.28 mi)
- Terminus: Wolstenholme Fjord; Baffin Bay

The Salisbury Glacier (Greenlandic: Pinguarsuit Sermiat) is a glacier in Greenland.

== Geography ==
This glacier is located in the far northwest of Greenland, to the north of the Thule Air Base. It is one of four large glaciers which feeds the Wolstenholme Fjord (sometimes referred to as "the world's largest ice machine"). The other glaciers are the Chamberlin Glacier, the Knud Rasmussen Glacier, and the Harald Moltke Glacier. The Salisbury Glacier is over 3 kilometres (1.9 mi) in length and is approximately 450 metres (1,480 ft) in width.

== See also ==
- List of glaciers in Greenland
