= Wolstenholme Fjord =

Fjord in Greenland

- Uummannap Kangerlua (Greenlandic)
- Location in Greenland
- Location: Arctic
- Coordinates: 76°37′55″N 68°38′15″W
- Ocean/sea sources: Baffin Bay
- Basin countries: Greenland

Wolstenholme Fjord (Greenlandic: Uummannap Kangerlua) is a fjord in Avannaata municipality, Northwest Greenland. The United States' Pituffik Space Base and the abandoned Inuit settlement of Narsaarsuk are on the coast of the fjord.

The area was contaminated in 1968 with plutonium and other radioactive elements following a B-52 bomber crash.

== Geography ==
Wolstenholme Fjord is located in the stretch of coast between Cape York and Cape Alexander. Together with the Inglefield Gulf it is one of the two main indentations in the area.

Saunders Island, Wolstenholme Island and Bylot Sound lie at the mouth of the fjord, off North Star Bay. Further to the west on the northern shore lies the Granville Fjord.

The fjord's waters are fed by four large glaciers: the Salisbury Glacier, the Chamberlin Glacier, the Knud Rasmussen Glacier, and the Harald Moltke Glacier.

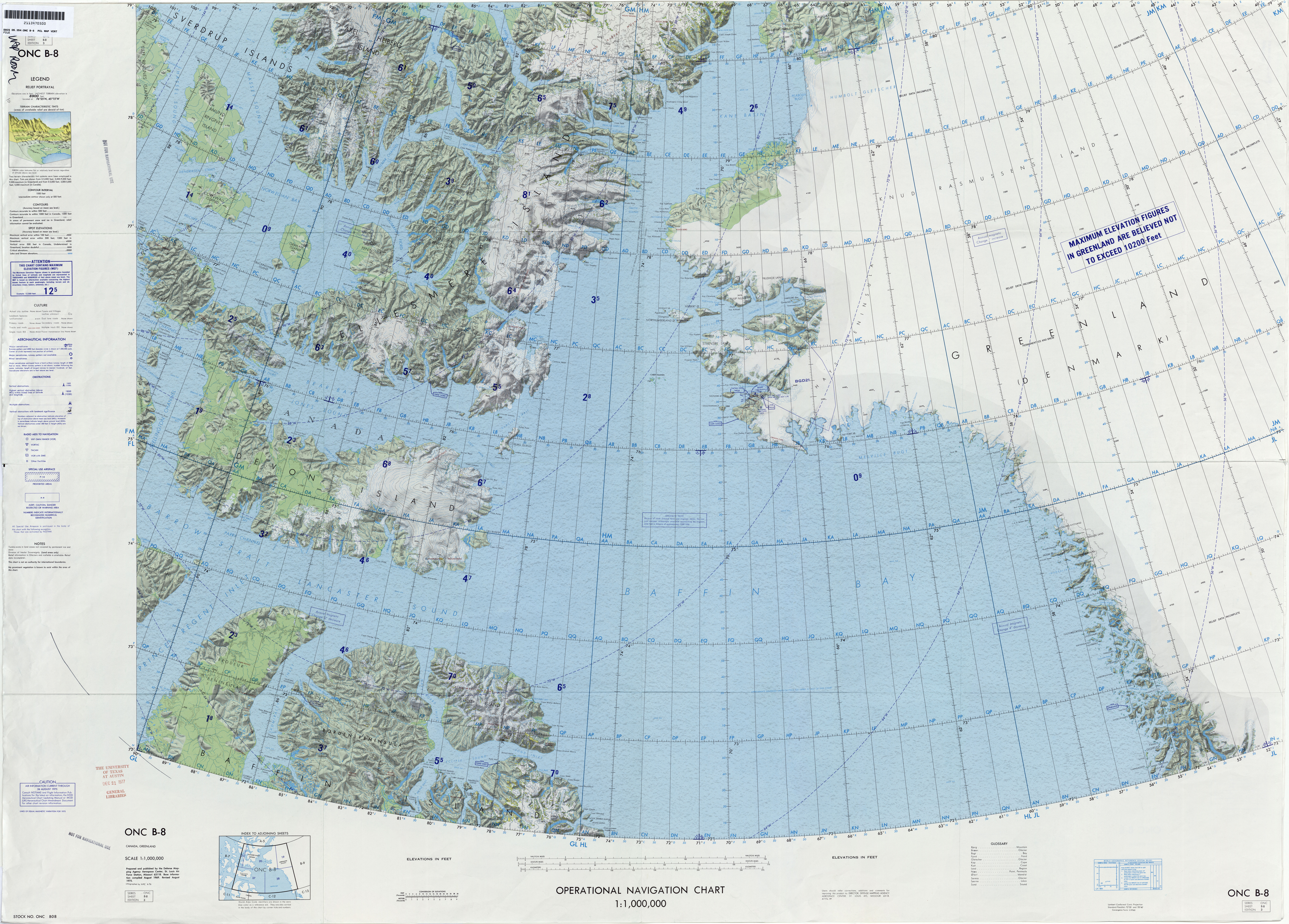
Map of Northwestern Greenland

== See also ==
- List of fjords of Greenland
