= Chamberlin Glacier (Greenland) =

Glacier in Greenland

Coordinates: 76.71°N 68.44°W

The Chamberlin Glacier is located in the far northwest of Greenland, to the north of the Thule Air Base. It is one of four large glaciers which feeds the Wolstenholme Fjord. The other glaciers are the Salisbury Glacier, the Knud Rasmussen Glacier, and the Harald Moltke Glacier. The Chamberlin Glacier is the longest of the four glaciers (over 8 kilometres (5.0 mi) in length) and is approximately 800 metres (2,600 ft) in width.

== See also ==
- List of glaciers in Greenland
