= 110th meridian east =

Line of longitude

110th meridian east

The meridian 110° east of Greenwich is a line of longitude that extends from the North Pole across the Arctic Ocean, Asia, the Indian Ocean, the Southern Ocean, and Antarctica to the South Pole.

The 110th meridian east forms a great ellipse with the 70th meridian west.

== From Pole to Pole ==
Starting at the North Pole and heading south to the South Pole, the 110th meridian east passes through:

Co-ordinates	Country, territory or sea	Notes
90°0′N 110°0′E	Arctic Ocean	
79°30′N 110°0′E	Laptev Sea	
76°42′N 110°0′E	Russia	Krasnoyarsk Krai — Taymyr Peninsula
74°22′N 110°0′E	Khatanga Gulf	
74°0′N 110°0′E	Russia	Krasnoyarsk Krai
73°42′N 110°0′E	Khatanga Gulf	
73°29′N 110°0′E	Russia	Krasnoyarsk Krai; Sakha Republic — from 70°24′N 110°0′E; Irkutsk Oblast — from 61°19′N 110°0′E; Sakha Republic — from 60°32′N 110°0′E; Irkutsk Oblast — from 59°1′N 110°0′E; Republic of Buryatia — from 56°58′N 110°0′E; Zabaykalsky Krai — from 51°37′N 110°0′E
49°12′N 110°0′E	Mongolia	
42°38′N 110°0′E	People's Republic of China	Inner Mongolia – passing just east of Baotou (at 40°39′N 109°50′E); Shaanxi – from 39°11′N 110°0′E; Hubei – from 33°8′N 110°0′E; Shaanxi – from 32°50′N 110°0′E; Hubei – from 32°31′N 110°0′E; Chongqing – from 31°26′N 110°0′E; Hubei – from 30°52′N 110°0′E; Hunan – from 29°45′N 110°0′E; Guangxi – from 26°9′N 110°0′E – passing just west of Guilin (at 25°16.9164′N 110°17.1834′E); Guangdong – from 21°53′N 110°0′E
20°17′N 110°0′E	South China Sea	Qiongzhou Strait
19°56′N 110°0′E	People's Republic of China	Island of Hainan
18°22′N 110°0′E	South China Sea	
1°42′N 110°0′E	Malaysia	Sarawak – on the island of Borneo
1°18′N 110°0′E	Indonesia	West Kalimantan – on the island of Borneo
1°17′S 110°0′E	South China Sea	
1°43′S 110°0′E	Indonesia	West Kalimantan – on the island of Borneo
1°54′S 110°0′E	South China Sea	
2°57′S 110°0′E	Java Sea	
6°55′S 110°0′E	Indonesia	Island of Java
7°53′S 110°0′E	Indian Ocean	
60°0′S 110°0′E	Southern Ocean	
66°38′S 110°0′E	Antarctica	Australian Antarctic Territory, claimed by Australia

Next westward: 109th meridian east	110th meridian east forms a great circle with 70th meridian west	Next eastward: 111th meridian east
