= 70th meridian west =

Line of longitude

70th meridian west

The meridian 70° west of Greenwich is a line of longitude that extends from the North Pole across the Arctic Ocean, North America, the Atlantic Ocean, the Caribbean Sea, South America, the Pacific Ocean, the Southern Ocean, and Antarctica to the South Pole.

The 70th meridian west forms a great circle with the 110th meridian east.

== From Pole to Pole ==
Starting at the North Pole and heading south to the South Pole, the 70th meridian west passes through:

Co-ordinates	Country, territory or sea	Notes
90°0′N 70°0′W	Arctic Ocean	
83°7′N 70°0′W	Canada	Nunavut – Ellesmere Island
80°14′N 70°0′W	Nares Strait	
78°47′N 70°0′W	Greenland	Inglefield Land, Saunders Island and Wolstenholme Island
76°24′N 70°0′W	Baffin Bay	
70°51′N 70°0′W	Canada	Nunavut – Baffin Island
62°45′N 70°0′W	Hudson Strait	
62°34′N 70°0′W	Canada	Nunavut – High Bluff Island
62°33′N 70°0′W	Hudson Strait	
61°1′N 70°0′W	Canada	Nunavut – Diana Island
60°57′N 70°0′W	Diana Bay	
60°50′N 70°0′W	Canada	Quebec
47°42′N 70°0′W	Saint Lawrence River	
47°30′N 70°0′W	Canada	Quebec
46°40′N 70°0′W	United States	Maine
43°43′N 70°0′W	Atlantic Ocean	Gulf of Maine
41°58′N 70°0′W	United States	Massachusetts – Cape Cod and Monomoy Island
41°33′N 70°0′W	Atlantic Ocean	Nantucket Sound
41°19′N 70°0′W	United States	Massachusetts – Nantucket Island
41°14′N 70°0′W	Atlantic Ocean	
19°41′N 70°0′W	Dominican Republic	Island of Hispaniola – passing just west of Santo Domingo (at 18°29′N 69°54′W)
18°25′N 70°0′W	Caribbean Sea	
12°35′N 70°0′W	Aruba	
12°28′N 70°0′W	Caribbean Sea	
12°11′N 70°0′W	Venezuela	
6°53′N 70°0′W	Colombia	
0°34′N 70°0′W	Brazil	Amazonas
0°12′S 70°0′W	Colombia	
4°10′S 70°0′W	Peru	Loreto Region – for about 16 km
4°19′S 70°0′W	Brazil	Amazonas; Acre – from 8°20′S 70°0′W)
10°58′S 70°0′W	Peru	Madre de Dios Region; Puno Region – from 13°9′S 70°0′W); Tacna Region – from 17°7′S 70°0′W)
18°16′S 70°0′W	Chile	
29°19′S 70°0′W	Argentina	For about 8 km
29°24′S 70°0′W	Chile	
30°23′S 70°0′W	Argentina	
32°52′S 70°0′W	Chile	For about 8 km
32°56′S 70°0′W	Argentina	
33°16′S 70°0′W	Chile	
34°17′S 70°0′W	Argentina	
52°0′S 70°0′W	Chile	
52°33′S 70°0′W	Straits of Magellan	
52°50′S 70°0′W	Chile	Isla Grande de Tierra del Fuego, Thompson Island, Waterman Island and Hoste Island
55°22′S 70°0′W	Pacific Ocean	
60°0′S 70°0′W	Southern Ocean	
69°17′S 70°0′W	Antarctica	Alexander Island and mainland – claimed by Argentina (Argentine Antarctica), Chile (Antártica Chilena Province) and United Kingdom (British Antarctic Territory)

== See also ==
- 69th meridian west
- 71st meridian west
