= 1968 Thule Air Base B-52 crash =

1968 aviation accident

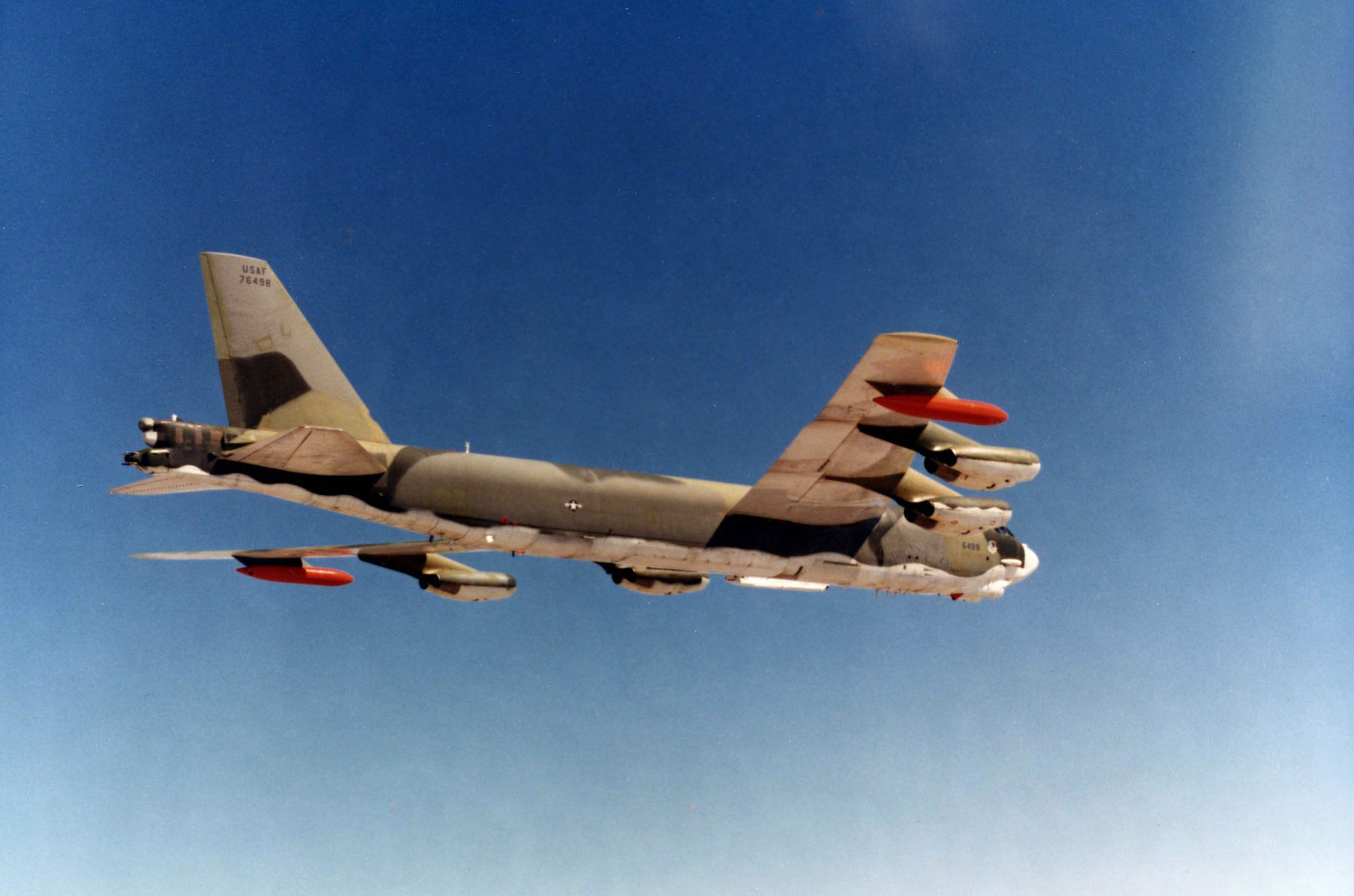
- A B-52G, similar to the one that crashed at Thule Air Base

Accident
- Date: 21 January 1968
- Summary: In-flight fire leading to crew ejecting
- Site: 7.5 miles (12.1 km) west of Thule Air Base (formerly Pituffik), Greenland; 76°31′40″N 69°16′55″W

Aircraft
- Aircraft type: B-52G Stratofortress
- Operator: 380th Strategic Bomb Wing, Strategic Air Command, United States Air Force
- Registration: 58-0188
- Flight origin: Plattsburgh Air Force Base
- Stopover: Baffin Bay (holding pattern)
- Destination: Plattsburgh Air Force Base
- Crew: 7
- Fatalities: 1
- Injuries: 0
- Survivors: 6

On 21 January 1968, an aircraft accident, sometimes known as the Thule affair or Thule accident (/ˈtuːli/; Danish: Thuleulykken), involving a United States Air Force (USAF) B-52 bomber occurred near Thule Air Base in the Danish territory of Greenland. The aircraft was carrying four B28FI thermonuclear bombs on a Cold War "Chrome Dome" alert mission over Baffin Bay when a cabin fire forced the crew to abandon the aircraft before they could carry out an emergency landing at Thule Air Base. Six crew members ejected safely, but one who did not have an ejection seat was killed while trying to bail out. The bomber crashed onto sea ice in North Star Bay, (Note: Also known as Bylot Sound.) Greenland, causing the conventional explosives aboard to detonate and the nuclear payload to rupture and disperse, resulting in radioactive contamination of the area.

The United States and Denmark launched an intensive clean-up and recovery operation, but the secondary stage of one of the nuclear weapons could not be accounted for after the operation was completed. USAF Strategic Air Command "Chrome Dome" operations were discontinued immediately after the accident, which highlighted the safety and political risks of the missions. Safety procedures were reviewed, and more stable explosives were developed for use in nuclear weapons.

In 1995, a political scandal arose in Denmark after a report revealed the government had given tacit permission for nuclear weapons to be located in Greenland, in contravention of Denmark's 1957 nuclear-free zone policy. Workers involved in the clean-up program campaigned for compensation for radiation-related illnesses they experienced in the years after the accident.

== Thule Monitor Mission ==
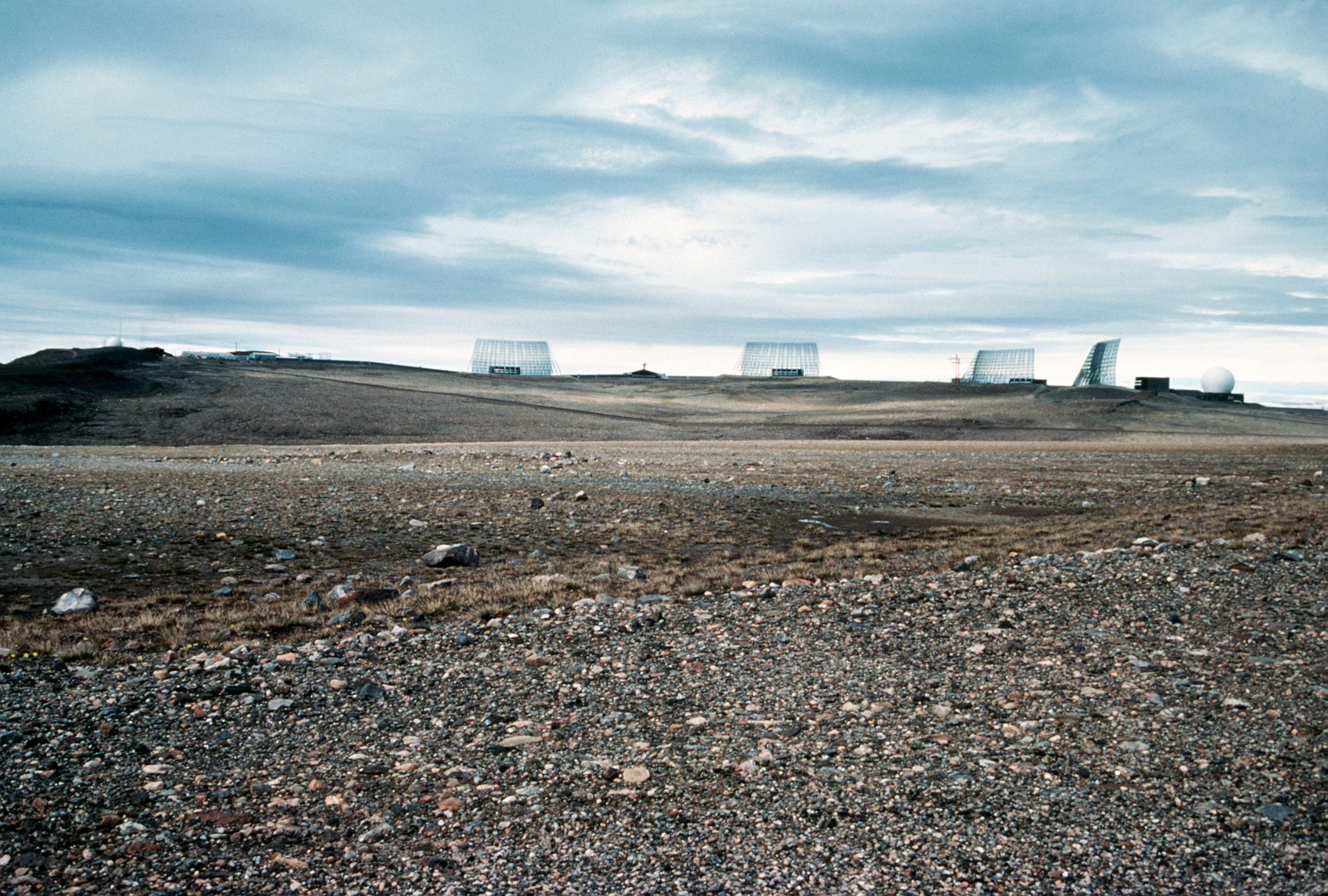
BMEWS antennas at Thule, with a modern Satellite Control Network radome on the right, 1984

In 1960, the United States Air Force (USAF) Strategic Air Command (SAC) began Operation Chrome Dome, a Cold War airborne alert program devised by General Thomas S. Power to fly nuclear-armed Boeing B-52 Stratofortress bombers to the borders of the Soviet Union. The flights were scheduled to ensure that twelve bombers were aloft at all times. These bombers gave SAC offensive capability in the event of a Soviet first strike. Beginning in 1961, B-52 bombers also secretly flew as part of the "Hard Head" mission (or "Thule Monitor Missions") over Thule Air Base. The objective of "Hard Head" was to maintain constant visual surveillance of the base's strategically important Ballistic Missile Early Warning System (BMEWS), which provided early warning of Soviet missile launches. This ensured that, if the communication link between North American Aerospace Defense Command and the base was severed, then the aircraft crew could determine if the interruption resulted from an actual attack or a mere technical failure. (Note: Satellite verification and monitoring were not possible at the time.) The monitoring mission started when the designated aircraft reached a waypoint at 75°0′N 67°30′W in Baffin Bay and entered a figure-eight holding pattern above the air base at an altitude of 35,000 feet (11,000 m).

Greenland

In 1966, United States Secretary of Defense Robert McNamara proposed cutting "Chrome Dome" flights because the BMEWS system was fully operational, the bombers had been made redundant by missiles, and $123 million ($1.22 billion as of 2025) could be saved annually. SAC and the Joint Chiefs of Staff opposed the plan, so a compromise was reached whereby a smaller force of four bombers would be on alert each day. Despite the reduced program and the risks highlighted by the 1966 Palomares B-52 crash, SAC continued to dedicate one of the aircraft to monitoring Thule Air Base. This assignment was without the knowledge of civilian authorities in the United States, who SAC determined did not have the "need to know" about specific operational points.

== Broken Arrow ==
On 21 January 1968, a B-52G Stratofortress, serial number 58-0188, with the callsign "HOBO 28" from the 380th Strategic Aerospace Wing at Plattsburgh Air Force Base, New York was assigned the "Hard Head" mission over Thule and nearby Baffin Bay. The bomber crew consisted of five regular crew members, including Captain John Haug, the aircraft commander; Radar navigator Major Frank Hopkins; and Electronic warfare officer Captain Richard Marx. Also aboard were the co-pilot, Leonard Svitenko, a substitute navigator (Captain Curtis R. Criss) and a mandatory third pilot (Major Alfred D'Amario).

Before take-off, D'Amario placed three cloth-covered foam cushions on top of a heating vent under the instructor navigator's seat in the aft section of the lower deck. Shortly after take-off, another cushion was placed under the seat. The flight was uneventful until the scheduled mid-air refueling from a KC-135 Stratotanker, which had to be conducted manually because of an error with the B-52G's autopilot. About one hour after refueling, while the aircraft was circling above its designated area, Captain Haug directed co-pilot Leonard Svitenko to take his rest period. His seat was taken by the spare pilot, D'Amario. The crew was uncomfortable because of the cold, although the heater's rheostat was turned up, so D'Amario opened an engine bleed valve to draw additional hot air into the heater from the engine manifold. Because of a heater malfunction, the air barely cooled as it traveled from the engine manifold to the cabin's heating ducts. During the next half-hour, the cabin's temperature became uncomfortably hot, and the stowed cushions ignited. After one crew member reported smelling burning rubber, they looked for a fire. The navigator searched the lower compartment twice before discovering the fire behind a metal box. He attempted to fight it with two fire extinguishers, but could not put it out.

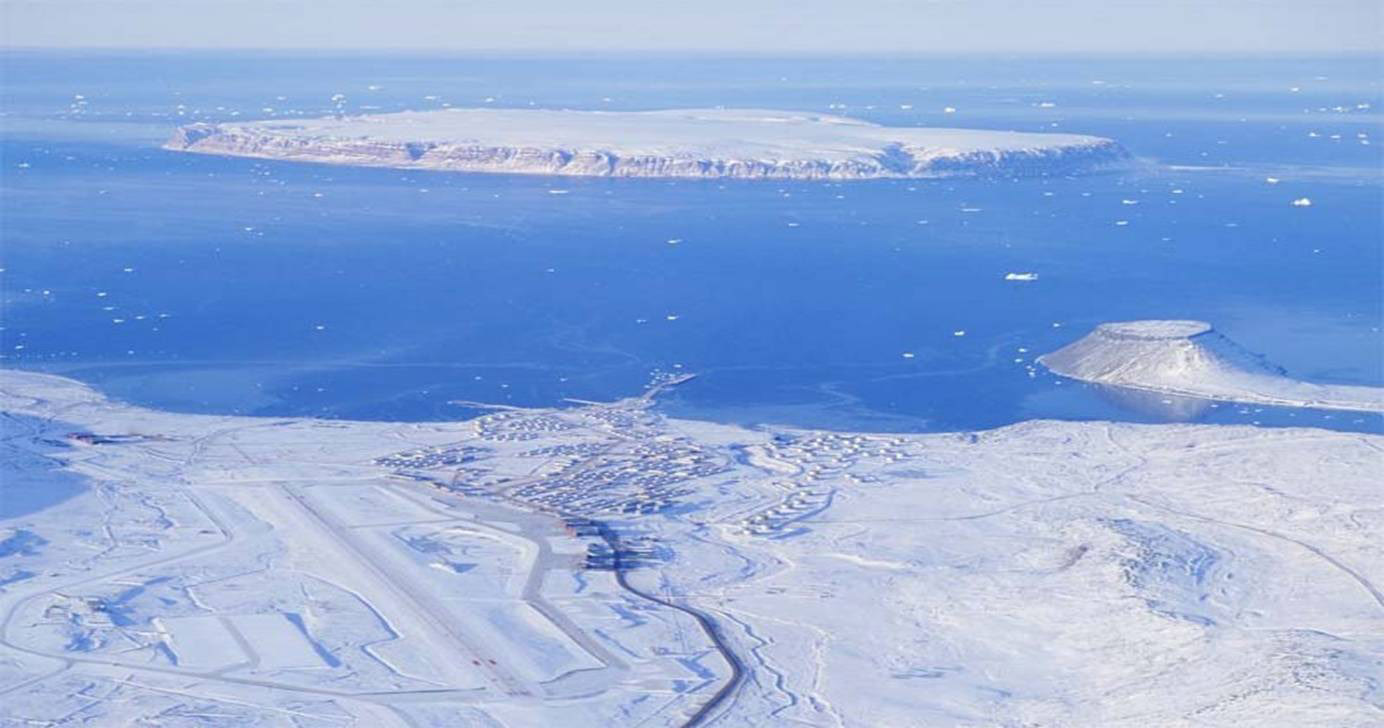
Thule Air Base in the foreground with North Star Bay, which was covered in sea ice at the time of the accident, in the background

At 15:22 EST, about six hours into the flight and 90 miles (140 km) south of Thule Air Base, Haug declared an emergency. He told Thule air traffic control that he had a fire on board and requested permission to perform an emergency landing at the air base. Within five minutes, the aircraft's fire extinguishers were depleted, electrical power was lost and smoke filled the cockpit to the point that the pilots could not read their instruments. As the situation worsened, the captain realized he would not be able to land the aircraft and told the crew to prepare to abandon it. They awaited word from D'Amario that they were over land, and when he confirmed that the aircraft was directly over the lights of Thule Air Base, the four crewmen ejected, followed shortly thereafter by Haug and D'Amario. The co-pilot, Leonard Svitenko, who had given up his ejection seat when the spare pilot took over from him, sustained fatal head injuries when he attempted to bail out through one of the lower hatches.

The pilotless aircraft initially continued north, then turned left through 180° and crashed onto sea ice in North Star Bay at a relatively shallow angle of 20 degrees—about 7.5 miles (12.1 km) west of Thule Air Base—at 15:39 EST. (Note: Some sources say Wolstenholme Fjord is a more accurate name for the area, as the crash site was outside a line between the two capes at the extremities of North Star Bay.) The conventional high explosive (HE) components of four 1.1 megaton B28FI thermonuclear bombs detonated on impact, spreading radioactive material over a large area in a manner similar to a dirty bomb.

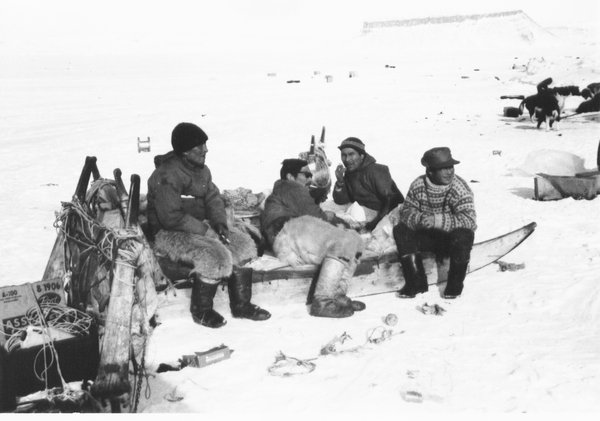
Inuit around the base worked with the U.S. Air Force to get to the B-52 crash. The sleds were the only way to get to the crash site

Haug and D'Amario parachuted onto the grounds of the air base and made contact with the base commander within ten minutes of each other. They informed him that at least six crew ejected successfully and the aircraft was carrying four nuclear weapons. Off-duty staff were mustered to conduct search and rescue operations for the remaining crew members. Owing to the extreme weather conditions, Arctic darkness, and unnavigable ice, the base relied largely on the Thule representative of the Royal Greenland Trade Department, Ministry of Greenland, Jens Zinglersen, to raise and mount the search using native dog sled teams. Three of the survivors landed within 1.5 miles (2.4 km) of the base and were rescued within two hours. For his initial actions and later services, Zinglersen received the Air Force Exceptional Civilian Service Medal on 26 February 1968 at the hands of the U.S. Ambassador, K. E. White. Gunner Staff Sergeant Calvin Snapp, who was first to eject, landed 6 miles (9.7 km) from the base—he remained lost on an ice floe for 21 hours and suffered hypothermia in the −23 °F (−31 °C) temperatures, but he survived by wrapping himself in his parachute.

An aerial survey of the crash site immediately afterwards showed only six engines, a tire and small items of debris on the blackened surface of the ice. The accident was designated a Broken Arrow, or an accident involving a nuclear weapon but which does not present a risk of war.

== Project Crested Ice ==
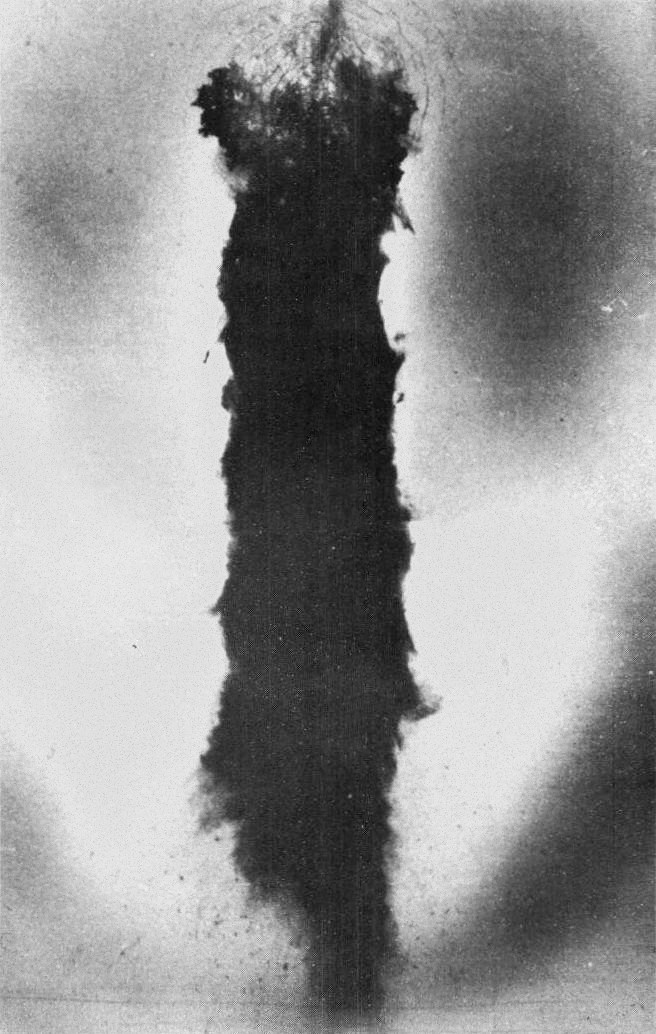
Aerial photograph of blackened ice at the crash scene, with the point of impact at the top

The resulting explosion and fire destroyed many of the components that had scattered widely in a 1-mile (1.6 km) by 3-mile (4.8 km) area. Parts of the bomb bay were found 2 miles (3.2 km) north of the impact area, indicating the aircraft started to break-up before impact. The ice was disrupted at the point of impact, temporarily exposing an area of seawater approximately 160 feet (50 m) in diameter; ice floes in the area were scattered, upturned and displaced. South of the impact area, a 400-foot (120 m) by 2,200-foot (670 m) blackened patch was visible where fuel from the aircraft had burned—this area was highly contaminated with JP-4 aviation fuel and radioactive elements that included plutonium, uranium, americium and tritium. Plutonium levels as high as 380 mg/m^{2} were registered in the area.

Radioactive materials at the accident site
Nuclide	Half-life	Type of radiation
Uranium-238	4.5 billion years	Alpha
Uranium-235	700 million years	Alpha
Uranium-234	250,000 years	Alpha
Plutonium-239	24,000 years	Alpha
Americium-241	430 years	Alpha/Gamma
Plutonium-240	6,600 years	Alpha
Plutonium-241	14 years	Beta
Tritium	12 years	Beta

American and Danish officials immediately launched "Project Crested Ice" (informally known as "Dr. Freezelove" (Note: "Dr. Freezelove" is an apparent play on words of the 1964 film "Dr. Strangelove".)), a clean-up operation to remove the debris and contain environmental damage. Despite the cold, dark Arctic winter, there was considerable pressure to complete the clean-up operation before the sea ice melted in the spring and deposited further contaminants into the sea.

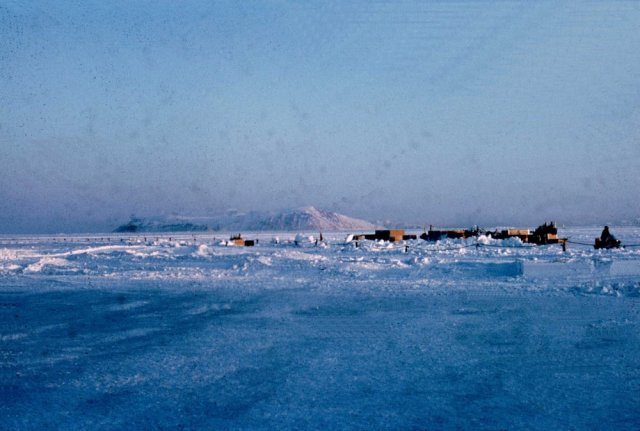
Camp Hunziker was set up at the accident site

Weather conditions at the site were extreme; the average temperature was −40 °F (−40 °C), at times dropping to −76 °F (−60 °C). These temperatures were accompanied by winds of up to 89 miles per hour (40 m/s). Equipment suffered high failure-rates and batteries worked for shorter periods in the cold; operators modified their scientific instruments to allow the battery packs to be carried under their coats to extend the batteries' lifespan. The operation was conducted in arctic darkness until 14 February, when sunlight gradually began appearing.

A base camp (named "Camp Hunziker" after Richard Overton Hunziker, the USAF general in charge of the operation) was created at the crash site; it included a heliport, igloos, generators and communications facilities. A "zero line" delineating the 1-mile (1.6 km) by 3-mile (4.8 km) area in which alpha particle contamination could be measured was established by 25 January, four days after the crash. The line was subsequently used to control decontamination of personnel and vehicles. An ice road was constructed to Thule from the site. This was followed by a second, more direct road so that the ice on the first road was not fatigued by overuse. The camp later included a large prefabricated building, two ski-mounted buildings, several huts, a decontamination trailer and a latrine. These facilities allowed for 24-hour operations at the crash site.

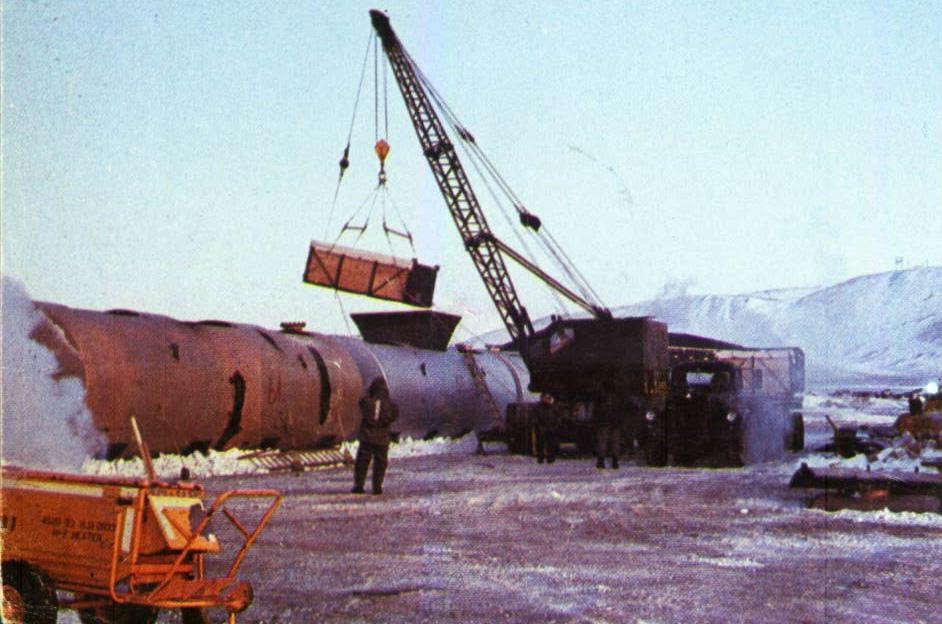
Contaminated ice being loaded into steel tanks at Thule during Project Crested Ice

The USAF worked with Danish nuclear scientists to consider the clean-up options. The spilled fuel in the blackened area was heavily contaminated, raising concerns that when the ice melted in the summer, the radioactive fuel would float on the sea and subsequently contaminate the shore. The Danes thus insisted on the removal of the blackened area to avoid this possibility. The Danes also requested that the nuclear material not be left in Greenland after the cleanup operation was complete, therefore requiring Hunziker to remove the contaminated ice and wreckage to the United States for disposal. USAF personnel used graders to collect the contaminated snow and ice, which was loaded into wooden boxes at the crash site. The boxes were moved to a holding area near Thule Air Base known as the "Tank Farm". There, contaminated material was loaded into steel tanks prior to being loaded onto ships. Debris from the weapons was sent to the Pantex plant in Texas for evaluation, and the tanks were shipped to Savannah River in South Carolina. According to Hunziker, 93 percent of the contaminated material was removed from the accident site.

In 1987–88 and again in 2000, reports surfaced in the Danish press that one of the bombs had not been recovered. SAC stated at the time of the accident that all four bombs were destroyed. In 2008, the BBC published an article that was based on its examination of partly declassified documents obtained some years earlier, via the United States Freedom of Information Act. The documents appeared to confirm that within weeks of the accident, investigators realized only three of the weapons could be accounted for. One of the declassified documents—dated to January 1968—details a blackened section of ice which had refrozen with shroud lines from a weapon parachute: "Speculate something melted through the ice such as burning primary or secondary". (Note: The "primary" and "secondary" refer to parts of the weapon.) A July 1968 report states, "An analysis by the AEC of the recovered secondary components indicates recovery of 85 percent of the uranium and 94 percent, by weight, of three secondaries. No parts of the fourth secondary have been identified".

The BBC tracked down several officials involved in the accident's aftermath. One was William H. Chambers, a former nuclear-weapons designer at the Los Alamos National Laboratory. Chambers headed a team dealing with nuclear accidents, including the Thule crash. He explained the logic behind the decision to abandon the search: "There was disappointment in what you might call a failure to return all of the components ... it would be very difficult for anyone else to recover classified pieces if we couldn't find them".

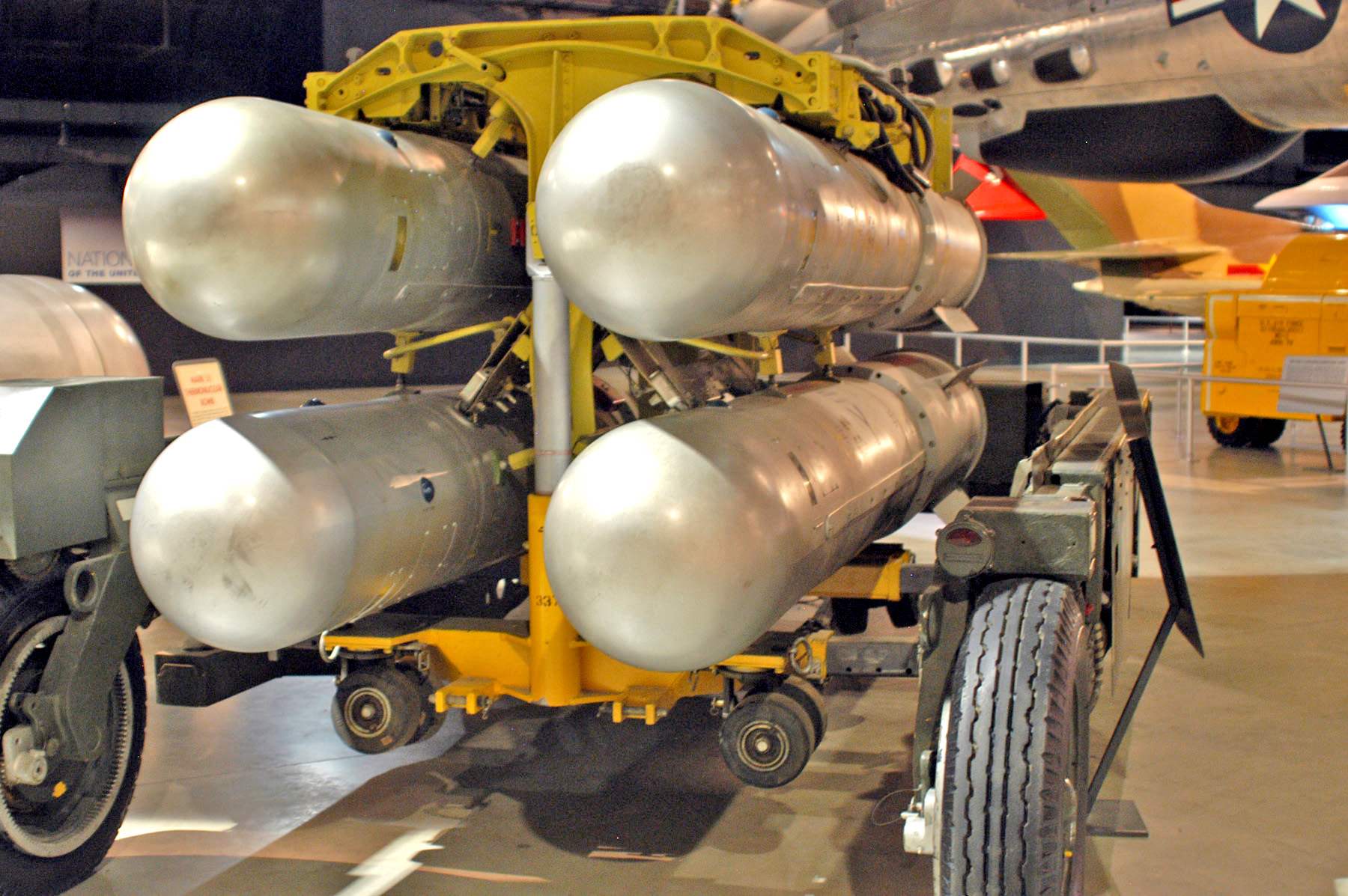
Set of four B28FI thermonuclear bombs of the same type as those in the accident at Thule

In August 1968, the United States military sent a Star III mini-submarine to the base to look for weapon debris, especially the uranium-235 fissile core of a primary. A much bigger operation at Palomares off the coast of Spain two years earlier led to the recovery of a lost nuclear weapon from the Mediterranean Sea; the B28FI bomb was lost for 80 days after a mid-air collision between a B-52 on a "Chrome Dome" mission and its KC-135 Stratotanker refueling aircraft. Christensen asserts that the purpose of the underwater search at Thule was obvious to the Danish authorities, contrary to other reports that suggested its true purpose had been hidden from them. At lower levels, however, the dives were surrounded by some confidentiality. One document from July 1968 reads, "Fact that this operation includes search for object or missing weapon part is to be treated as Confidential NOFORN", meaning it was not to be disclosed to non-US nationals. It continues, "For discussion with Danes, this operation should be referred to as a survey, repeat survey of bottom under impact point". Further indications of the search are apparent in a September 1968 interim report by the United States Atomic Energy Commission, which stated, "It was further speculated that the missing <redacted>, in view of its ballistic characteristics, may have come to rest beyond the observed concentration of heavy debris". This discussion was a reference to the unsuccessful search for the uranium cylinder of one of the secondaries.

The underwater search was beset by technical problems and eventually abandoned. Diagrams and notes included in the declassified documents make clear it was not possible to search the entire area where crash debris had spread. Four bomb reservoirs, one nearly intact secondary, and parts equaling two secondaries were recovered on the sea ice; parts equaling one secondary were not accounted for. The search also revealed a weapon cable fairing, polar cap, and a one-foot by three-foot section of a warhead's ballistic case.

The USAF monitored airborne contamination through nasal swabs of onsite personnel. Of the 9,837 nasal swabs taken, 335 samples had detectable levels of alpha particle activity, although none exceeded acceptable levels. Urinalysis was also performed but none of the 756 samples displayed any detectable level of plutonium.

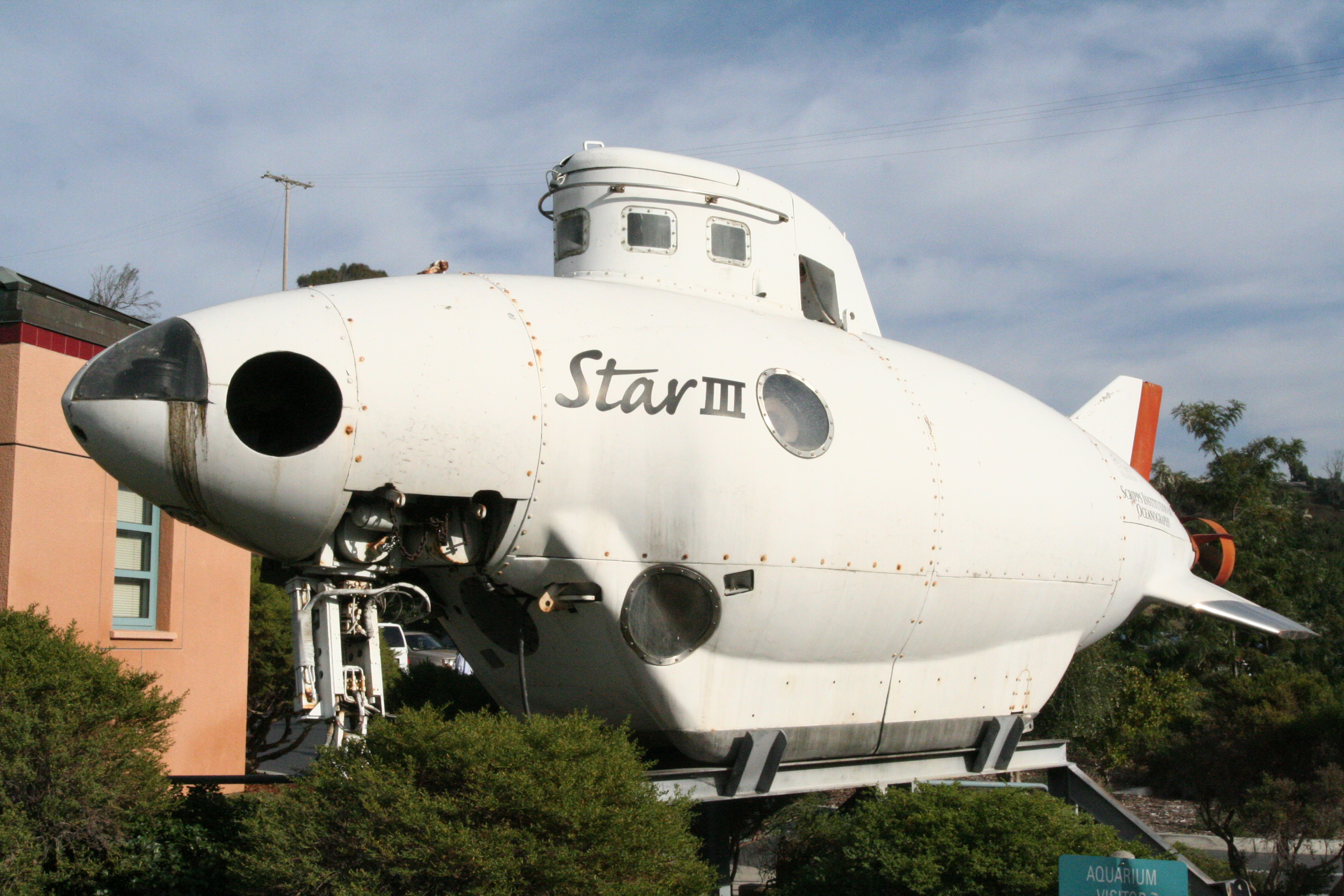
Star III submersible used in the underwater search for missing bomb components

By the time the operation concluded, 700 specialized personnel from both countries and more than 70 United States government agencies had worked for nine months to clean up the site, often without adequate protective clothing or decontamination measures. In total, more than 550,000 US gallons (2,100 m^{3}) of contaminated liquid—along with thirty tanks of miscellaneous material, some of it contaminated—were collected at the Tank Farm. Project Crested Ice ended on 13 September 1968 when the last tank was loaded onto a ship bound for the United States. The operation is estimated to have cost $9.4 million ($87 million as of 2025).

== Aftermath ==
=== Operation Chrome Dome ===
The accident caused controversy at the time and in the years since. It highlighted the risks Thule Air Base posed to Greenlanders from nuclear accidents and potential superpower conflicts. The accident, which occurred two years after the Palomares crash, signaled the immediate end of the airborne alert program, which had become untenable because of the political and operational risks involved. Scott Sagan, a political science academic and anti-nuclear writer, postulated that if the HOBO 28 monitoring aircraft had crashed into the BMEWS early warning array instead of Baffin Bay, it would have presented NORAD with a scenario (radio link to "Hard Head" aircraft and BMEWS both dead, no nuclear detonation detected) that also matched that of a surprise conventional missile attack on Thule, leaving the unreliable submarine telecommunications cable between Thule and the US mainland as the only source of information to the contrary. A satellite communications link was set up in 1974.

According to Greenpeace, the United States and USSR were concerned enough by accidents such as the 1961 Goldsboro B-52 crash, the 1966 Palomares B-52 crash and the Thule accident that they agreed to take measures to ensure that a future nuclear accident would not lead the other party to conclude incorrectly that a first-strike was under way. Consequently, on 30 September 1971, the two superpowers signed the "Agreement on Measures to Reduce the Risk of Nuclear War". Each party agreed to notify the other immediately in the event of an accidental, unauthorized or unexplained incident involving a nuclear weapon that could increase the risk of nuclear war. They agreed to use the Moscow–Washington hotline, which was upgraded at the same time, for any communications.

By April 1964, on-alert bomber missions were in decline as American strategy favored unmanned delivery via ICBMs.

=== Weapon safety ===
Following the Palomares and Thule accidents, investigators concluded the high explosive (HE) used in nuclear weapons was not chemically stable enough to withstand the forces involved in an aircraft accident. They also determined that the electrical circuits of the weapons' safety devices became unreliable in a fire and allowed connections to short circuit. The findings triggered research by scientists in the United States into safer conventional explosives and fireproof casings for nuclear weapons.

The Lawrence Livermore National Laboratory developed the "Susan Test", which uses a special projectile whose design simulates an aircraft accident by squeezing and nipping explosive material between its metal surfaces. The test projectile is fired under controlled conditions at a hard surface to measure the reactions and thresholds of different explosives to an impact. By 1979, the Los Alamos National Laboratory developed a new, safer type of explosive, called insensitive high explosive (IHE), for use in U.S. nuclear weapons; the physicist and nuclear weapons designer Ray Kidder speculated that the weapons in the Palomares and Thule accidents would probably not have detonated had IHE been available at the time.

=== "Thulegate" political scandal ===
Denmark's nuclear-free zone policy originated in 1957, when the coalition government decided in the lead-up to the Paris NATO summit not to stockpile nuclear weapons on its soil in peacetime. The presence of the bomber in Greenland airspace in 1968 therefore triggered public suspicions and accusations that the policy was being violated. The nature of the "Hard Head" missions was suppressed at the time of the accident; the Danish and American governments instead claimed the bomber was not on a routine mission over Greenland and that it diverted there because of a one-off emergency. United States documents declassified in the 1990s contradicted the Danish government's position, and therefore resulted in a 1995 political scandal that the press dubbed "Thulegate".

The Danish parliament commissioned a report from the Danish Institute of International Affairs (DUPI) (Note: Dansk Udenrigspolitisk Institut.) to determine the history of United States nuclear overflights of Greenland and the role of Thule Air Base in this regard. When the two-volume work was published on 17 January 1997 it confirmed that the nuclear-armed flights over Greenland were recurrent, but that the United States had acted in good faith. The report blamed Danish Prime Minister H. C. Hansen for intentionally introducing ambiguity in the Danish–U.S. security agreement: he was not asked about, nor did he mention, the official Danish nuclear policy when meeting with the United States ambassador in 1957 to discuss Thule Air Base. Hansen followed up the discussion with an infamous letter pointing out that the issue of "supplies of munition of a special kind" was not raised during the discussion, but that he had nothing further to add. In doing so, the report concluded, he tacitly gave the United States the go-ahead to store nuclear weapons at Thule.

The report also confirmed that the United States stockpiled nuclear weapons in Greenland until 1965, contradicting assurances by Danish foreign minister Niels Helveg Petersen that the weapons were in Greenland's airspace, but never on the ground. The DUPI report also revealed details of Project Iceworm, a hitherto secret United States Army plan to store up to 600 nuclear missiles under the Greenland ice cap.

=== Workers' compensation claims ===
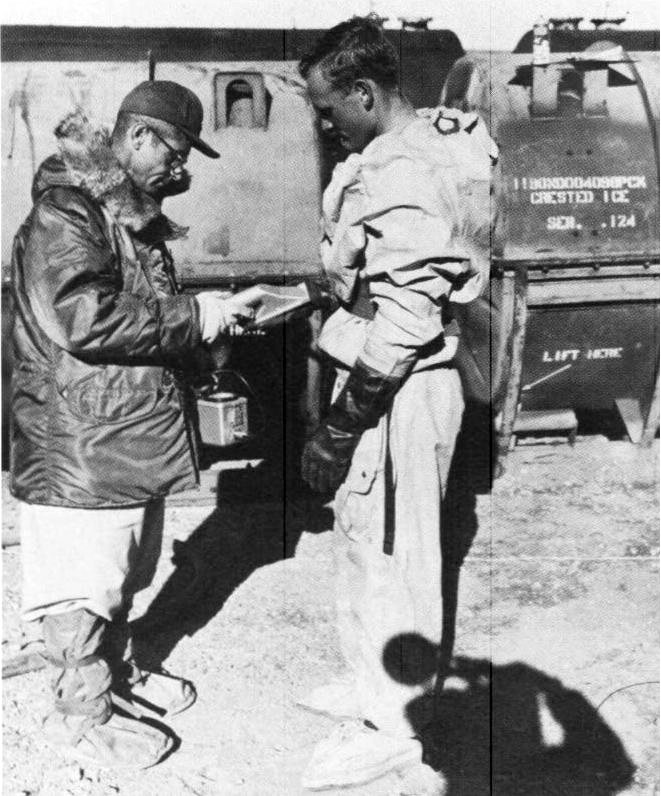
A monitor checks a pump operator for radioactive contamination

Danish workers involved in the clean-up operation claimed long-term health problems resulted from their exposure to the radiation. Although they did not work at Camp Hunziker, the Danes worked at the Tank Farm where the contaminated ice was collected, in the port from which the contaminated debris was shipped, and also serviced the vehicles used in the clean-up. It is also possible that they were exposed to radiation in the local atmosphere. Many of the workers surveyed in the years following Project Crested Ice reported health problems. A 1995 survey found 410 deaths by cancers out of a sample of 1,500 workers.

In 1986, Danish Prime Minister Poul Schlüter commissioned a radiological examination of the surviving workers. The Danish Institute for Clinical Epidemiology concluded 11 months later that cancer incidents were 40 percent higher in Project Crested Ice workers than in workers who had visited the base before and after the operation. The Institute of Cancer Epidemiology found a 50 percent higher cancer rate in the workers than in the general population, but could not conclude that radiation exposure was to blame.

In 1987, almost 200 former cleanup workers took legal action against the United States. The action was unsuccessful, but resulted in the release of hundreds of classified documents. The documents revealed that USAF personnel involved in the clean-up were not subsequently monitored for health problems, despite the likelihood of greater exposure to radiation than the Danes. The United States has since instigated regular examinations of its workers. In 1995, the Danish government paid 1,700 workers compensation of 50,000 kroner each.

Danish workers' health has not been regularly monitored, despite a European Court directive to the Danish government to begin examinations in the year 2000, and a May 2007 European Parliament resolution instructing the same. In 2008, the Association of Former Thule Workers took the case to the European courts. The petitioners claimed that Denmark's failure to comply with the rulings led to delays in detecting their illnesses, resulting in worsened prognoses. The country joined the European Atomic Energy Community in 1973, and is therefore not legally bound by the European treaty with respect to events in 1968: "When the accident occurred, Denmark was not a Member State and could not therefore be considered as being bound by the Community legislation applicable at that time. The obligations of Denmark towards the workers and the population likely to be affected by the accident could only flow from national legislation."

The Danish government rejected a link between the accident and long-term health issues. Dr. Kaare Ulbak of the Danish National Institute of Radiation Protection said, "We have very good registers for cancer incidents and cancer mortality and we have made a very thorough investigation." The workers said the lack of proof was attributable to the lack of appropriate medical monitoring. As of November 2008, the case has been unsuccessful. A 2011 report by the Danish National Board of Health found that "the total radiation dose for representative persons in the Thule area for plutonium contamination resulting from the 1968 Thule accident is lower than the recommended reference level, even under extreme conditions and situations."

=== Scientific studies ===
Radioactive contamination occurred particularly in the marine environment. The fissile material in the weapons consisted mostly of uranium-235, while the radioactive debris consists of at least two different "source terms". (Note: The "source term" is the measure of radioactive contamination released during an accident.) Scientific monitoring of the site has been carried out periodically, with expeditions in 1968, 1970, 1974, 1979, 1984, 1991, 1997 and 2003.

A 1997 international expedition of mainly Danish and Finnish scientists carried out a comprehensive sediment sampling program in North Star Bay. The main conclusions were: plutonium has not moved from the contaminated sediments into the surface water in the shelf sea; the debris has been buried to a great depth in the sediment as a result of biological activity; transfer of plutonium to benthic biota is low. Other research indicates that uranium is leaching from the contaminated particles faster than plutonium and americium. Research conducted in 2003 concluded, "Plutonium in the marine environment at Thule presents an insignificant risk to man. Most plutonium remains in the seabed under Bylot Sound far from man under relatively stable conditions and concentrations of plutonium in seawater and animals are low. However, the plutonium contamination of surface soil at Narsaarsuk could constitute a small risk to humans visiting the location if radioactive particles are resuspended in the air so that they might be inhaled". In 2003, 2007 and 2008, the first samples were taken on land by the Risø National Laboratory—the findings were published in 2011.

=== Literature review of declassified documents ===
A BBC News report in 2008 confirmed through declassified documents and interviews with those involved that a bomb had been lost. The Danish foreign ministry reviewed the 348 documents that the BBC obtained in 2001 under the Freedom of Information Act. In January 2009, foreign minister Per Stig Møller commissioned a study by the Danish Institute for International Studies (DIIS) to compare the 348 documents with 317 documents released by the Department of Energy in 1994 in order to determine if the 348 documents contained any new information about an intact nuclear weapon at Thule. In August 2009, DIIS published its report, which contradicted the assertions of the BBC. The report concluded that there was no missing bomb, and that the American underwater operation was a search for the uranium-235 of the fissile core of a secondary. For the first time, the report was able to present an estimate of the amount of plutonium contained in the pits of the primaries.

== See also ==
- List of military nuclear accidents
- The Idealist – 2015 Danish thriller/drama dealing with the health compensation claims
- Broken Arrow (1996 film) - 1996 American action-thriller film directed by John Woo featuring a fictional similar situation
