= Narsaarsuk =

Abandoned settlement in Greenland

Coordinates: 76°26′24″N 69°22′12″W

Location within Greenland

Narsaarsuk (old spelling: Narssârssuk) is an abandoned settlement on the edge of Bylot Sound in northern Greenland near Pituffik Space Base.

== History ==
Narsaarsuk was inhabited in the 19th century. It was abandoned by 1918.

In 1968, the site of the former settlement was contaminated with plutonium after the 1968 Thule Air Base B-52 crash, and to this day the area remains contaminated.

In 1987, a warehouse was built at Narsaarsuk since about 10 Inughuit families lived and hunted there in the winter.
