= HMS North Star (1824) =

Atholl-class sixth-rate post ship

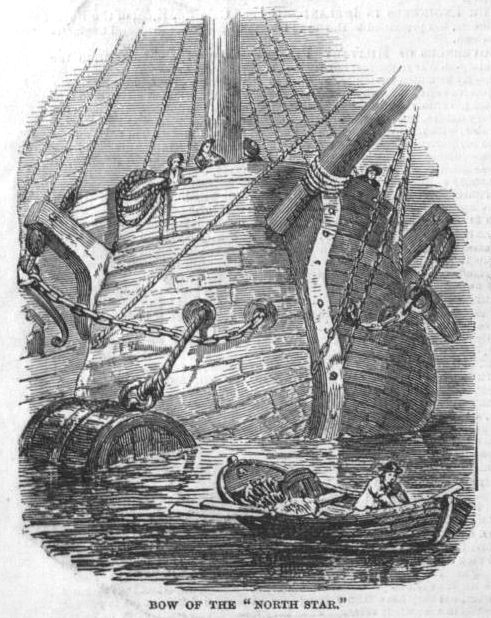
- Bow of the North Star. Illustrated London News 1849

History

United Kingdom
- Name: North Star
- Ordered: 30 April 1818
- Builder: Woolwich Dockyard
- Laid down: April 1820
- Launched: 7 February 1824
- Completed: 26 May 1826
- Fate: Broken up at Chatham Dockyard in 1860

General characteristics
- Class & type: 28-gun Atholl-class sixth-rate post ship
- Tons burthen: 501 bm
- Length: 113 ft 8 in (34.65 m) (gundeck); 94 ft 8.75 in (28.8735 m) (keel)
- Beam: 31 ft 6 in (9.60 m)
- Depth of hold: 8 ft 9 in (2.67 m)
- Sail plan: Full-rigged ship
- Complement: 175
- Armament: 28 guns: Upper Deck: 20 × 32-pdr carronades; Quarterdeck: 6 × 18-pdr carronades; Forecasle: 2 × 9-pdr guns

HMS North Star was a 28-gun Atholl-class sixth-rate post ship built to an 1817 design by the Surveyors of the Navy. She was launched in 1824. North Star Bay, a bay in Greenland, was named in honour of this ship.

== Suppressing the Atlantic slave trade ==
From 1826 to 1828 under Captain Arabin, North Star was stationed in the West Africa Squadron, whose task was to suppress the Atlantic slave trade by patrolling the coast of West Africa. In late 1828 she sailed to England, via the West Indies. From 1829 to 1832 she was stationed in Portsmouth; then from 1832 to 1833 she became part of the North America and West Indies Station before being paid off. In 1834 she was commissioned for service on the Pacific Station then known as the South American Station. She was in the Pacific off the coast of South and Central America until 1836, when she returned to Portsmouth.

== First Anglo-Chinese War ==
In September 1841 Captain Sir James Everard Home was appointed to North Star. She was then commissioned for service in the East Indies and China Station and in November of that year she conveyed money for the commissariat in China. During the period 1841-42 she served with Sir William Parker's ships in the First Anglo-Chinese War (1839–42), known popularly as the First Opium War.

== Service in the Flagstaff War in New Zealand ==
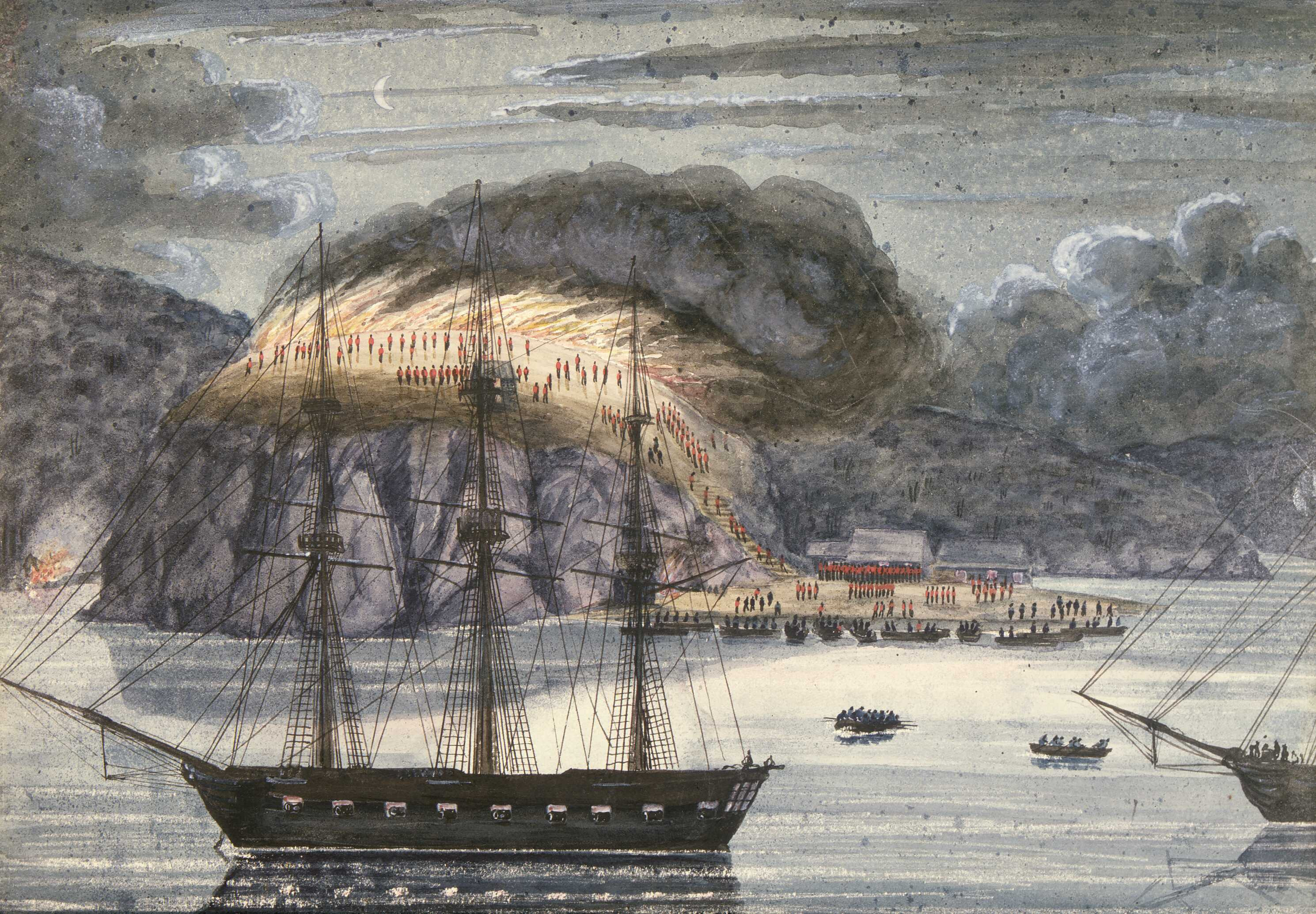
Lt Col Hulme burns Otuihu whilst Pomare is held on board HMS North Star, 30 April 1845. Artist: John Williams, 58th Regt, 1845. Alexander Turnbull Library

At the end of the First Anglo-Chinese War North Star was sent to Calcutta, then Sydney, Australia, and when at Sydney, the Flagstaff War began in New Zealand.

On 23 March 1845 North Star arrived in New Zealand, under the command of Sir Everard Home, with the officers and men of the 58th Regt. North Star operated in the Bay of Islands in New Zealand during the Flagstaff War between 11 March 1845 and 11 January 1846. On 29 April 1845 cannon fire from North Star was directed at the pā of Pōmare II on the coast in the Bay of Islands. A pā is a fortified village. Because of the almost constant intertribal warfare, the art of defensive fortifications had reached a very high level among the Māori. The colonial forces were able to occupy Pōmare's pā without a fight, although up until that time Pōmare had been considered neutral and was not a supporter of the rebellion led by Hōne Heke.

On 8 May 1845 a small naval brigade from both North Star and HMS Hazard supported the 58th Regt. and other colonial forces at the Battle of Puketutu. The colonial forces were repulsed by Māori warriors with serious losses. From 27 December 1845 to 11 January 1846 officers, seamen and Royal Marines from North Star assisted the army at the siege of Ruapekapeka Pā. Lieutenant Charles Randle Egerton, HMS North Star, was present at this battle. Mr Murray, midshipman, HMS North Star, was severely wounded, not dangerously, during the battle.

Following the end of the Flagstaff War North Star returned to England. On 19 December 1846 she arrived in Portsmouth sailing via the Cape of Good Hope.

== Arctic expedition ==
Under Commander James Saunders North Star sailed to the Arctic in 1849 in the spring on a venture to search for and resupply Captain Sir James Clark Ross' expedition, who in turn had sailed in 1848 trying to locate the whereabouts of Sir John Franklin's expedition.

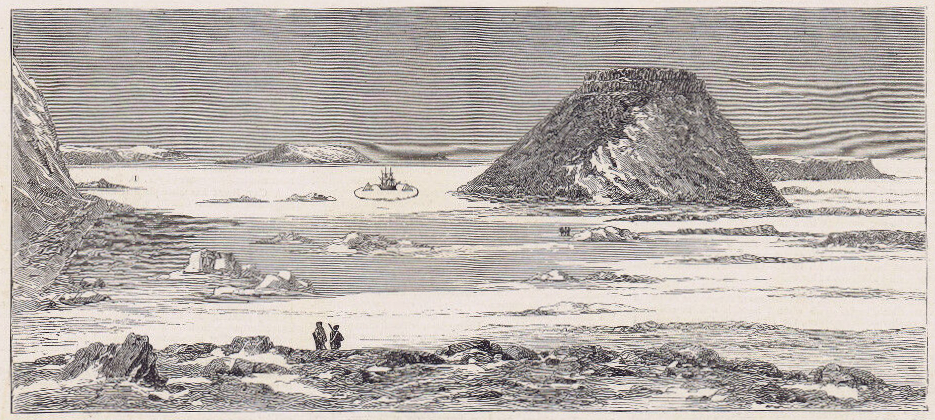
North Star Bay, Wolstenholme Sound, showing the winter quarters of HMS North Star, 1849–50. The Graphic, 1875

Failing to find Franklin or Ross, Saunders's mission aboard North Star consisted in depositing stores along several named areas of the Canadian Arctic coast and returning to England before the onset of winter. However, progress being made difficult by ice in Melville Bay James Saunders's ship became trapped by ice off the coast of northwest Greenland in North Star Bay, a protected bay off Wolstenholme Fjord, being the first Royal Navy ship to winter so far north. While wintering in the frozen bay in 1849–50 Saunders named numerous landmarks in that area.

In August 1850 North Star broke free of the ice and crossed Baffin Bay to Lancaster Sound, eventually reaching Whaler Point. Since westward progress became difficult on account of the ice Saunders returned to Baffin Bay and off Admiralty Inlet, he met William Penny's expedition and was informed that Ross had returned home. After leaving the remaining stores at Navy Board Inlet, North Star sailed back to England.

She was immediately attached to Edward Belcher's 1852 Franklin search expedition and returned to the arctic under William Pullen. Left at Beechey Island, she served as depot ship and when the remainder of the expedition was frozen in and abandoned, she and HMS Phoenix brought off the crews of Belcher's four other ships as well as that of HMS Investigator, returning again to England in 1854. In 1860 she was broken up at the Chatham Dockyard.

== Sources ==
- Colledge, J. J.; Warlow, Ben (2006) [1969]. Ships of the Royal Navy: The Complete Record of All Fighting Ships of the Royal Navy from the 15th Century to the Present (3rd Rev ed.). London: Chatham Publishing. ISBN 978-1-86176-281-8. OCLC 67375475.
- Lyon, David & Winfield, Rif (2004). The Sail and Steam Navy List: All the Ships of the Royal Navy 1815–1889. Chatham Publishing. ISBN 978-1-86176-032-6. OCLC 52620555.
