= Rodriguez well =

Water well operated using heated water

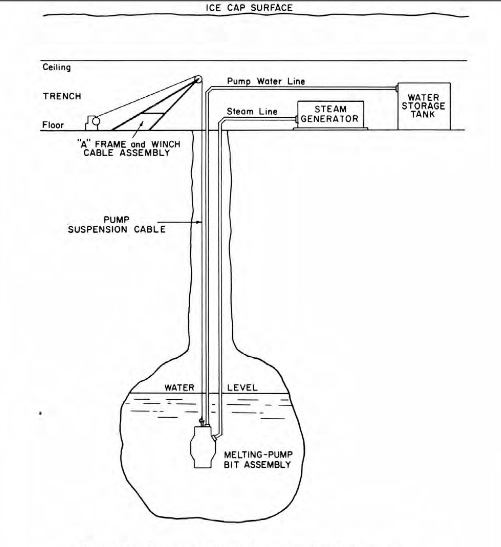
Cross section of Rodriguez well

A Rodriguez well (or Rodwell) is a type of well envisioned by Swiss glaciologist Henri Bader of Rutgers University and developed by engineer Raul Rodriguez of the United States Army for economical harvesting of drinking water in polar areas. The project began as a subproject of the Army's Camp Century base in Greenland, created as a demonstration for affordable ice-cap military outposts or bases for scientific research.

== Background ==
U.S. Army engineer Raúl Rodríguez-Torrent (1921-1985) was born in Rio Piedras, Puerto Rico in August 1921. In 1940 he enlisted in the U.S. Army and later became an engineer at the United States Army Corps of Engineers (USACE).

Developed at Camp Century in Greenland during the early 1960s, a Rodriguez Well (Rodwell), uses heat exchangers and a submersible pump to create a cavity deep under a glacier’s surface and cycle the heated water up an ice shaft, siphoning a portion of the flow for consumption before sending the rest back down to the well. Camp Century was a preliminary camp for Project Iceworm whose end goal was to install a vast network of nuclear missile launch sites that could survive a first strike. If this model were found to be effective, an efficient means of supplying water to staff stationed on site needed to be developed. Project Iceworm was a top secret United States Army program of the Cold War, which aimed to build a network of mobile nuclear missile launch sites under the Greenland ice sheet. The ultimate objective of placing medium-range missiles under the ice — close enough to strike targets within the Soviet Union — was kept secret from the Government of Denmark.

== Means of operation ==
Heated water is used to melt a shaft over a hundred feet deep, eventually forming a cavity beneath the surface at the point where the shaft ends. By continuously replenishing this pool of heated water, the deep pocket of melted water gradually expands, renewing the supply of fresh water available to be pumped to the surface. The process was inspired by the observation that room temperature sewage injected into the arctic surface eventually formed a pocket around 100 feet down which would not refreeze as long as more sewage was continuously injected. The lifespan of a Rodriguez well is over seven years, ending when the depth of the cavity becomes too deep for the facility to efficiently heat and recirculate water.

== Current uses ==
Rodriguez wells were driven at the National Science Foundation's Amundsen–Scott South Pole Station for fresh water and waste disposal purposes.

History of Rodwell Systems at Amundsen–Scott South Pole Station
Rodwell	Construction Completed	Years of Operation (Drinking Water)	Years of Operation (Wastewater Disposal)	Current Status
Experimental	1972	1972–1973	Unknown	Experimental well operated only for a three-month period
Rodwell-1	1993	1995–2003	2003–2012	Emergency and intermediate wastewater outfalls used between 2012–2014
Rodwell-2	2002	2003–2012	2014–2025	Reached capacity as a wastewater outfall; emergency and intermediate outfalls used until Rodwell-3 can be converted for wastewater disposal
Rodwell-3	2007	2012–present	2030 (projected)	Reaching capacity as a potable water source; planned conversion to a wastewater outfall
Rodwell-4	2030 (projected)	2030 (projected)	N/A	Planned for construction as a potable water source

== Potential use on Mars ==
NASA is presently working with the Cold Regions Research and Engineering Laboratory of the US Army Corps of Engineers to design a proof of concept of a Rodriguez well usable in polar regions of Mars.

== See also ==
- Bader Glacier
