= Camp Fistclench =

U.S. Army research camp in Greenland

Coordinates: 76°10′N 55°21′W

- Part of Project Iceworm

Site information
- Owner: United States Army

Location

Site history
- In use: 1957–1960

Camp Fistclench (Fist Clench) was a U.S. Army research camp on and inside the Greenland Ice Cap 200 miles (320 km) east of Thule Air Base. It was in use from 1957 to 1960. It served to test techniques used at the much larger Camp Century.

== History ==
The U.S. Army initiated a research and development program to facilitate sustained military operations in the far north in 1953. This included a Greenland Research and Development Program. Northern latitudes acquired strategic importance during the Cold War owing to their being the shortest path between the Soviet Union and the United States for bombers and missiles. The purpose of the Greenland Research and Development Program was to identify solutions to "engineering and associated problems" required to develop, maintain and supply camps on the Greenland ice cap. In 1953, a team of Army scientists visited Greenland to consider the specific problem areas for construction of camps on the ice cap. These problems included the use of snow as a construction material, foundations on snow, the control of snow and issues of habitation including power, water supply and wastewater.

Field investigations began in 1954 at Site II (designated "Fistclench"), located 220 miles (350 km) east of Thule Air Force Base at an elevation of 6,800 feet on the ice cap. The investigation explored the feasibility of using a tracked Swiss highway-sized snow blower (referred to in reports as the "Peter snow miller") to bore into the ice cap. The success of this effort led to the establishment of a subsurface camp, called "Camp Fistclench" in 1957. The Corps of Engineers assigned the following U.S. Army research organizations to the project: Snow, Ice and Permafrost Research Establishment (SIPRE), Arctic Construction and Frost Effects Laboratory (ACFEL), Engineer Research and Development Laboratories (ERDL), and the Waterways Experiment Station (WES). SIPRE and ACFEL were the antecedent organizations to the Cold Regions Research and Engineering Laboratory (CRREL).

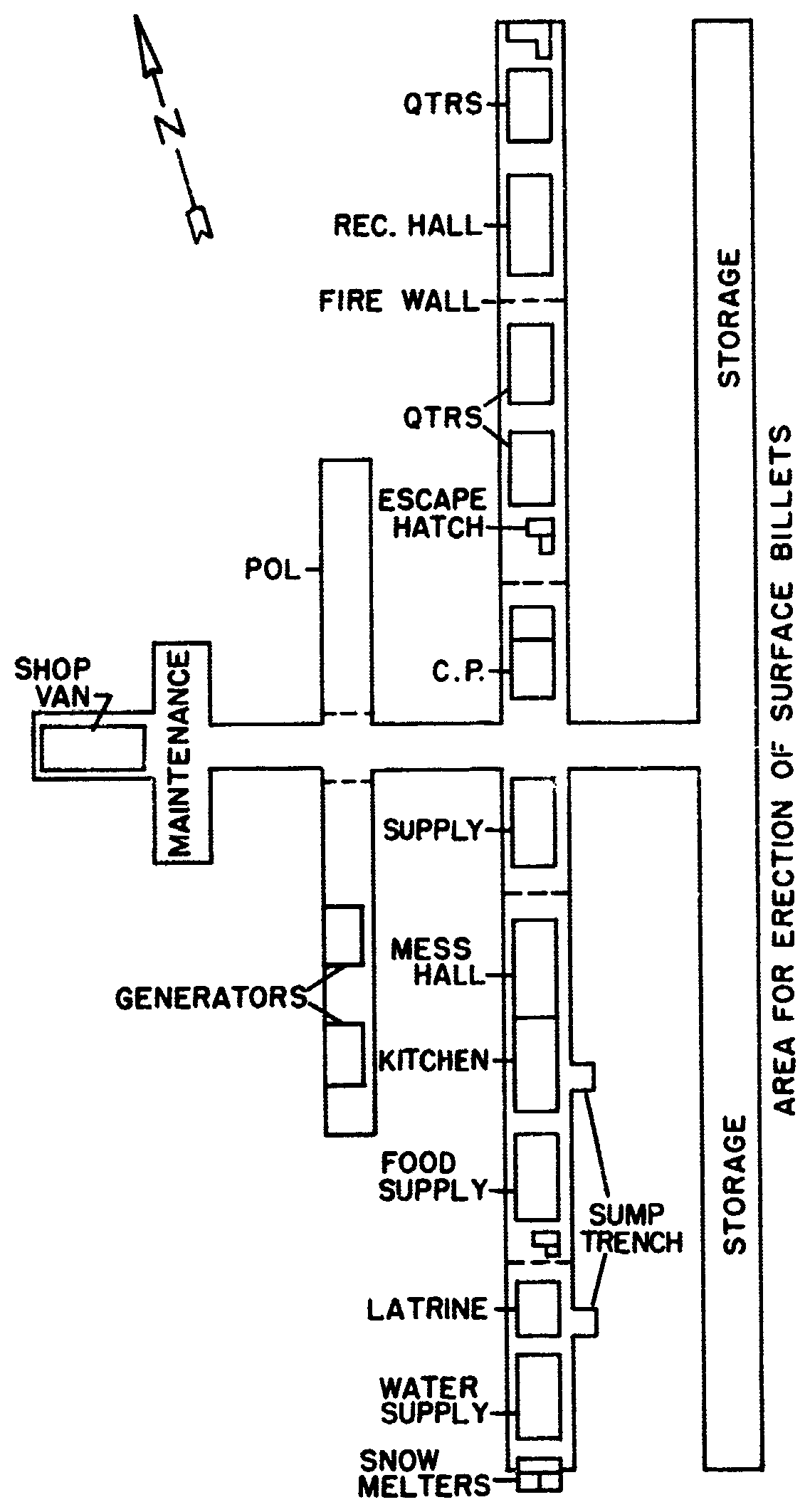
Layout plan of Camp Fistclench

In 1955, the USAF had prepared a compacted snow runway near Site II. In May 1957, a crew of one officer and 27 men arrived and began setting up camp to support the construction of Camp Fistclench. Heavy supplies arrived over-ice in convoys of tracked vehicles. The engineers used a Peter snow miller to tunnel through the ice. The largest of five trenches, 600 feet long, contained living quarters and utilities and was 20 feet wide and 8 feet high. Prefab buildings were installed inside. Corrugated steel arches covered the ceiling, and snow was blown back over the trenches to form the roof. Jamesway huts were used as additional shelter both above and below ice. There were two diesel generators. As a trial operation, Fistclench was not used for overwintering troops, but it housed several dozen during the summer. The large amount of fuel needed to operate Fist Clench influenced the choice to use a nuclear reactor at Camp Century. Construction of Century began in 1959, and Camp Fistclench was abandoned, having served as a prototype for the larger camp.

In 1957, a group of scientists came to Camp Fistclench to observe sunspot activity as a part of the International Geophysical Year studies.

== See also ==
- Project Iceworm
- Camp TUTO
