= Project Iceworm =

Top-secret Cold War United States Army program

Coordinates: 77°10′N 61°08′W

Greenland

Project Iceworm was a top secret United States Army program of the Cold War, which aimed to build a network of mobile nuclear missile launch sites under the Greenland ice sheet. The goal was to install a vast network of nuclear missile launch sites that could survive a first strike, according to the Danish Institute for International Studies, which obtained declassified documents in 1996. The missiles, which could strike targets within the Soviet Union, were never fielded and necessary consent from the Danish government to do so was never obtained.

To study the feasibility of working under the ice, a highly publicized "cover" project, known as Camp Century, was launched in 1959. Unstable ice conditions within the ice sheet caused the project to be canceled in 1966.

== Political background ==
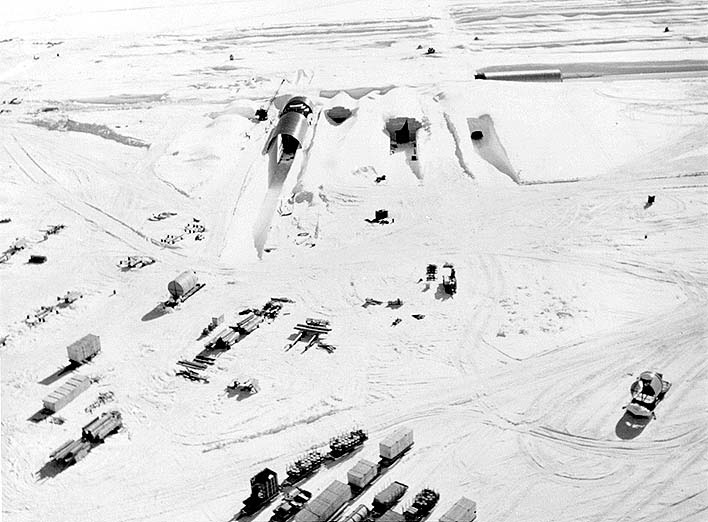
Aerial view of Camp Century, Greenland

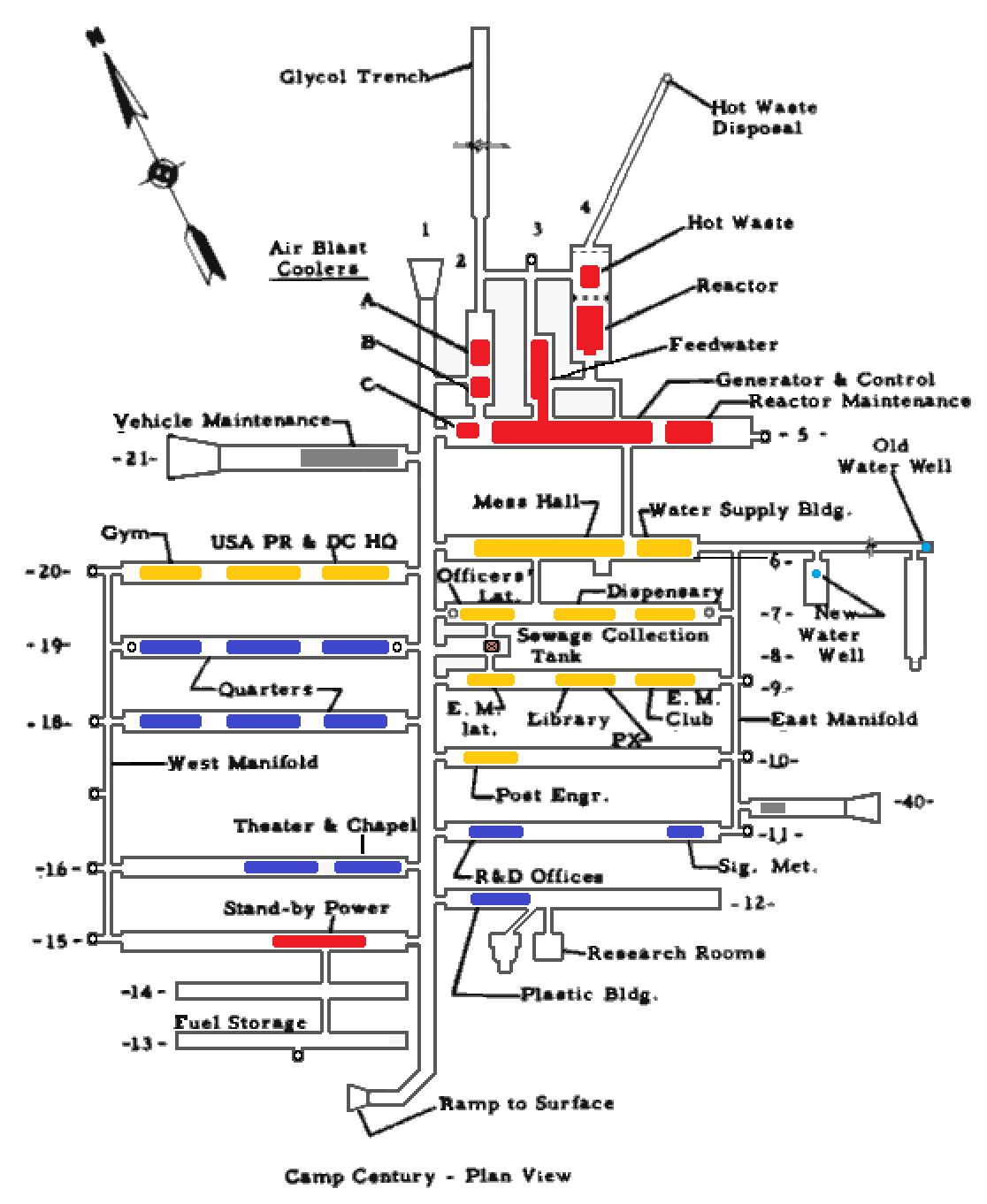
Camp Century layout in color

Details of the missile base project were secret for decades. They first came to light in January 1995 during an enquiry by the Danish Foreign Policy Institute (DUPI) into the history of the use and storage of nuclear weapons in Greenland. The enquiry was ordered by the Parliament of Denmark following the release of previously classified information about the 1968 Thule Air Base B-52 crash that contradicted previous assertions by the Government of Denmark.

== Description ==
To test the feasibility of construction techniques a project site called Camp Century was started by the United States military in 1959, located at an elevation of 6,600 feet (2,000 m) in Northwestern Greenland, 150 miles (240 km) from the American Thule Air Base. The radar and air base at Thule had been active since 1951.

Camp Century was described at the time as a demonstration of affordable ice-cap military outposts. The secret Project Iceworm was to be a system of tunnels 4,000 kilometres (2,500 mi) in length, used to deploy up to 600 nuclear missiles, that would be able to reach the Soviet Union in case of nuclear war. The missile locations would be under the cover of Greenland's ice sheet and were supposed to be periodically changed. While Project Iceworm was secret, plans for Camp Century were discussed with and approved by Denmark. The facility, including its nuclear power plant, was profiled in The Saturday Evening Post magazine in 1960.

The "official purpose" of Camp Century, as explained by the United States Department of Defense to Danish officials in 1960, was to test various construction techniques under Arctic conditions, explore practical problems with a semi-mobile nuclear reactor, as well as supporting scientific experiments on the icecap. A total of 21 trenches were cut and covered with arched roofs within which prefabricated buildings were erected. With a total length of 3,000 metres (1.9 mi), these tunnels also contained a hospital, a shop, a theater and a church. The total number of inhabitants was approximately 200. From 1960 until 1963, the electric supply was provided by the world's first mobile/portable nuclear reactor, designated PM-2A and designed by Alco for the U.S. Army. Water was supplied by Rod wells melting glaciers, and tested for germs such as the plague.

Within three years after it was excavated, ice core samples taken by geologists working at Camp Century demonstrated that the glacier was moving much faster than anticipated and would destroy the tunnels and launch stations in about two years. The facility was evacuated in 1965, and the nuclear generator removed. Project Iceworm was canceled, and Camp Century closed in 1966.

The project generated valuable scientific information and provided scientists with some of the first ice cores, still being used by climatologists as of 2005.

== Size of proposed missile complex ==
According to the documents published by Denmark in 1997, the U.S. Army's "Iceworm" missile network was outlined in a 1960 Army report titled "Strategic Value of the Greenland Icecap". If fully implemented, the project would cover an area of 52,000 square miles (130,000 km^{2}), roughly three times the size of Denmark. The launch complex floors would be 28 feet (8.5 m) below the surface, with the missile launchers even deeper. Clusters of missile launch centers would be spaced 4 miles (6.4 km) apart. New tunnels were to be dug every year, so that after five years there would be thousands of firing positions, among which the several hundred missiles could be rotated. The US Army intended to deploy a shortened, two-stage version of the U.S. Air Force's Minuteman missile, a variant the Army proposed calling the Iceman.

== Sheet ice elasticity ==
Although the Greenland icecap appears, on its surface, to be hard and immobile, snow and ice are viscoelastic materials, which slowly deform over time, depending on temperature and density. Despite its seeming stability, the icecap is in constant, slow movement, spreading outward from the center. This spreading movement, over a year, causes tunnels and trenches to narrow, as their walls deform and bulge, eventually leading to a collapse of the ceiling. By mid-1962, the ceiling of the reactor room within Camp Century had dropped and had to be lifted 5 feet (1.5 m). During a planned reactor shutdown for maintenance in late July 1963, the Army decided to operate Camp Century as a summer-only camp. It did not reactivate the PM-2A reactor. The camp resumed operations in 1964 using its standby diesel power plant, the portable reactor was removed that summer, and the camp was abandoned in 1966.

== Ecological impact ==
When the camp was decommissioned in 1967, its infrastructure and waste were abandoned under the assumption they would be entombed forever by perpetual snowfall. A 2016 study found that the portion of the ice sheet covering Camp Century will start to melt by 2100, if current trends continue. When the ice melts, the camp's infrastructure, as well as remaining biological, chemical and radioactive waste, will re-enter the environment and potentially disrupt nearby ecosystems. This includes 200,000 liters of diesel, PCBs and radioactive waste.

== See also ==
- Camp Century
- Camp Fistclench
- Camp TUTO
- Thule Air Base

== Sources ==
- "Aukstajā karā uzvarēja ledus" [Ice won the Cold War]. Ilustrētā zinātne [Science Illustrated] (in Latvian) (34): 85. September 2008. ISSN 1691-256X.
- Grant, Shelagh (2010). Polar Imperative: A History of Arctic Sovereignty in North America. Douglas & McIntyre. ISBN 978-1-55365-418-6.
- Petersen, Nikolaj (March 2008). "The Iceman That Never Came: 'Project Iceworm', the search for a NATO deterrent, and the Kingdom of Denmark, 1960–1962". Scandinavian Journal of History. 33 (1). doi:10.1080/03468750701449554. S2CID 142526881.
- Suid, Lawrence H. (1990). The Army's Nuclear Power Program: Evolution of a Support Agency. Greenwood Publishing Group. ISBN 978-0-313-27226-4. Camp Century and its PM-2A reactor covered by Suid in "Chapter 5: The Nuclear Power in Full Bloom", pp. 57–80.
- Weiss, Erik D. (Fall 2001). "Cold War Under the Ice: The Army's Bid for a Long-Range Nuclear Role, 1959–1963". Journal of Cold War Studies. 3 (3): 31–58. doi:10.1162/152039701750419501. S2CID 57572588.
- Schrader, Christopher (2016-08-10). "Sauerei unter dem Eis. Ex-Militärbasis könnte Umweltkatastrophe auslösen". Süddeutsche Zeitung. 2016 (184): 16. (online)
