= Camp TUTO =

U.S. Army research camp in Greenland

Coordinates: 76.25°N 68.19°W

Site information
- Owner: United States Army

Location
- Location within Greenland Location within Arctic

Site history
- In use: 1954–1966

Camp TUTO ("Thule Take-Off") was a major U.S. Army operated research camp at the foot of the Greenland ice cap, 18 miles (29 km) east of Thule Air Base. It operated from 1954 to 1966, with revisits for follow-up research.

== History ==
In the 1950s, Army research units became interested in building structures inside permanent ice for protection, survival, and concealment. Close to the Air Force's new base at Thule and within its associated joint Danish-American Defense Area, the Army Corps of Engineers was able to create an extensive infrastructure to try out these ideas.

Initially, from 1952, the Army Transportation Corps participated in cross-icecap supply trains using tracked vehicle convoys, eventually reaching as far as Station Nord on the east coast of Greenland. As the take-off point for the ice cap, the Army Corps of Engineers then built Camp Tuto for its Polar Research and Development Center (PRDC), and the site was used by the Snow, Ice and Permafrost Research Establishment (SIPRE) and its successor the Cold Regions Research and Engineering Laboratory (CRREL). Initially, the responsible agency was known as the 1st Engineer Arctic Task Force (EATF). In September 1958, during the build-up to ice camp construction, Camp Tuto was reportedly home to 450 military personnel, although some were there seasonally. Numerous specialized Army offices conducted research at Tuto. The camp left a sizable legacy in the scientific and technical literature.

== Facilities ==
At an elevation of 1,500 feet (460 m), Camp Tuto had a 2,000-foot (610 m) runway with a hangar for use by Army liaison and light cargo aircraft. A large gravel ramp, over 1 mile (1.6 km) long, was built across the ice cap terminal slope, thus providing tracked vehicles the ability to drive onto the ice cap and proceed to destinations in the interior. Major interior ice camp camps supported were Camp Century, located at about the 138 mile mark inland from Tuto, and Camp Fistclench at Mile 218, colocated with the Air Force's former advance radar station Site 2 (N-34). Along the flag-marked ice route, survival cabins with supply caches were set out at 30 mile intervals, also serving for weather, radio, and search-and-rescue tasks. Due to mapped crevasses, the ice cap route was far from a straight line.

About 0.5 miles (800 m) from Tuto a 1,100-foot (340 m) long ice tunnel was carved into the foot of the ice cap. This wide tunnel had temporary living accommodations, diesel generators, and basic comforts. The temperature inside was found to be 17 °F (−8 °C). To considerable media attention, Camp Tuto Ice Tunnel was officially opened in October 1961.

At the eastern end of the airstrip, Camp Tuto proper had numerous large aluminum-sandwich buildings, some connected with innovative tunnels for weather protection. An ionosphere station was operational until 1966. Initially, the buildings had been Jamesway Huts, but over a hundred permanent structures were eventually built in a grid pattern. The egg-shaped corrugated steel tunnels for personnel access were used in places, probably as tests for Camp Fistclench. A mess hall, supply center, communications center, and a machine shop were on camp. Two doctors and a dentist served as a first medical line before the USAF base hospital.

Nearby satellite camps existed at various times. With a primary interest in engineering and construction, the Army units also assisted the Air Force in ice runway construction trials. Tuto was the transshipment camp for installation and removal of the PM-2A nuclear reactor at Camp Century.

== Legacy ==
Although initially successful, the ice camps were subject to gradual deformation, compression, and subsidence requiring annual repair and realignment operations. Also, by 1966 the Army had different priorities, and Tuto was closed as a permanent camp. By the mid 1970s, activities were reduced to yearly visits for updates on ice deformation. Camp Tuto became a ghost town, although the airstrip, the ice ramp, and for some years also the ice tunnel remained usable. The ice ramp was used for scientific access to the ice cap but has since collapsed and adjacent snow banks give scientific access to the ice cap in the spring, including supply trains to mid-ice sites.

Another smaller camp to the north across Moltke Glacier, now inaccessible, was known as Camp NUTO. It was named for the Nunatarssuaq area, boxed in by two glaciers and the ice cap.
