= Canadian Centre for Climate Modelling and Analysis =

Climatological research institute

The Canadian Centre for Climate Modelling and Analysis (CCCma) is part of the Climate Research Division of Environment Canada and is located at the University of Victoria, Victoria, British Columbia. Its purpose is to develop and apply climate models to improve understanding of climate change and make quantitative projections of future climate in Canada and globally. Its seasonal forecasting system provides climate forecasts over Canada on timescales of months to years.

== Past models ==
- CGCM3 The third generation coupled global climate model
- CGCM4 The fourth generation coupled global climate model
- CanESM2 The second generation Canadian Earth System Model

== Current models ==
- CanESM5 The Canadian Earth System Model version 5
- CanRCM The Canadian Regional Climate Model

== See also ==
- National Center for Atmospheric Research
- Earth Simulator
- HadCM3 – explanation of an AOGCM
- EdGCM – an educational version of a GCM
