= USS Atule =

Submarine of the United States

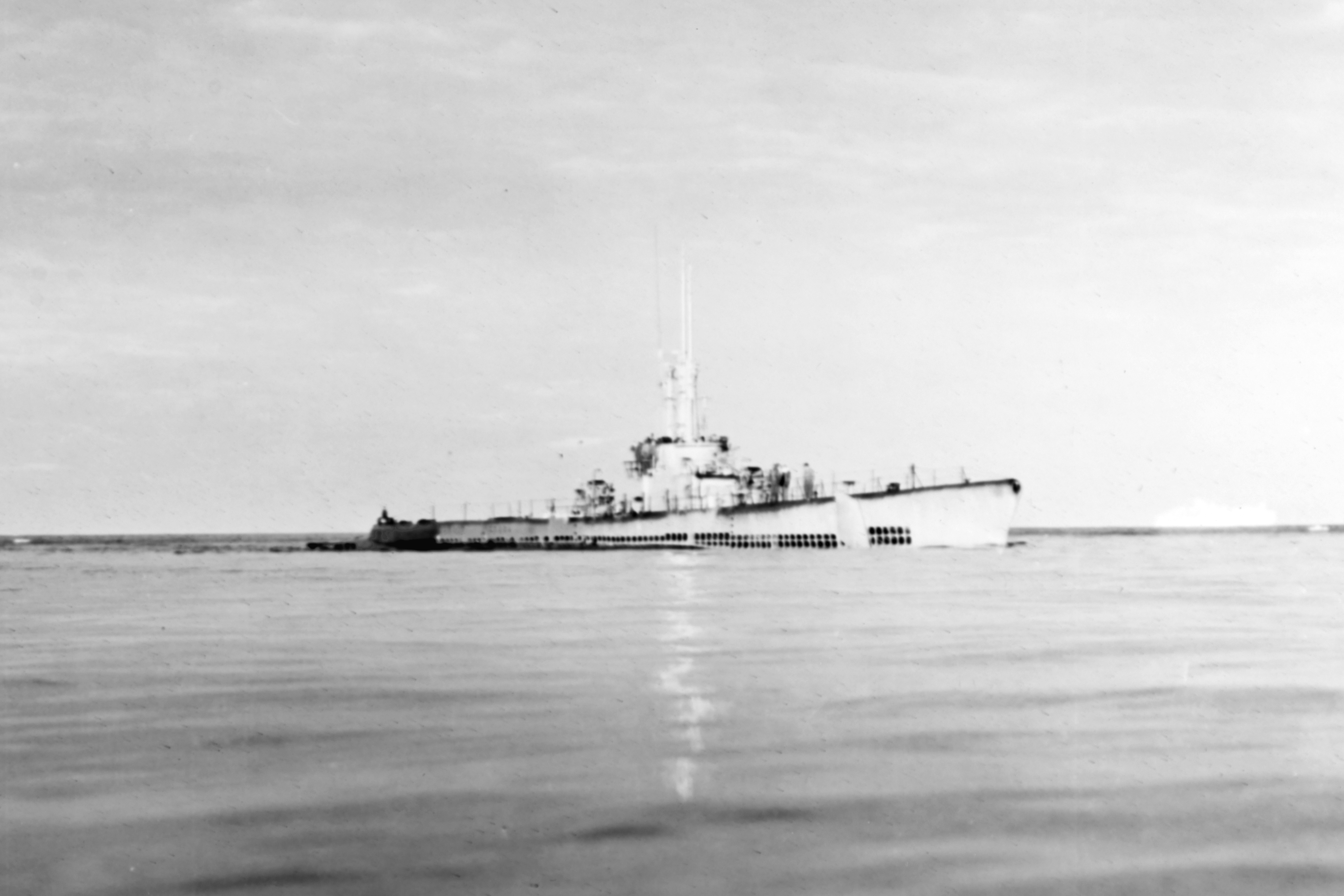
- Atule in the Kane Basin as part of Operation Nanook, an arctic-studies expedition

History

United States
- Name: USS Atule (SS-403)
- Builder: Portsmouth Naval Shipyard, Kittery, Maine
- Laid down: 2 December 1943
- Launched: 6 March 1944
- Commissioned: 21 June 1944
- Decommissioned: 8 September 1947
- Recommissioned: 8 March 1951
- Decommissioned: 6 April 1970
- Stricken: 15 August 1973
- Fate: Transferred to Peru on 31 July 1974

Peru
- Name: BAP Pacocha (SS-48)
- Acquired: 31 July 1974
- Fate: Rammed and sunk by a fishing trawler on 26 August 1988

General characteristics (World War II)
- Class & type: Balao-class diesel-electric submarine
- Displacement: 1,526 tons (1,550 t) surfaced, 2,391 tons (2,429 t) submerged
- Length: 311 ft (3,730 in)
- Beam: 27 ft 3 in (8.31 m)
- Draft: 16 ft 10 in (5.13 m) maximum
- Propulsion: 4 × Fairbanks-Morse Model 38D8-⅛ 10-cylinder opposed piston diesel engines driving electrical generators; 2 × 126-cell Sargo batteries; 4 × high-speed Elliott electric motors with reduction gears; two propellers; 5,400 shp (4.0 MW) surfaced; 2,740 shp (2.0 MW) submerged
- Speed: 20.25 kn (37.50 km/h) surfaced, 8.75 kn (16.21 km/h) submerged
- Range: 11,000 nmi (20,000 km) at 10 kn (19 km/h) surfaced
- Endurance: 48 hours at 2 kn (3.7 km/h) submerged, 75 days on patrol
- Test depth: 400 ft (120 m)
- Complement: 10 officers, 70–71 enlisted
- Armament: 10 × 21-inch (533 mm) torpedo tubes; 6 forward, 4 aft; 24 torpedoes; 1 × 5-inch (127 mm) / 25 caliber deck gun; Bofors 40 mm and Oerlikon 20 mm cannon

General characteristics (Guppy IA)
- Class & type: none
- Displacement: 1,830 tons (1,859 t) surfaced, 2,440 tons (2,479 t) submerged
- Length: 307 ft 7 in (93.75 m)
- Beam: 27 ft 4 in (8.33 m)
- Draft: 17 ft (5.2 m)
- Propulsion: Submarine snorkel added, Batteries upgraded to Sargo standard II
- Speed: Surfaced: 17.3 kn (32.0 km/h) (maximum); 12.5 kn (23.2 km/h) (cruising); Submerged: 15 kn (28 km/h) (for ½ hour); 7.5 kn (13.9 km/h) (snorkeling); 3 kn (5.6 km/h) cruising
- Range: 17,000 nmi (31,000 km) @ 11 kn (20 km/h) surfaced
- Endurance: 36 hours @ 3 kn (5.6 km/h) submerged
- Complement: 10 officers, 5 petty officers, 64–69 enlisted men
- Armament: 10 × 21 inch (533 mm) torpedo tubes (six forward, four aft), all guns removed

USS Atule (SS/AGSS-403), a Balao-class submarine, was the only ship of the United States Navy to be named for the atule.

== Construction and commissioning ==
Atule′s keel was laid down on 25 November 1943 by the Portsmouth Naval Shipyard in Kittery, Maine. Atule was launched on 6 March 1944 sponsored by Miss Elizabeth Louise Kauffman, the daughter of Rear Admiral James L. Kauffman, and commissioned on 21 June 1944.

== Service history ==
=== United States Navy ===
==== World War II ====
Following a month of shakedown training along the east coast, the submarine departed New London, Connecticut, and headed south to join the action in the Pacific. During a 15-day stopover at the Fleet Sound School in Key West, Florida, she sharpened her diving skills and fighting techniques. After transiting the Panama Canal, Atule steamed to Pearl Harbor with Jallao, training intensively en route to reach a peak of combat readiness. Upon her arrival at Pearl Harbor, Atule underwent voyage repairs and torpedo training into October.

On 9 October, Atule departed Pearl Harbor on her first war patrol in company with Pintado and Jallao. Under the command of Commander Bernard Clarey in Pintado, the three boats formed a wolf pack known as "Clarey's Crushers". Atule trained with Jallao and Pintado as they traveled westward. On 11 October, Atule picked up two radar contacts, tracked them, and maneuvered around them before identifying the contacts as Plaice and Thresher. The pack arrived at Tanapag Harbor, Saipan, on 21 October, refueled, made minor repairs, and departed early the next day. On 25 October, the wolf pack made its first score when Jallao hit light cruiser Tama and sent her to the bottom. That Japanese warship already had been damaged in the Battle off Cape Engaño and was part of the broken Japanese carrier-centered fleet retiring to the north. The wolf pack then spent two more days vainly searching for enemy vessels crippled during the Battle of Leyte Gulf. The boats then set course for their patrol sectors in Luzon Strait and the South China Sea.

Over the next few days, Atule made but lost several ship contacts. Shortly after midnight on 1 November, she established surface radar contact on a fast-moving escorted transport and moved in for the kill. Despite rain squalls and heavy seas, Atule was able to close the transport and fire six torpedoes. The first hit caused a terrific explosion which threw flaming material high in the air. When one of the transport's escorts began to close the submarine, she began a crash dive but still managed to hear a second explosion as she submerged. Nine depth charges exploded in the vicinity, but none was close enough to damage Atule. The crew in the submarine heard loud breaking up noises and upon surfacing, found a large oil slick and much debris. Atule was later credited with sinking the Asama Maru.

Atule continued her patrol, covering the Hong Kong-Manila traffic lane in the South China Sea and occasionally breaking off to investigate a contact report or to take special scouting dispositions by order of the pack commander. On 3 November, Jallao reported a five-ship force heading south, and the wolf pack moved to intercept. The contacts were moving at 20 kn (37 km/h), and Atule was never able to come within range for attack. However Pintado had better luck. That submarine's target was thought to be a large escorted oiler (actually the aircraft carrier Jun'yō), but before her torpedoes could strike the oiler Akikaze crossed their path and disintegrated in a tremendous explosion which was seen and heard on board Atule. The smoke screen provided by the ensuing fires protected the target, and Pintado was forced to withdraw.

During the next ten days, the wolf pack occasionally sighted ships or aircraft, but was unable to attack. On 13 November, Jallao reported an enemy ship. Pintado and Atule altered course to intercept the contact, and at 0850, Atule sighted what appeared to be the foretop of a battleship. At 1000, the enemy contact was established as an aircraft carrier, a heavy cruiser, and one destroyer. Atule maneuvered to approach the force as closely as possible, hoping that the enemy ships would initiate a "zig-zag" course which would bring them within range of her torpedoes. The Japanese force indeed did begin to "zig-zag", but, instead of making them vulnerable, the maneuver took the force out of range. At 1115, contact was lost.

Later that day and throughout the next, the submarine played a game of hide and seek with Japanese planes equipped with radar and magnetic detection devices. During this hunt, the Japanese covered all of the wolf pack's radio frequencies and intruded in Japanese as well as English, asking the Americans to "come in, please" in their best imitations of American aviators. Atule was forced to dive, zigzag, and run to evade these planes which dropped 14 depth charges. None came close to Atule, but Halibut was severely damaged. After a circuitous route to avoid Japanese planes, Atule began patrolling her assigned scouting station west of Formosa.

There, until after midnight on 20 November, she made only aircraft contacts. The submarine then sighted a slow moving surface vessel and moved in to attack. The night was dark, and the sky, clear. The enemy, identified later as Minesweeper Number 88, was protected by a squall during the early phase of Atule's approach, but was perfectly silhouetted against a clear horizon when the submarine fired four torpedoes. The third torpedo hit at the forward stack with a terrific explosion. The target was down by the bow, and, less than three minutes after the hit its stern reared up as the ship slid under, depth charges exploding as she went down.

On 24 November, Atule sighted by periscope one transport with three escorts heading northeast toward Sabtang Island. The submarine surfaced at dark and set course to intercept the transport shortly after midnight. As she set her sights on the target, one of the escorts also moved into view. Atule fired six bow tubes and two stern tubes at the overlapping targets, scoring two hits on each. The escort, later identified as Patrol Boat Number 88, was claimed destroyed but survived the attack; and the transport, a 7,266-ton cargo ship named Santos Maru, went dead in the water. Atule moved out of range of the other two escorts which were wildly searching the area. The transport disappeared from view and from radar and the submarine returned to patrol.

On 27 November, a radar contact and subsequent visual sighting of a ship at anchor between Dequey Island and Ibuhos Island gave Atule another chance for action. Approaching from the north of Dequey Island, Atule closed the transport to 2,000 yd (1,800 m) and fired four torpedoes. The four hits spread the length of the ship; and, in the ensuing fire, the port side was seen to be blown almost completely away. The ship was racked by violent oil and ammunition explosions, and the flames were visible 15 miles away. One hour and eight minutes after the first hit, the ship blew apart. However, Atule was never officially credited with this sinking, because a postwar study of Japanese records did not substantiate the loss.

On 28 November, the submarine left her patrol station and headed for Majuro Atoll for refit alongside Bushnell. Arriving on 11 December, Atule ended a highly productive first patrol in which she accounted for almost 27,000 tons of enemy shipping destroyed.

Atule spent December in upkeep and training, including a six-day coordinated convoy exercise with Spadefish, Pompon, and Jallao. On 6 January 1945, she departed Majuro in company with these same ships, Commander Gordon W. Underwood in Spadefish as group commander. En route to Saipan, "Underwood's Urchins" conducted training dives, emergency drills, and radar tracking exercises.

After a brief stop in Tanapag Harbor alongside Fulton, Atule headed for her patrol area in the Yellow Sea. Since Pompon and Jallao were delayed she sailed in company with Spadefish, Bang, and Devilfish. Prior to her arrival in the patrol area, Atule took part in a fruitless search for downed aviators. Reports of sightings of the survivors were not in agreement, and the approximate location could not be determined. The search was abandoned on 17 January. Pompon joined the pack on 20 January, and, the next day, they entered the Yellow Sea.

While on patrol, Atule sighted many sampans and fishing boats, but could not strike a blow at the Japanese fleet until 24 January. On that afternoon, she commenced tracking a merchant ship. At periscope depth, the target was lost in a snow squall, so Atule came to radar depth to regain contact, closed for a stern shot, and fired four torpedoes. Two hit their marks, one abreast the stack, the second near the aftermast. The ship settled rapidly by the stern. The crew hastily abandoned the ship in time to see the stern break off and disappear. The forward section of the ship bobbed like a cork, so Atule surfaced to finish off the freighter with gunfire. The freighter returned fire, and the submarine fired another torpedo which missed the target. Atule retired to await nightfall, when she again failed to sink the hulk with gunfire. She loosed another torpedo, which hit amidships, and the freighter began settling by the bow. Atule left the empty hulk in a vertical position with the midship section high in the air. After the war her victim was identified as Taiman Maru Number 1.

Atule was assigned to patrol in the northern part of the Yellow Sea. The seas were heavy, and the snow and wind combined to create blizzard conditions. After four days, she shifted to the southwest corner of the sea between Korea and China. On 27 January, Pompon reported a convoy contact and, together with Spadefish, attacked. Atule was too distant to join in, but heard several explosions. Early the next day, she gained contact on a medium transport trying to escape the area of the attack of the previous day, and she gave chase until shoal water and the presence of an enemy escort forced her to veer off.

Floating naval mines became Atule's new targets. During the rest of her patrol, she sighted 29 mines, 23 of which she sank by gunfire, and one which bounced harmlessly down the submarine's side. Atule patrolled the Chinese and Korean coastlines and traffic lanes until 22 February, when she headed for Saipan where she once again moored alongside Fulton. On 28 February she left Tanapag Harbor bound for Midway Island, where she moored on 7 March.

After refit alongside Pelias, Atule conducted extensive drills in multiple fire torpedo attacks, gunfire, sound training and evasion exercises. On 2 April, she departed Midway, bound for Guam. After one day alongside Holland in Apra Harbor, the submarine departed on 12 April for her patrol area off Bungo Suido. Gato covered the east entrance and Atule the west. The patrol consisted almost entirely of lifeguard duty and mine destruction. On 4 May, she sighted an enemy submarine but it escaped before Atule could close for attack. On 5 May, Atule and a B-29 Superfortress "Dumbo" plane—which carried an airborne lifeboat for air-sea rescue operations—conducted a coordinated attack on two Japanese planes. Atule acted as "fighter" director and vectored the Superfortress to the Japanese planes. She then submerged and watched as one plane fled and one was shot down in a very unusual dogfight. Atule rescued one badly burned Japanese flier from the wreckage. The war patrol ended on 30 May when Atule arrived at Pearl Harbor for a three-week refit by Euryale.

After a week of drills, Atule departed Pearl Harbor on 3 July bound for a lifeguard station in the Nanpō Islands. After nine days with little action, the submarine proceeded to her patrol area in Empire waters east of Honshū as part of an attack group which also included Gato and Archer-Fish. On 12 August, Atule gained contact on two ships, later identified as Coast Defense Vessel Number 6 and Coast Defense Vessel Number 16, steaming along the coast. Shallow waters and poor visibility caused Atule to set a course to intercept in the vicinity of Urakawa Ko rather than to attack the contacts under such adverse conditions. With the targets overlapping, Atule fired six torpedoes. The closer of the two ships – Coast Defense Vessel Number 6 – exploded with an orange flame and much flying debris. The second target disappeared from radar, but it is not known whether she sank or escaped. On 15 August, Atule heard the news of the Japanese capitulation and headed for Pearl Harbor, where she arrived on 25 August. On 30 August, she departed Pearl Harbor via the Panama Canal, bound for New London, Connecticut.

While in New London, Atule was assigned to Submarine Squadron 2 (SubRon 2) and engaged in training operations for the Submarine School and the Prospective Commanding Officer's School located there. Following Navy Day ceremonies in Washington, D.C., she proceeded to the Portsmouth Naval Shipyard in Maine for an overhaul which was completed on 3 February 1946.

==== Post-War ====
On 4 July 1946, Atule headed for the frozen north as a member of Operation Nanook. The purpose of this mission was to assist in the establishment of advanced weather stations in the Arctic regions and to aid in the planning and execution of more extensive naval operations in polar and sub-polar regions. In company with Norton Sound, Whitewood, Alcona, Beltrami, and Northwind, Atule was to transport supplies and passengers, conduct reconnaissance of proposed weather station sites, train personnel, and collect data on Arctic conditions.

Atule rendezvoused with Northwind and Whitewood off the southwestern coast of Greenland on 11 July 1946 and put into Melville Bight, Baffin Bay, on 20 July, while a PBY Catalina reconnoitered Thule Harbor and the approaches to the harbor. Following engine trouble, the Catalina made an emergency landing, and Atule was dispatched to recover the plane, becoming the first ship of the operation to enter the harbor. Atule then conducted tests and exercises in Smith South-Kane Basin with Whitewood. During one such exercise, she reached latitude 79 degrees 11 minutes north in the Kane Basin, at the time a record for the United States Navy. Atule had been equipped with the first upward-beamed fathometer for measuring ice thickness overhead. On 29 July, Atule departed Thule, having completed all of her scheduled projects, stopped at Halifax, Nova Scotia and reached New London late in August to resume her former duties.

On 27 February 1947, Atule arrived at Philadelphia, Pennsylvania, for overhaul and inactivation. On 8 September 1947, she was placed out of commission, in reserve, with the New London Group of the Atlantic Reserve Fleet. After three years in "mothballs," Atule was towed to the Portsmouth Naval Shipyard in Kittery, Maine, for reactivation and conversion to a GUPPY IA type submarine. Outfitted with a snorkel to permit use of her engines while submerged and a smooth streamlined superstructure for added speed, Atule rejoined the fleet a stronger, more versatile warship. On 8 March 1951, the submarine was recommissioned.

Assigned to SubRon 8 in New London, Atule conducted a shakedown cruise in the Caribbean Sea and then participated in Fleet and NATO training exercises in the Atlantic and the Caribbean. On 9 February 1952, she departed New London for a tour of duty in the Mediterranean and participation in NATO Exercise Grand Slam. During the deployment, she visited Gibraltar, Malta, and Marseille, before arriving back in the United States on 29 March.

After several months of extensive training and preparations Atule participated in LANTSUBEX I from 15 September-11 October. During this operation, she found herself battling the high seas and 100 kn (190 km/h) winds of Hurricane Charlie which at one point rolled her more than 60 degrees to port, washing the officer of the deck and the lookout off the bridge. With safety belts attaching them to the bridge, they were able to climb safely back on board.

On 19 November, Atule entered the Portsmouth Naval Shipyard for an overhaul. After the yard work had been completed she got underway on 4 April 1953 to resume normal operations. During LANTSUBEX II in October, she suffered a serious fire and lost propulsion for approximately six hours in very heavy seas. The submarine arrived in New London on 27 October for repairs, leave and upkeep. She recommenced operations late in January 1954, by sailing to Saint Thomas, United States Virgin Islands, for the annual Operation Springboard exercise. Late in February Atule departed St. Thomas for the return trip.

But for a two-week visit to the Fort Lauderdale, Florida, area to provide services to the Naval Ordnance Laboratory Test Facility, she remained in New London for five months. Upon her return to New London Atule operated in the local area until February 1955, when she entered the Philadelphia Naval Shipyard for an extensive overhaul which was completed in August. The submarine then resumed training and operations in the New London area. In July 1957, Atule cruised to the Mediterranean Sea and operated with the 6th Fleet until October. She entered the Philadelphia Naval Shipyard in January 1958 and departed in July, sailing to Key West, Florida, where she was assigned to SubRon 12.

During the fall of 1958, Atule became familiar with her new operating area by working with the Operational Development Force assisting in the development and evaluation of new submarine techniques and equipment. She also acted as a target in surface and air antisubmarine exercises. After a Christmas leave period, Atule conducted local operations until April 1959, when she participated in an Atlantic Fleet exercise and then resumed local drills.

In July 1960, Atule again cruised to the Mediterranean Sea for surface-subsurface training with NATO forces which lasted until October, when she returned to the United States and entered the Charleston Naval Shipyard for a six-month overhaul. After completion of the yard work in April 1961, Atule spent 18 months alternating duty at Key West, Florida, with service at Guantanamo Bay supporting training for the destroyer force in antisubmarine warfare.

In October 1963, the submarine entered the Norfolk Naval Shipyard for an overhaul which ended in February 1964. She returned to Key West, Florida, and operated from her home port until July when she sailed for the Mediterranean Sea to operate with the 6th Fleet. She returned to her home port in November for routine operations.

In August 1965, Atule departed Port of Spain, Trinidad, in company with other United States warships for a goodwill cruise during which she circumnavigated the South American continent. Known as Operation Unitas VI, this operation promoted cooperation between naval forces of the United States and the participating South American countries. Atule drilled with ships of the navies of Venezuela, Colombia, Ecuador, Peru, and Chile as she transited the Panama Canal and headed south along the coast. On 16 October, the submarine entered the Strait of Magellan and arrived at Punta Arenas, Chile, the southernmost city of South America. As she headed north, Atule's crew became ambassadors of good will in port calls to Puerto Belgrano, Mar del Plata, Rio de Janeiro, and San Salvador before disbanding the UNITAS VI task unit in Trinidad on 1 December. The submarine then sailed for home and arrived there on 6 December for a leave and upkeep period that lasted into 1966. She remained in nearby waters for training and routine operations until 5 July when she moved to Charleston, South Carolina, for another overhaul.

Atule left the shipyard on 26 January 1967 and during the year was assigned to duties at the Prospective Commanding Officers School and Fleet Training Group at Guantanamo Bay as well as continuing local training. In February 1968, she headed for the Gulf of Mexico and New Orleans, Louisiana, to train naval reservists and to celebrate Mardi Gras. The submarine returned via St. Petersburg, Florida, to her home port, where she continued general operations until 1 October when she got underway for her last Mediterranean Sea deployment. After almost four months of exercises with the 6th Fleet, Atule returned to the United States on 3 February 1969 and resumed her duties in the local area. On 29 August, Atule departed Key West for Philadelphia where she was placed in commission, in reserve, on 15 September. Redesignated with the hull classification symbol AGSS-403 on 1 October, Atule was decommissioned on 6 April 1970 and her name was struck from the Naval Vessel Register on 15 August 1973. She was sold to Peru in July 1974.

=== Peruvian Navy ===
Renamed BAP Pacocha (SS-48), the submarine served in the Marina de Guerra Peruana (the Peruvian Navy) until 26 August 1988, when she was rammed and sunk by a Japanese fishing trawler. The loss of Pacocha was instrumental in the beatification of Marija Petkovic, as one of the survivors (a Peruvian Navy lieutenant) said that he had been praying to her before he performed several impossible display of physical strength to save the lives of himself and several of his companions.

== Awards ==
- Asiatic-Pacific Campaign Medal with four battle stars for World War II service
- Navy Occupation Service Medal with "EUROPE" clasp
