= Whitewood =

Whitewood can be:

== Plants ==
- The wood of spruce trees.
- Bucida buceras, a Caribbean tree
- Coccoloba krugii, a species of seagrape
- Petrobium, an endemic tree from the island of St Helena
- Elaeocarpus kirtonii, an Australian rainforest tree
- Elaeocarpus obovatus, an Australian rainforest tree
- Liriodendron tulipifera, a large North American flowering tree
- Tabebuia heterophylla, a tree of Caribbean islands
- Triplochiton scleroxylon, a tree of West Africa and Central Africa

== Places ==
- Whitewood, Saskatchewan, Canada
- Whitewood, South Dakota, United States
- Whitewood, Virginia, United States
- Whitewood Creek, a stream in South Dakota
- Whitewood (electoral district), an electoral constituency in the Northwest Territories of Canada

== Ships ==
- Ships in the United States Navy:
  - USS Whitewood (AG-129)
  - USS Whitewood (AN-63)

== Other uses ==
- When a pinball machine is in the development phase the prototype playfield is called a "whitewood".
- Whitewoods, an American chillwave/vaporwave music duo
