= Sabtang Church =

Roman Catholic church in Batanes, Philippines

- Saint Vincent Ferrer Parish Church
- San Vicente Ferrer Parish Church
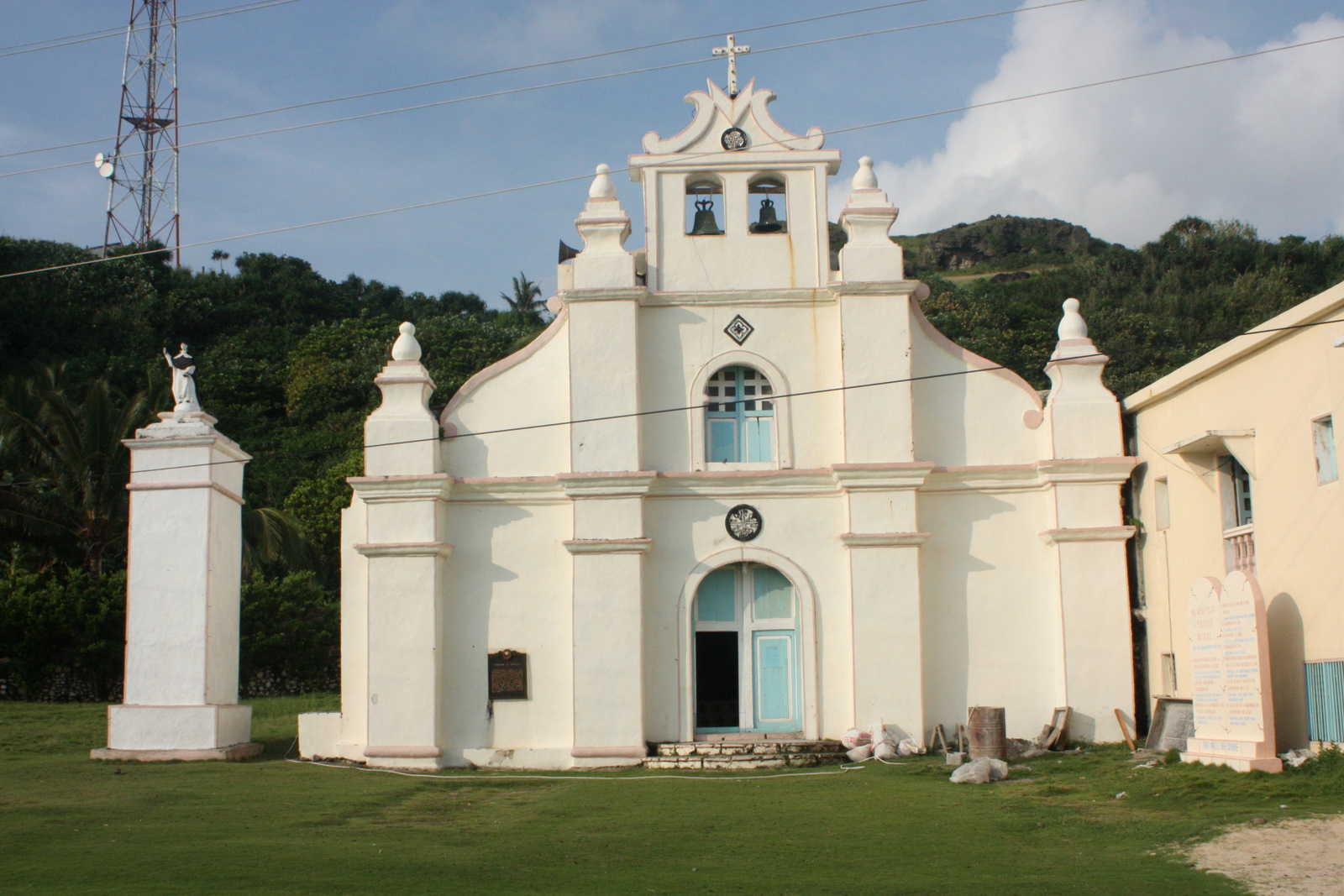
- Church facade in 2011

- Location in Batanes Location in Luzon Location in the Philippines
- 20°20′04″N 121°52′20″E
- Location: Sabtang, Batanes
- Country: Philippines
- Denomination: Roman Catholic

History
- Status: Parish church

Architecture
- Functional status: Active
- Architectural type: Church building
- Groundbreaking: 1844

Administration
- Archdiocese: Tuguegarao
- Diocese: Prelature of Batanes

Clergy
- Archbishop: Ricardo Baccay
- Bishop: Danilo Ulep

Saint Vincent Ferrer Parish Church, commonly known as Sabtang Church, is a Roman Catholic church located near Sabtang Port in Sabtang, Batanes, Philippines. It is under the jurisdiction of the Territorial Prelature of Batanes. Originally a small chapel in 1785 when the Sabtang mission first opened by the Dominicans, the church underwent few modifications until 1984. A short distance to the right of the church's façade stands a pedestal with a stone statue of Saint Vincent Ferrer, the patron saint of the parish and of the municipality.

The church and site of the convent was declared a National Historical Landmark by the National Historical Commission of the Philippines in 2008.

== History ==
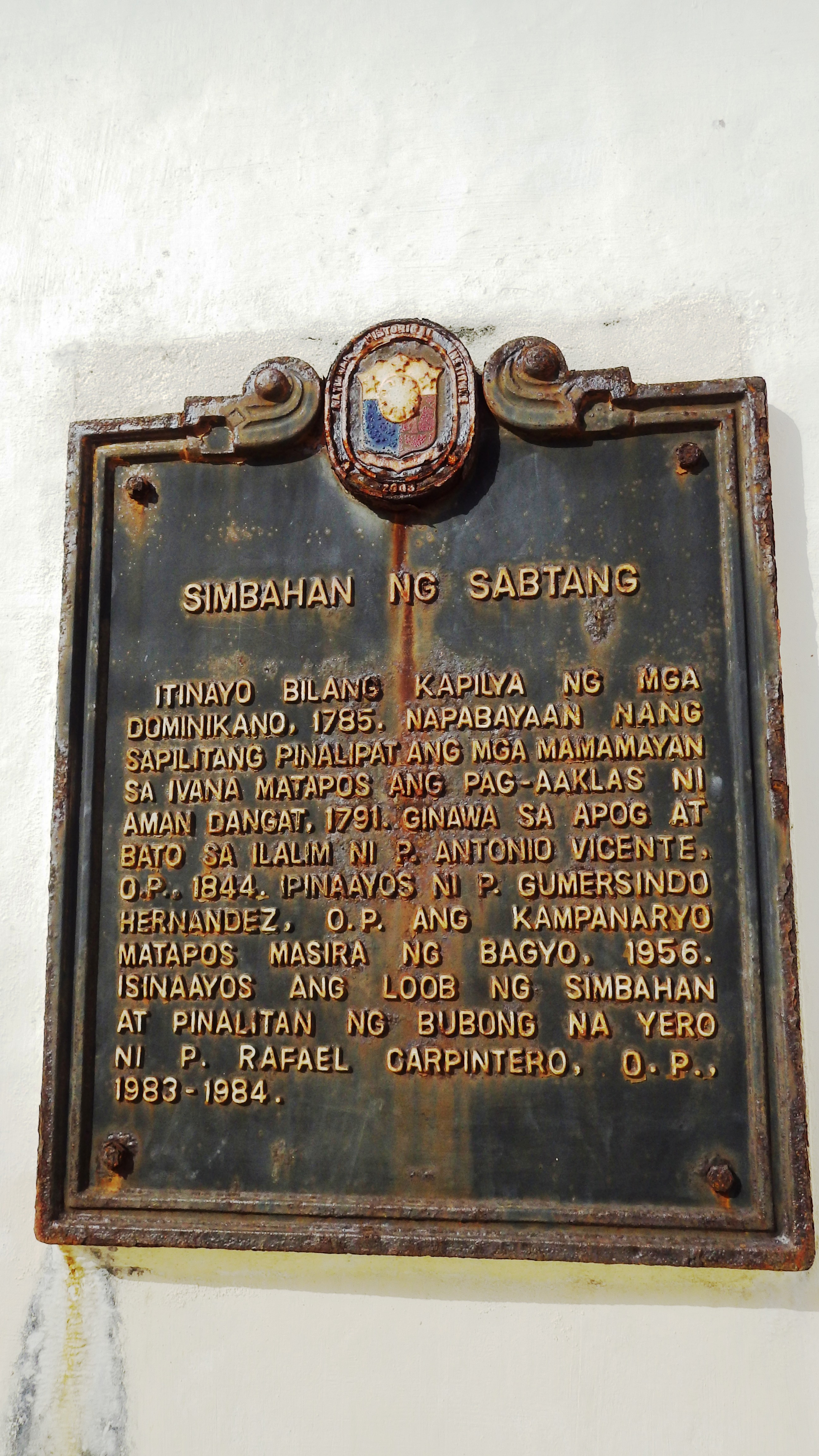
Church NHI historical marker

Sabtang was recognized as a mission vicariate in 1844, more than a century after the forced evacuation of the Isabtangs following the execution of the local datu Aman Dangat of Malacdang for alleged murder of the Cagayano agents sent by the Spaniards to the island in 1791 to procure supplies. When the Isabtangs transferred to Ivana, the church was left neglected.

Father Antonio Vicente became the first vicar of the resettlement when Sabtang was re-established in 1844 and he began the construction of a church made of lime and stone together with the attached convent in that same year. Between 1869 and 1876, many constructions took place not only in the church but also in its immediate surroundings. Under Father Rafael Cano, the side altar of Our Lady of the Rosary was created, a guest room was added inside the convent, a school house for children was constructed, and a seawall fronting the seaport was made. In October 1956, the belfry, described as “curvaceous” and “original”, was blown down by a hurricane. A new one was later put in place under Fr. Gumersindo Hernandez in that same year. In 1983 to 1984, the cogon roofing of the church was replaced by galvanized iron sheets by Father Rafael Carpintero, OP. The same roofing modification was applied to the convent the following year. The following year, red brick tiles forming the flooring of the sanctuary was replaced by cement.

== Architectural features ==
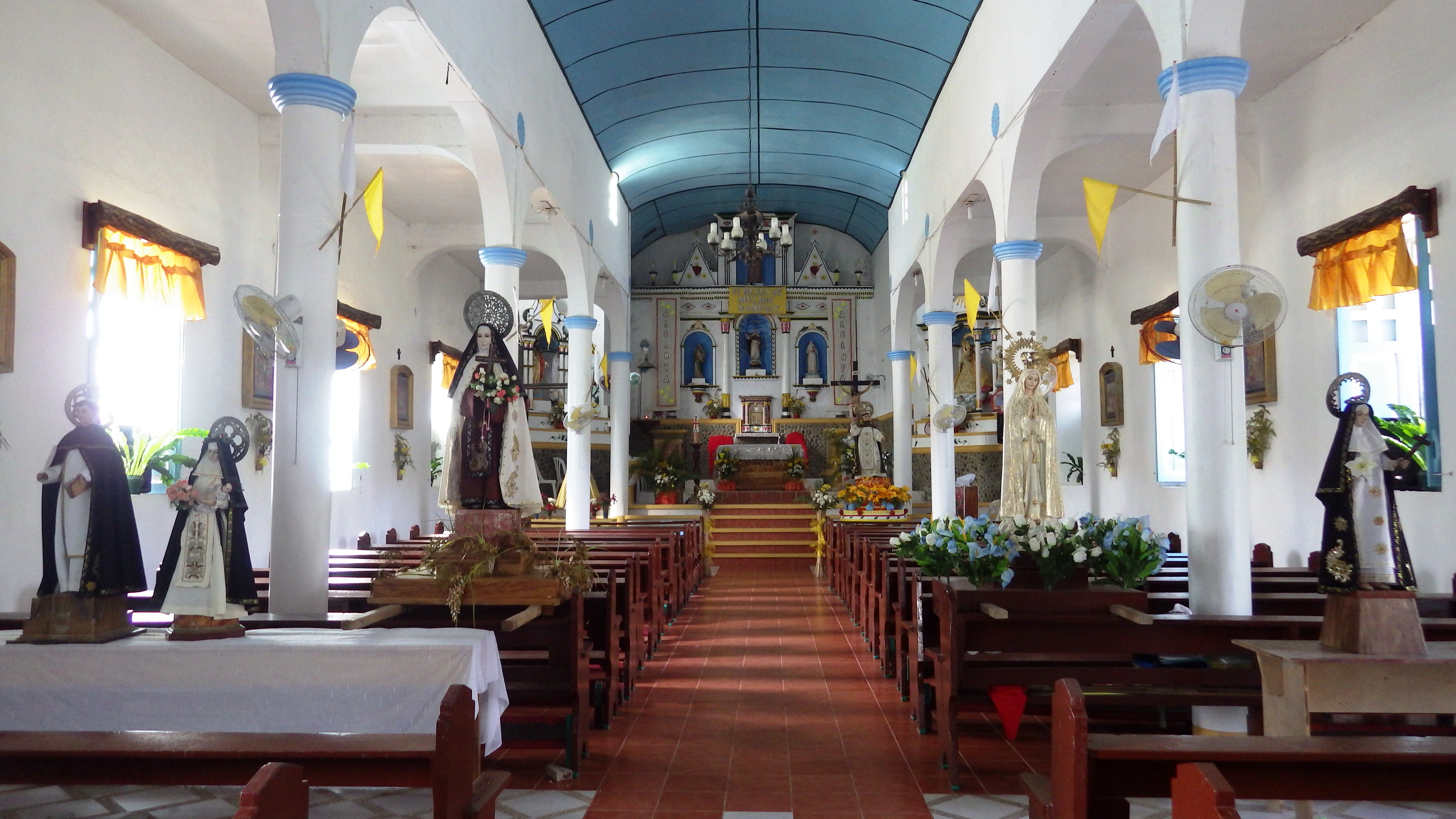
Church interior in 2014

Like other old churches in Batanes, Sabtang Church was modeled after Basco Church both on its floor plan and façade. The church bell crowns the top of the church, in espadaña style. It has four massive and broad pilasters and heavy set finials, with the façade projecting a heaviness of appearance. Thick walls made of stone and lime enclose the nave, with buttresses on the outside. At the back of the façade are four round pillars supporting the choir loft. Below the choir loft is the baptistery.

The original baroque retablo was made of polychrome and gilded woodwork. It is located above the high altar and in place are niches for statues of saints. It underwent renovations under Father Carpintero in 1983 and 1984, with the deteriorated originals replaced by close copies.
