= Operation Nanook (1946) =

Arctic expedition by the US Navy in 1946

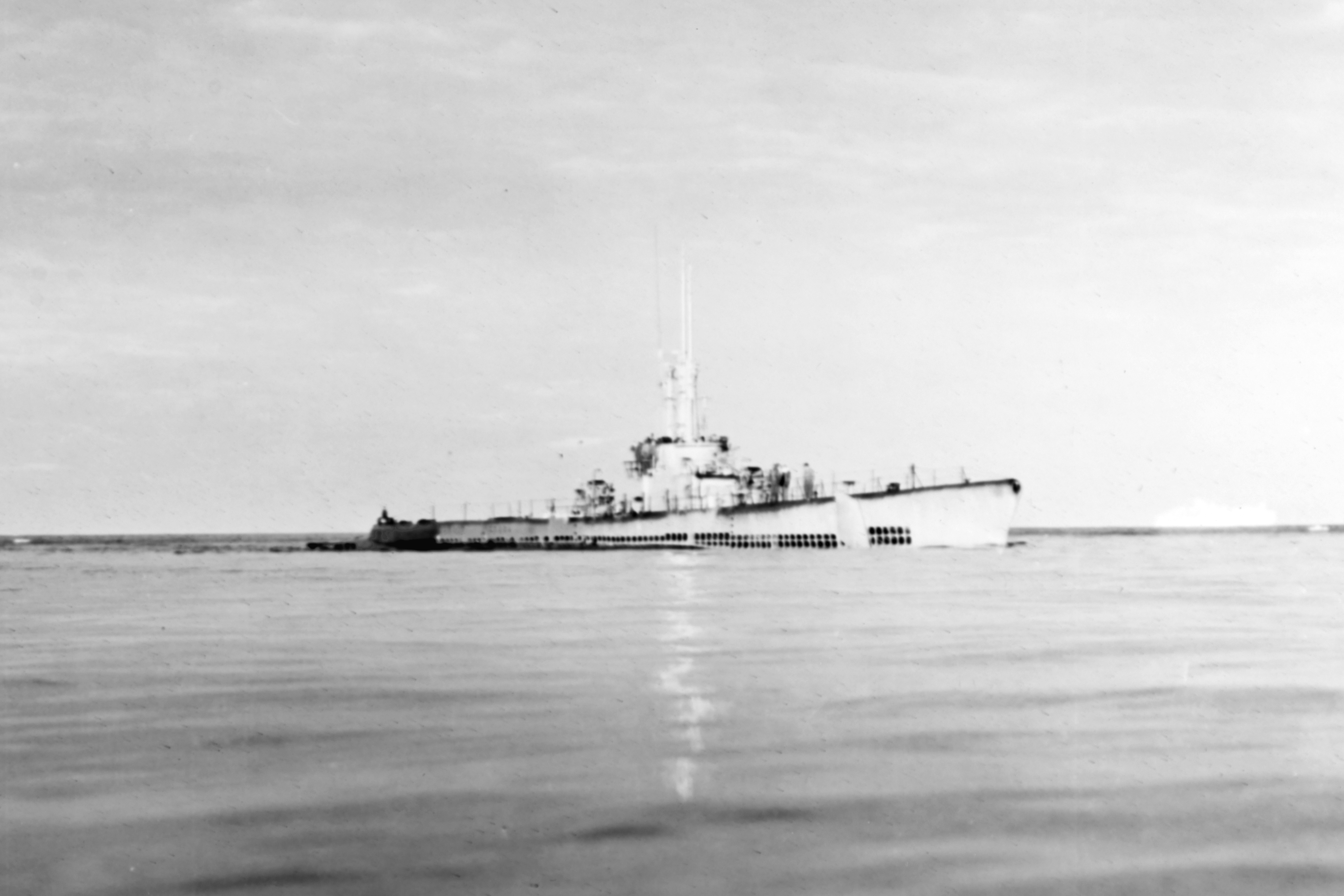
USS Atule during Operation Nanook (1946).

Operation Nanook was an Arctic expedition undertaken by the United States Navy in 1946. It consisted of USS Norton Sound (AV-11), USS Atule (SS-403), USCGC Northwind (WAG-282), USS Alcona (AK-157), USS Beltrami (AK-162), and USS Whitewood (AN-63). The mission is mostly documented as cartographic in nature.

From 22 July to 5 August 1946, all activities in Operation Nanook centered on Thule; Norton Sound remained at anchor there, in North Star Bay, servicing her two PBM's. Meanwhile, Whitewood and Atule operated from North Star Bay as they conducted exercises and tests in the Smith Sound-Kane Basin area. On 5 August 1946, Norton Sound and Whitewood headed for Dundas Harbour, Nunavut and Devon Island, in order to attempt air and surface operations there. Unfortunately, the ships found the harbor iced over, with a belt of pack ice extending out three miles down the coast. The Northwind broke ice in support of Operation Nanook.

== The mission ==
The mission was to erect a radio and weather station in Thule. It was built from wooden barracks on the Pituffik, a Greenlandish word for "the place where we tie the dogs", in a large glacier valley about two miles from the trade station North Star Bay, which the Polar explorer Knud Rasmussen built.

The station was to be operated as joint Danish/American operation, under the Danish colours and Danish supervision by a crew of twenty men, ten from each nation.

Regular weather observations were maintained as Synopsies, Pibal and Radiosonde.

The station was kept in operation until 1951 when Thule Air Base was built in the valley; the weather station was then moved to the Greenlandish settlement at North Star Bay, and renamed "Dundas", until the population was moved to Qaanaaq further north in 1953.
