= Aman Dangat =

Filipino chieftain and revolt leader

Datu Aman Dangat
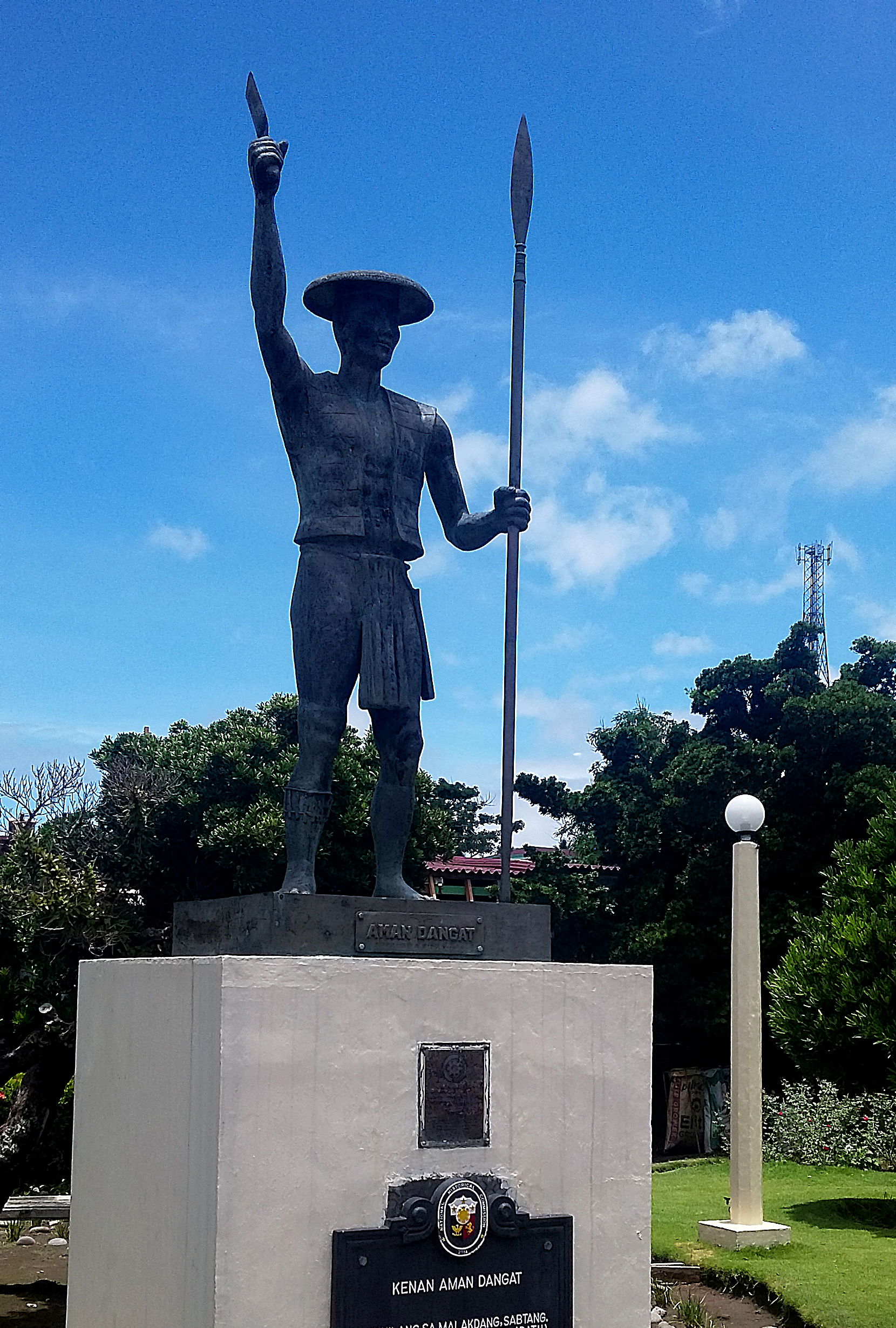
- Born: Sabtang Island, Batanes
- Died: September 1791; Basco, Batanes
- Cause of death: Executed by hanging
- Other names: Kenan, Buenaventura
- Occupation: Chieftain of Malakdang
- Known for: Ivatan Uprising/Dangat Revolt (1785-1791)

Aman Dangat, also known as "Kenan", was a prominent Mangpus from the town of Malakdang in Sabtang Island in Batanes, Philippines. He led a revolt against the Spaniards from 1785 to 1791.

== Revolt against Spain ==
=== Founding of the province ===
In 1782, Governor-General José Basco y Vargas sent an expedition to Batanes Island, formally subjecting the Ivatan people to the authority of the Spanish King. Spanish authority was established on June 26, 1783 in the Batanes islands, with Joseph Huelva y Melgarejo being appointed as the first governor. The new province was named Provincia de la Concepcion. Despite this, Aman Dangat continued to govern his people according to their indigenous and customary laws.

=== Resistance to policies ===
To facilitate colonial administration, the villagers of Sabtang and Vuhus were relocated to San Vicente and San Felix in the town of Ivana in 1785. It was during this year that Aman Dangat first got into trouble with the Spanish authorities as he asked why he should follow Spanish policies. He defied the Spanish policies and initially it was a show of force as he probed the weaknesses and strength of the Spanish authorities. In 1789, the third governor of Batanes Joaquin del Castillo decreed that the Ivatans should live in the newly laid towns, change their attire and customs, and adopt the Spanish government system. The natives were to obey the law by means of obedience to the governor as the king's representative.

He was offended by the decree as he was the chieftain of Malakdang. As a result, he and about 150 men surrounded the mission house of Dominican priest Father Bartolome Artiguez and demanded to know if the governor had a plan to arrest him. The priest assured him that there was no such plan. Aman Dangat also asked Governor del Castillo the same question, and the governor assured him that there was no such plan, telling him that he should not hesitate to appeal to the governor if he felt unfairly treated in any way.

=== Uprising and death ===
In 1791, non-Ivatan Filipinos employed by the Spanish government seized supplies and timber from Aman Dangat's people without compensation. When he protested to the governor, his men were chained. Under his leadership, he organized an uprising. Over a hundred men from Sabtang joined him in a revolt and seven government agents were killed. The Spanish authorities then overpowered Aman Dangat's force as the latter was outnumbered by the stronger Spanish forces. Most of his men were killed or captured.

Aman Dangat, a powerful chieftain and a leader fighting for the rights and freedom of the natives, was hanged in public in September 1791 in the town of Basco, Batanes. Before his execution, he was baptized and was named Buenaventura.

Following his death, the people of Sabtang were ordered to settle in San Vicente and San Felix in the town of Ivana in Batan Island.

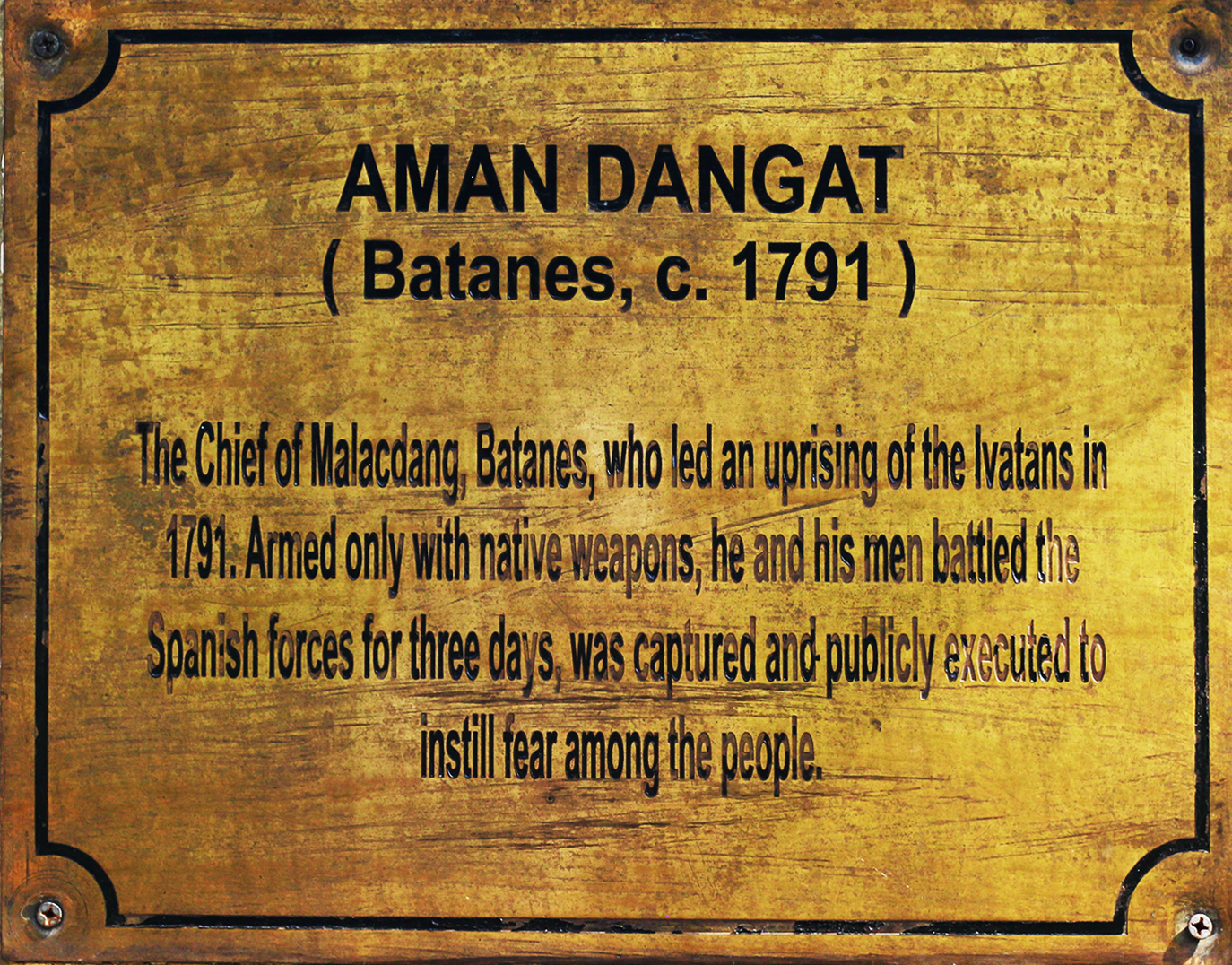
AMAN DANGAT
