= USS Alcona =

United States Navy cargo ship

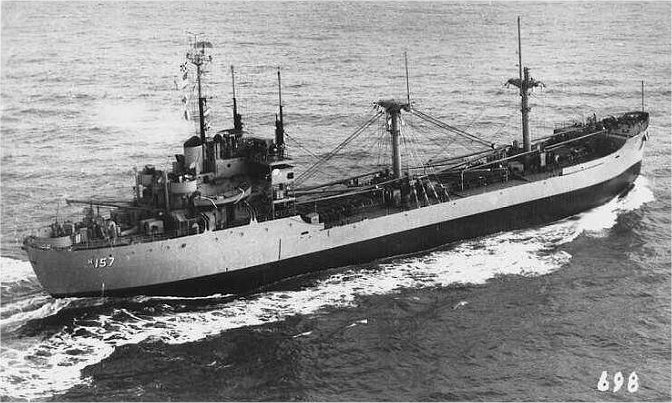
- A post-war image of USS Alcona (AK-157) underway, date and location unknown. Her armament has been removed

History

United States
- Name: Alcona
- Namesake: Alcona County, Michigan
- Ordered: as type (C1-M-AV1) hull, MC hull 2102
- Builder: Kaiser Shipbuilding Co., Richmond, California
- Yard number: 59
- Laid down: 27 November 1943
- Launched: 9 May 1944
- Sponsored by: Mrs. Morris Chamberlain
- Acquired: 15 September 1944
- Commissioned: 15 September 1944
- Decommissioned: 5 May 1955
- Stricken: 1 April 1960
- Identification: Hull symbol: AK-157; Code letters: NEFH
- Fate: sold for scrapping, 28 July 1960; dismantling completed, 31 October 1961

General characteristics
- Class & type: Alamosa-class cargo ship
- Type: C1-M-AV1
- Tonnage: 5,032 long tons deadweight (DWT)
- Displacement: 2,382 long tons (2,420 t) (standard); 7,450 long tons (7,570 t) (full load)
- Length: 388 ft 8 in (118.47 m)
- Beam: 50 ft (15 m)
- Draft: 21 ft 1 in (6.43 m)
- Installed power: 1 × Nordberg, TSM 6 diesel engine; 1,750 shp (1,300 kW)
- Propulsion: 1 × propeller
- Speed: 11.5 kn (21.3 km/h; 13.2 mph)
- Capacity: 3,945 t (3,883 long tons) DWT; 9,830 cu ft (278 m^{3}) (refrigerated); 227,730 cu ft (6,449 m^{3}) (non-refrigerated)
- Complement: 15 Officers; 70 Enlisted
- Armament: 1 × 3 in (76 mm)/50 caliber dual purpose gun (DP); 6 × 20 mm (0.8 in) Oerlikon anti-aircraft (AA) cannons

USS Alcona (AK-157) was an Alamosa-class cargo ship commissioned by the U.S. Navy for service in World War II. She was responsible for delivering troops, goods and equipment to locations in the war zone.

== Construction ==
Alcona was laid down as the unnamed Maritime Commission contract hull, MC hull 2102, on 27 November 1943, at Richmond, California, by the Kaiser Shipbuilding Co.; named Alcona by the Navy and designated AK-157 on 25 February 1944; launched on 9 May 1944 and sponsored by Mrs. Morris Chamberlain of Oakland, California, transferred there by the Maritime Commission to the Navy on 15 September 1944, and commissioned the same day. Alcona then shifted to the Mare Island Navy Yard, Vallejo, California, to be fitted out.

== Service history ==
=== World War II Pacific Theatre operations ===
Following shakedown training out of San Pedro, California, Alcona reported by dispatch, for duty with Service Squadron 7 on 22 October 1944 the same day that she sailed for San Francisco, California. Arriving there on the 23d, Alcona took on board cargo and got underway on the last day of October to commence operations supplying American advanced bases in New Guinea and later, in the Philippines which would keep her occupied for the rest of the war. Pausing briefly at Pearl Harbor on 10 and 11 November, Alcona then continued, via Finschhafen, New Guinea, to Manus where she arrived on 29 November. After discharging her cargo, Alcona then proceeded via Hollandia, New Guinea, to Mios Woendi, in the Padaido Islands, where she spent Christmas before getting underway on 27 December for Australia.

Alcona reached Brisbane, Australia, on 4 January 1945 and loaded cargo there until the 10th when she weighed anchor to head for the advanced base at Milne Bay, New Guinea. Upon emptying her hold there and at Finschhafen, the cargo ship then proceeded to Torokina, Bougainville, in the Solomons to pick up a mine unit for transportation to the Philippines. Arriving at Cape Torokina on 27 January, the ship got underway, via Hollandia, for Leyte the following morning and arrived at San Pedro Bay, Leyte, on 12 February. Underway for Manus on the 24th Alcona arrived in the Admiralties on 3 March and loaded cargo there before getting underway for Brisbane on the 11th. Although a typhoon hindered the ship's passage, she reached her destination without mishap on the 18th. Subsequently, Alcona returned to the Philippines and entered Manila Bay on 24 April. En route back, she touched at Seeadler Harbor, Manus, and Humboldt Bay, New Guinea, before reaching Hollandia to reload. Upon arrival back in the Philippines, Alcona discharged her cargo into tank landing craft (LCT's) off the former American naval base at Cavite. After discharging more cargo at Subic Bay on 17 May, at Guiuan Samar, the same day, and at San Pedro Bay, Alcona visited Brisbane for the third time in mid-June.

Alcona had transported another consignment of cargo to the Philippines by mid-July and had completed her task at Subic Bay by 8 August, two days after the first atomic bomb had been dropped on the city of Hiroshima. Underway for Samar on the 12th, Alcona arrived three days later and was lying at anchor off Samar the day that Japan capitulated, 15 August 1945.

=== Post-war operations ===
Alcona conducted another voyage from Brisbane to the Philippines and then, after undergoing repairs in the advanced base sectional floating drydock ABSD-5, proceeded to Samar on 12 November. Alcona remained there until she sailed for Panama on 19 January 1946. Reaching Balboa on 3 March, Alcona entered the Panama Canal that afternoon and reached Cristobal on the Atlantic side of the isthmus, at 23:40. Underway for Norfolk, Virginia, on the morning of 7 March, Alcona proceeded toward her destination until rerouted to New York on the 12th. She anchored in Gravesend Bay, New York, on the 16th but got underway for Bayonne, New Jersey, 10 days later. The cargo ship reached the wharf at the naval base annex there that afternoon. After discharging cargo brought from the Pacific and loading new cargo, Alcona got underway for Norfolk on the morning of 13 April and anchored in Hampton Roads the following morning. Underway at 14:05 on the 19th, the ship reached Pier 4, Berth 42, Naval Operating Base (NOB), Norfolk, Virginia, at 14:45 to discharge cargo. Securing from alI cargo operations on the afternoon of the 24th, she steamed out into Hampton Roads and anchored until the morning of 1 May, when she got underway for Boston, Massachusetts.

==== Exercise "Nanook" ====
Initially, it had been planned to decommission Alcona at Norfolk so that she might be returned to the War Shipping Administration and laid up in the James River to await further disposition. However, on 18 April 1946, Captain Richard H. Cruzen, prospective commanding officer of an Arctic exercise, code named "Nanook" requested that Alcona be assigned to his task force. The approval of his request prolonged the ship's naval career and, on 27 April the Chief of Naval Operations ordered her assigned to "Nanook".

Alcona arrived at Boston, Massachusetts, shortly before noon on 3 May and moored alongside the destroyer, Willard Keith. Five days later, Captain Robert J. Esslinger (who had won a Navy Cross in USS Kearny (DD-432) and a Silver Star for command of USS Sproston (DD-577) off Okinawa in 1945) relieved Lieutenant Commander H. D. Byington, USNR, .

Initially, "Nanook" had been conceived as a small operation involving only an ice-strengthened rescue tug (ATR) and an icebreaker. Later, however, as the scope of operations expanded to encompass the establishment of advanced weather stations in the Canadian Arctic and in Greenland, it became evident that an increased lift capability was called for.

For the remainder of May and into June, Alcona was prepared at the Boston Navy Yard for her "Arctic service of indefinite duration". Following her sea trials on 25 June, Alcona moored at Castle Island, in Boston Harbor, for final preparations. During her time at Boston, Task Force (TF) 68-consisting of Norton Sound, Northwind, Alcona, Beltrami, Atule, and Whitewood, was activated on 15 June for "Nanook".

As "Nanook" began, Northwind, Whitewood, and Atule proceeded north in mid-July, followed shortly thereafter by Norton Sound and Beltrami. Finally, after being held at Boston to load delayed supplies for the Weather Bureau, Alcona, the last ship of the "Nanook" force to get underway, sailed at 13:10 on 18 July for Greenland. Task Force 68 was now at sea; and, as Capt. Cruzen later reported, ". . . an unusual force it was, too: one seaplane tender, one icebreaker, one submarine, one net tender converted into an icebreaker, and two cargo vessels." Eight days later, as Alcona was steaming across Baffin Bay, she received orders to proceed to Thule, unescorted. Favorable ice conditions and good visibility made the passage possible and enabled Alcona to anchor in North Star Bay, off Thule, at 19:28 on 27 July.

Despite the descent of a dense, pea-soup fog that hampered the operation of boats to transfer cargo ashore and, later, a brisk 35-knot (65-kilometre-per-hour; 40-mile-per-hour) offshore breeze, Alcona's discharge of cargo and heavy equipment proceeded apace and made it possible for the Army's 1887th Engineer Aviation Battalion to commence work on the 4,000-foot (1,200-metre) airstrip planned for Thule. Meanwhile, Alcona's Captain Esslinger was proving to be an able diplomat, smoothing the waters disturbed by the American "landings" on Greenland's soil. Esslinger's tact and diplomacy encouraged cordial relations with the people of the gigantic island and convinced them that there was no cause for alarm.

Alcona completed unloading by 19 August, and the Weather Bureau personnel who had been embarked soon took up quarters ashore. The construction work had proceeded well by that time; and, on 28 August, Captain Esslinger reported to the task force commander that 2,800 ft (850 m) of runway had been completed and that the field could now take C-42 traffic, estimating that the field would be complete by mid-September. On the 22d, Alcona had helped cement American-Danish ties when the Royal Danish Navy surveying tender Ternan ran aground on the rocks at the entrance to North Star Bay at 03:25. One of the cargo ships' landing craft, an LCM, pulled Ternan off without difficulty. Soon thereafter, the Army construction crews, together with members of the small Naval Construction Battalion (CB) detachment, helped Danish carpenters in moving cement and lumber from Thule to the building site nearby.

Ternan, apparently in North Star Bay to ascertain American intentions in the area, found nothing "out of order" in the activities going on there and departed North Star Bay shortly after mid-day on 24 August. However, a bit before midnight, lookouts sighted Ternan preparing to reenter North Star Bay. She soon ran aground again; and a boat arrived alongside Alcona, bringing a Danish lieutenant who requested a doctor and a pharmacist's mate to help a wounded Danish seaman who had suffered a 12-gauge shotgun wound in the head. Brought on board for treatment, the seaman immediately underwent an emergency operation on board Alcona and responded well to the surgery. Alcona's doctor then told the Danish vessel's commanding officer, a Commander Tegner, that the man could not be moved for at least four days. When Tegner remonstrated that he had to return to Godthaab posthaste, Captain Esslinger assured the Danish officer that if no other means of transportation could be provided, Alcona would return the man to Godthaab or to any other convenient Greenland port while en route to the United States. The Danish commander accepted Esslinger's offer gratefully.

However, toward the end of August, ice conditions around Thule harbor became a grave concern while Alcona was underway for soundings on 31 August and on 2 and 4 September. After the arrival of the Coast Guard buoy tender Evergreen on 2 September, Alcona assisted in unloading cargo and disembarking Danish weathermen from her and, with the American airstrip and weather station nearing completion, began reloading excess equipment and cargo handling machinery for return to Boston.

With the airstrip finished 10 days ahead of schedule, Alcona was ready for sea by 6 September but remained at North Star Bay to be able to assist the Danish schooner North Star, slated to arrive within days. Alcona was not forced to tarry long, for the awaited North Star reached Thule on schedule. Alcona immediately turned to help unload weather station equipment and building materials, completing the task by noon on 10 September.

Underway in company with Northwind at 13:00 on the 10th, both ships stood clear of the fjord, and headed south. The "Nanook" historian recorded the scene graphically: "The weather was fine, very clear and only a wisp of breeze. Very fittingly for our last look at the northward, the whole area from the mouth of North Star Bay to several miles down Melville Bay was cluttered with thousands of big icebergs. Sparkling in the sunlight they were a striking sight."

Three hours after their departure, the two ships parted company, Alcona proceeding to Arsuk to disembark the wounded, but recovering, Danish seaman. En route, however, Alcona ran into a severe storm that swept across Davis Strait on 12 September. She suffered the least of the three ships caught in the gale, Whitewood was forced to heave to in heavy seas for 36 hours in winds that sometimes reached 55 kn (102 km/h; 63 mph); Northwind rolled and pitched, giving all hands a rough ride. Although the storm put Alcona a day behind her schedule, she reached Arsuk Fjord without mishap on 15 September and that morning transferred Quartermaster Richard B. Anderson, Royal Danish Navy, to Sorrell, off Simiutak Island. A Danish surgeon subsequently sent a dispatch to the Navy expressing his appreciation for the "outstanding brain surgery and exceptional medical job performed" by Alcona's doctor.

Ultimately, Alcona reached President Roads, Boston, early in the evening of 20 September, the last ship of "Nanook" to return home.

==== Atlantic service ====
Departing Boston to load cargo at Bayonne between 15 and 18 October 1946, Alcona sailed for Argentia, Newfoundland, and arrived there on the 22d. The ship made another voyage to Greenland, discharging cargo at Narsarsuaq, 12 to 20 December, and Grønnedal, 21 to 23 December, and then spent Christmas of 1946 at sea, bound for Argentia, which she reached on the 29th. She subsequently got underway for Bayonne on New Year's Day, 1947. After a brief stint of repairs at Norfolk, Alcona returned to the familiar waters of Bayonne and New York City in late January 1947. From Bayonne, she carried out a busy schedule of cargo-carrying operations as a unit of the Atlantic Fleet's Service Force through the summer of 1947, numbering Argentia; St. John's, Newfoundland; Bermuda; San Juan, Puerto Rico; and Guantánamo Bay as her ports of call. Interspersed were voyage repairs at Boston or Bayonne and a tender availability alongside the repair ship Vulcan at Newport, 3 to 20 June 1947.

===== SS York incident =====
That fall, she suffered the only mishap of her career. Underway on 22 October 1947 from the Naval Ammunition Depot at Leonardo, N.J., the ship reached the Naval Supply Depot, Norfolk, on the evening of the 23d and then shifted to an anchorage where, between 10:00 and 14:53 on 24 October, she took on board a cargo of ammunition from an ammunition lighter moored alongside. Underway shortly after noon on the following day, Alcona was proceeding to San Juan, Puerto Rico, when, at 01:40, she collided with the Pacific Tanker Line's vessel, SS York. The two ships struck bow to bow at about a 60-degree angle. Alcona sounded the general alarm. The ships soon parted but then struck again, the unidentified ship's stern scraping the cargo vessel's starboard quarter. Alcona's executive officer promptly reported to the bridge that the ship's starboard bow had been torn leaving a hole from frame four port to frame nine, between the first and second decks, and that the starboard anchor was missing.

York reported a large hole in her port bow just aft of the anchor and that the damage extended below her waterline. Her stern was also badly dented. Alcona asked if the latter required assistance, but the merchantman's master replied that his ship was seaworthy and would proceed to New York unless Alcona required help. About 03:23, "after determining that the extent of damage was such that it was safe to proceed," Alcona moved slowly ahead, shaping course for Norfolk, with a watch on the foc'sle to take soundings in the ship's number one hold every 15 minutes. Survey parties had found that the ammunition cargo, except for two bombs which had gone adrift, was safe. A chief boatswain's mate and a working party soon secured the way ward bombs. At 17:09 that evening, Alcona moored at NOB, Norfolk, at the naval supply depot.

==== Later activities ====
After repairs at the Norfolk Naval Shipyard that included a drydocking from 5 to 26 November, Alcona got underway for Charleston, South Carolina, on 29 November and entered the navy yard at that port on 1 December. The ship underwent further repairs there that lasted into March 1948. She then conducted her first transatlantic cargo-carrying voyage, getting underway from Norfolk on the afternoon of 25 March 1948. During the course of her cruise, she touched at Valletta, Malta, 14 to 19 April; Port Miseno, Italy, 20 to 22 April; and Naples, Italy, 22 to 24 April; before calling at Casablanca, French Morocco, 29 to 5 May, on the voyage back to Norfolk, Virginia, which she reached on 18 May.

Departing Norfolk on 6 July after operating locally in the waters of the Tidewater region, Alcona sailed for Earle, New Jersey, reaching that destination the following day to load a cargo of explosives and pyrotechnic materials. Sailing on 30 July, Alcona. subsequently discharged her cargo at Trinidad, British West Indies, 8 to 28 August; and at Coco Solo, 17 to 25 September, before arriving back at Leonardo, New Jersey, on 3 October. The ship made one more voyage, from Leonardo to Argentia and discharged her cargo from 29 November to 7 December. Returning to Norfolk on 13 December, Alcona spent the remainder of 1948 in that port. Over the following years, Alcona's routine varied little from what had gone before. Besides ranging from Bermuda to Argentia and from Guantanamo Bay to the Panama Canal Zone, she made a second transatlantic voyage to carry cargo to Casablanca in the autumn of 1950. During the nine years that the ship operated in the Atlantic, she made over 40 round-trip voyages with cargo to support fleet operations from Thule to Trinidad and from Argentia to Eleuthera.

== Final decommissioning ==
Alcona was decommissioned 5 May 1955, she was struck from the Naval Register on 1 April 1960. She was laid up as part of the Charleston Group, Atlantic Reserve Fleet from the time she was decommissioned until she was sold. Her title was returned to the Maritime Commission on 28 July 1960, and sold the same day to Hugo Neu Steel Products for scrapping which was completed on 31 October 1961.

== Bibliography ==
- "Alcona". Dictionary of American Naval Fighting Ships. Naval History and Heritage Command. 18 June 2015.
- "C1 Cargo Ships". www.ShipbuildingHistory.com. 28 August 2009.
- "USS Alcona (AK-157)". NavSource. 20 November 2015.
