= Sabtang Lighthouse =

Lighthouse in Cagayan Valley, Philippines

Sabtang Lighthouse Chavayan
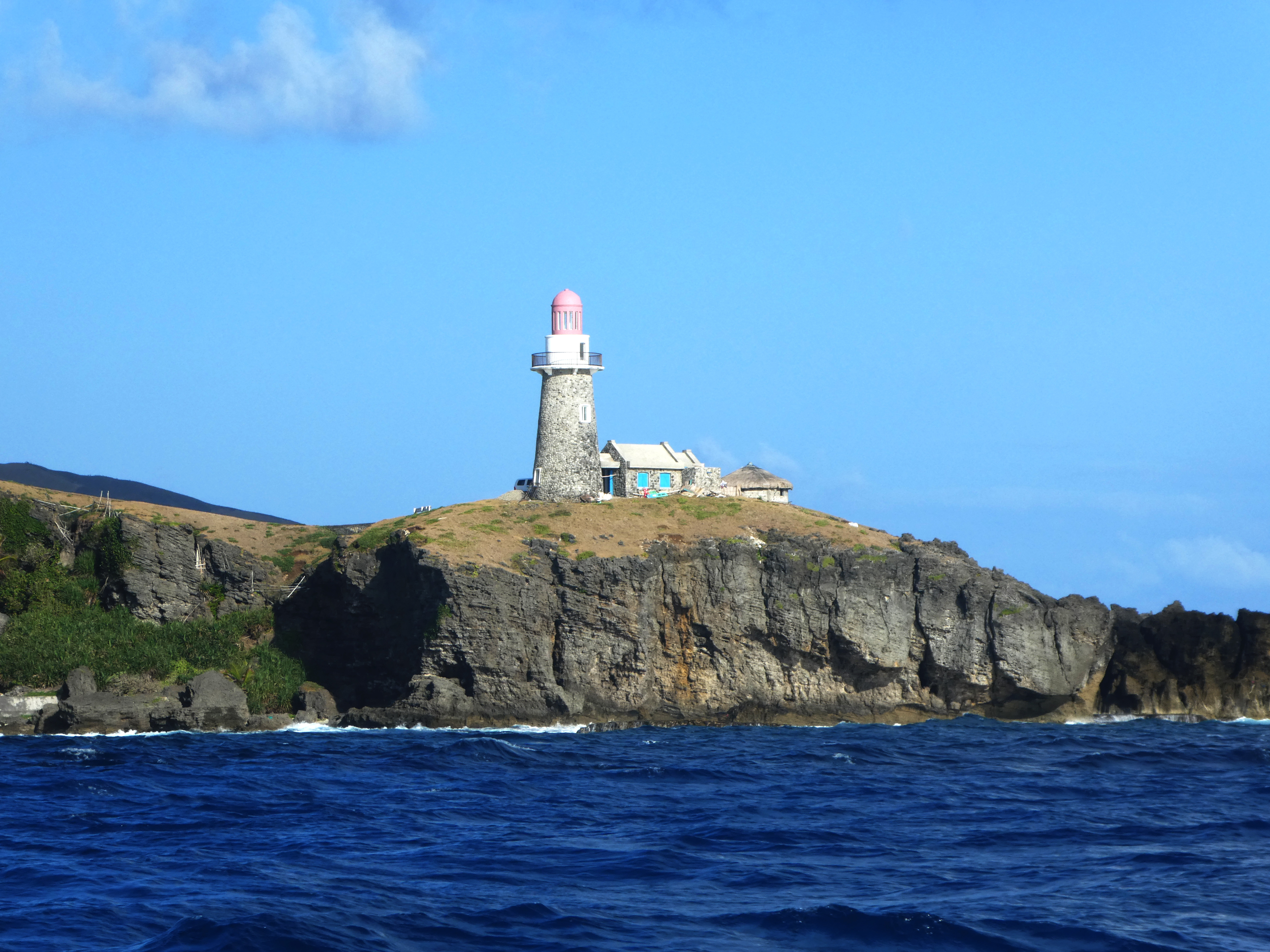
- Location: Sabtang; Batanes; Philippines
- Coordinates: 20°17′09.3″N 121°52′51.8″E

Tower
- Constructed: 2006
- Construction: concrete tower
- Automated: 2006
- Shape: cylindrical tower with balcony and lantern
- Markings: unpainted tower, red lantern, white watch room and trim
- Power source: solar power

Light
- Focal height: 18 metres (59 ft)
- Characteristic: Fl W 5s.

Sabtang Lighthouse is an active lighthouse in Sabtang, Batanes, Philippines.

== See also ==
- List of lighthouses in the Philippines
