= Sabtang =

Municipality in Batanes, Philippines

- Municipality
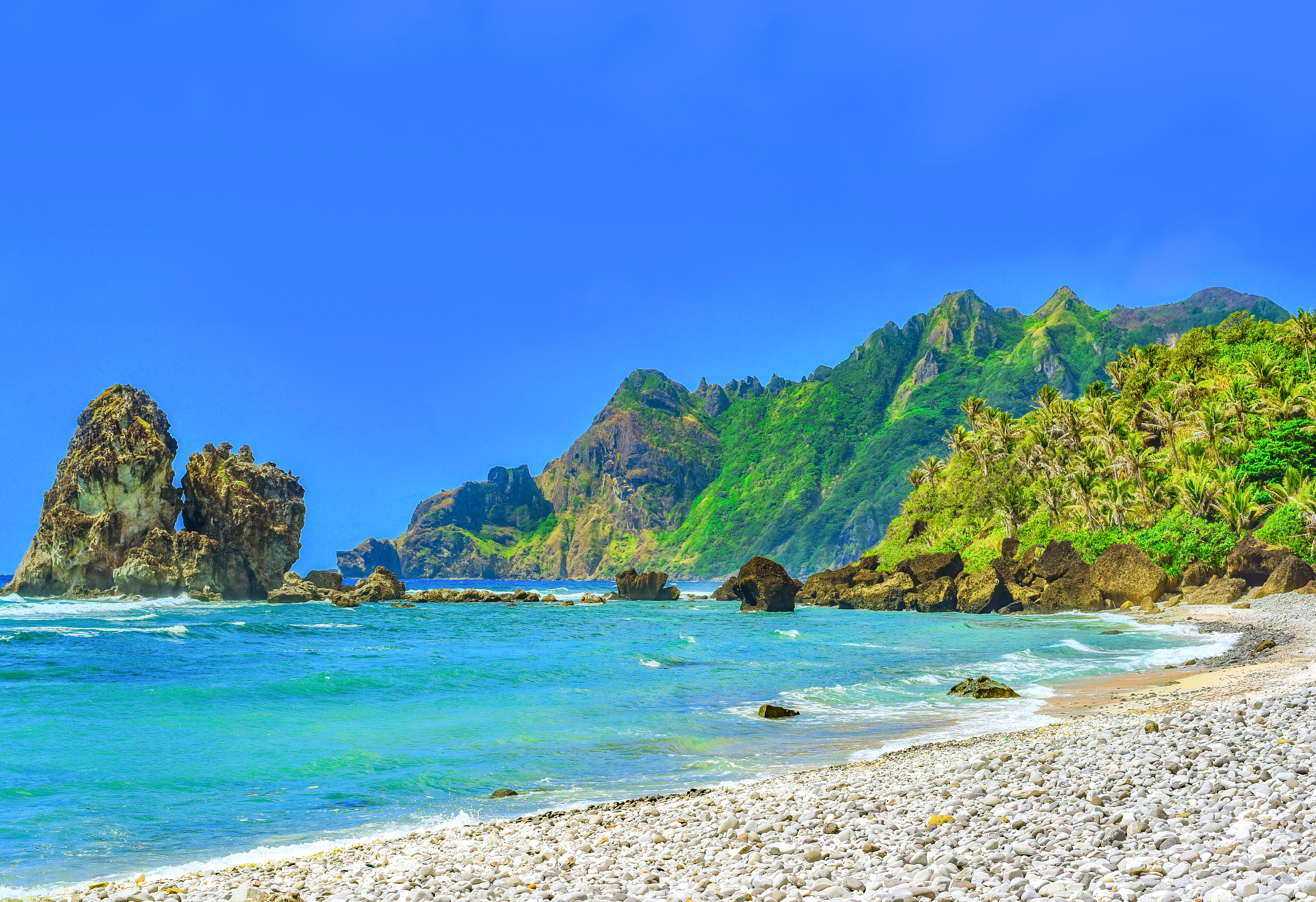
- Shore of the island

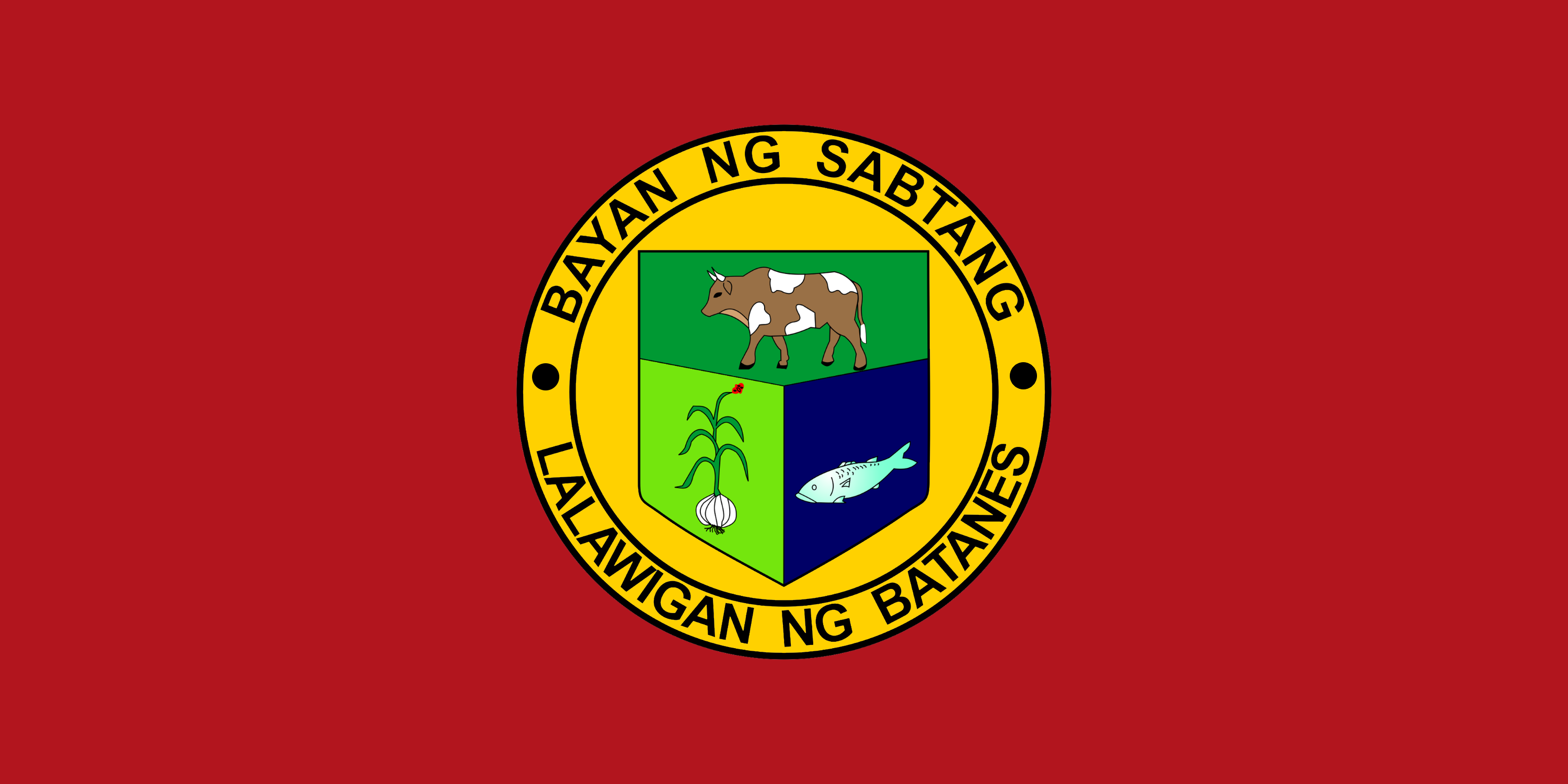
- Flag Seal

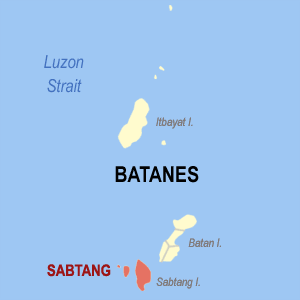
- Map of Batanes with Sabtang highlighted
- Interactive map of Sabtang
- Location within the Philippines Sabtang (Luzon) Sabtang (Batanes)
- Coordinates: 20°20′06″N 121°52′19″E
- Country: Philippines
- Region: Cagayan Valley
- Province: Batanes
- District: Lone district
- Barangays: 6 (see Barangays)

Government
  - Type: Sangguniang Bayan
  - Mayor: Tita Neyala
  - Vice Mayor: Clemente C. Ladreza Jr.
  - Representative: Ciriaco A. Gato Jr.
  - Municipal Council: Members: Jerold Figura; Angel Candel; Hedrick Cervillon; Wally Gecha; Jessie Abas; Harold Clavez; Marcial Armando Alavado; Jerwin Louie Enego
  - Electorate: 1,450 voters (2025)

Area
  - Total: 40.70 km^{2} (15.71 sq mi)
- Elevation: 15.7 m (52 ft)
- Highest elevation: 980 m (3,220 ft)
- Lowest elevation: 0 m (0 ft)

Population (2024 census)
  - Total: 1,774
  - Density: 43.59/km^{2} (112.9/sq mi)
  - Households: 492

Economy
  - Income class: 5th municipal income class
  - Poverty incidence: 5.31% (2023)
  - Revenue: ₱ 69.06 million (2024)
  - Assets: ₱ 183 million (2024)
  - Expenditure: ₱ 58.96 million (2024)
  - Liabilities: ₱ 74.85 million (2024)

Service provider
  - Electricity: Batanes Electric Cooperative (BATANELCO)
- Time zone: UTC+8 (PST)
- ZIP code: 3904
- PSGC: 0200905000
- IDD : area code: +63 (0)78
- Native languages: Ivatan; Tagalog; Ilocano
- Website: www.sabtang-batanes.gov.ph

Sabtang, officially the Municipality of Sabtang (Note: Ivatan: Kavahayan nu Sabtang; Ilocano: Ili ti Sabtang; Tagalog: Bayan ng Sabtang), is a municipality in the province of Batanes, Philippines. According to the 2024 census, it has a population of 1,774 people.

The municipality is the southernmost island municipality in the Batanes Group of Islands. It consists primarily of Sabtang Island and two smaller and uninhabited islands nearby, namely, Ivuhos and Dequey. The municipality is known for its lighthouse and the old stone houses of the Ivatan villages of Chavayan and Savidug. Like Batan Island to the north, Sabtang also has a few Mission-style churches and white sand beaches.

== History ==
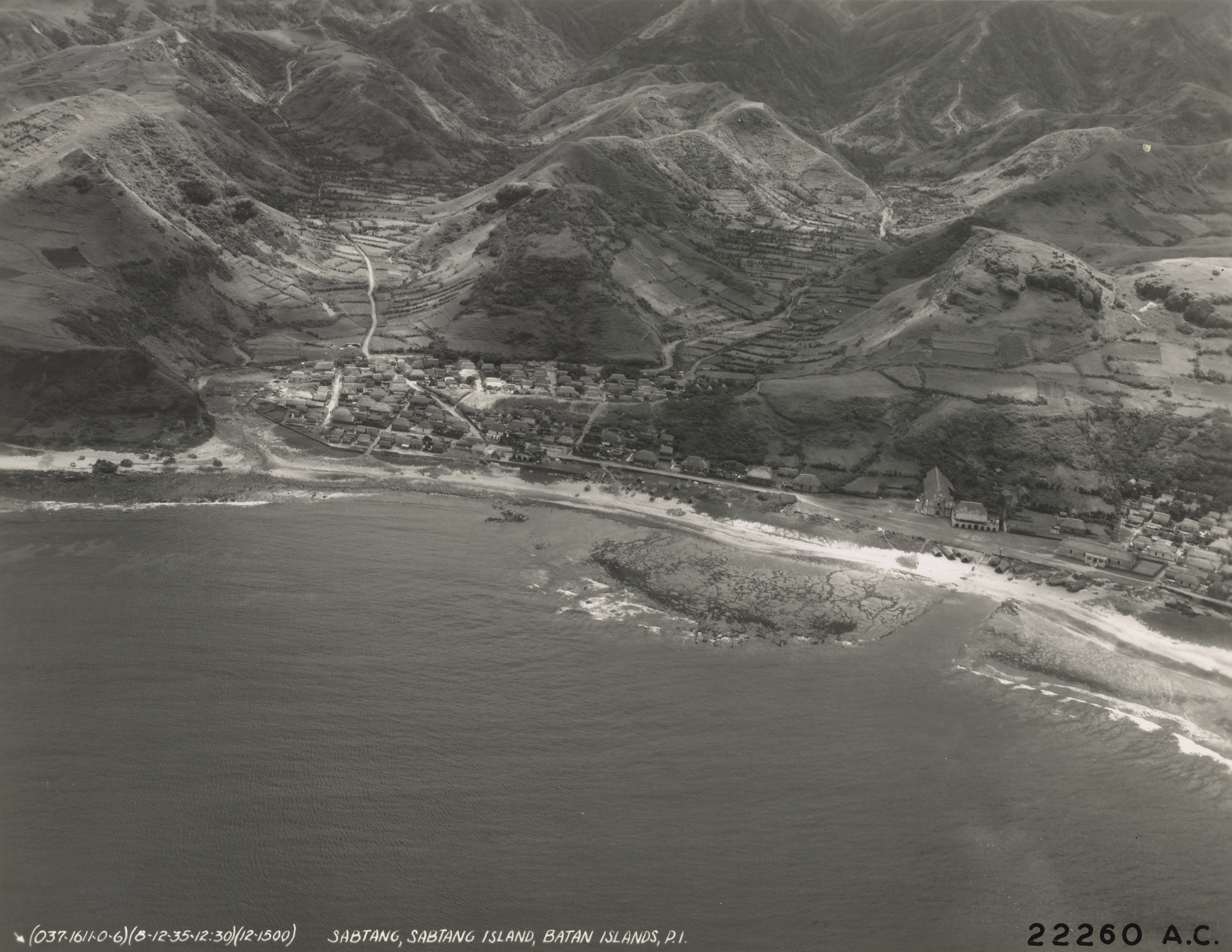
Aerial view of Sabtang, 1935

The Spanish missionary, Father Artiquez, first visited the island of Sabtang in 1786 after receiving an affirmative response from the islanders to learn about the Christian faith. The success of the first visit led to two more evangelical trips resulting in the baptism of 181 children and the study of catechism among the adult natives. The evangelization of Sabtang was cut short due to the failing health of the Spanish missionaries. For this, the inhabitants of Sabtang remained faithful to old traditions, especially in the administration of justice by vendetta and murder.

In 1791, the then most powerful chief in Sabtang named Aman Dangat showed defiance of the government of Governor Joaquin del Castillo by killing the Spanish soldiers who went to Sabtang to procure supplies. Lieutenant Tomas Nuñez led the troops to capture the rebels. Aman Dangat was put on trial and allegedly admitted to the crime. While a religious Spanish recorder later claimed that Aman Dangat asked to be baptized, there is no evidence to substantiate this assertion. The inhabitants of Sabtang were then forced to resettle in San Vicente and San Felix in Ivana to be better controlled by the Spanish colonizers.

Some forty years after the resettlement, the Sabteños were allowed to visit their native island. Gradually, these visits allowed them to build homes in their erstwhile land. The government allowed this to happen on the condition that houses should be constructed in the lowlands. To sustain the spiritual care for the Sabteños, a new mission was opened in Sabtang in 1845 under the patronage of Saint Vincent Ferrer, with Father Antonio Vicente as its first vicar. Father Vicente is credited to have built the Sabtang Church, together with a convent, a school, and a courthouse.

== Geography ==
Sabtang is located at 20°20′06″N 121°52′19″E.

According to the Philippine Statistics Authority, the municipality has a land area of 40.70 square kilometres (15.71 sq mi) constituting 18.58% of the 219.01-square-kilometre- (84.56 sq mi) total area of Batanes.

=== Barangays ===
Sabtang is politically subdivided into 6 barangays. These barangays are headed by elected officials: Barangay Captain, Barangay Council, whose members are called Barangay Councilors. All are elected every three years.

PSGC	Barangay	Population			±% p.a.	
		2024		2010		
020905001	Chavayan	8.9%	158	169	▾	−0.47%
020905002	Malakdang (Poblacion)	16.9%	300	245	▴	1.42%
020905003	Nakanmuan	8.1%	143	134	▴	0.45%
020905004	Savidug	12.1%	214	190	▴	0.83%
020905005	Sinakan (Poblacion)	32.0%	568	552	▴	0.20%
020905006	Sumnanga	22.0%	391	347	▴	0.83%
	Total		1,774	1,637	▴	0.56%

=== Climate ===
Climate data for Sabtang, Batanes
Month	Jan	Feb	Mar	Apr	May	Jun	Jul	Aug	Sep	Oct	Nov	Dec	Year
Mean daily maximum °C (°F)	23 (73)	23 (73)	24 (75)	26 (79)	28 (82)	29 (84)	29 (84)	29 (84)	28 (82)	27 (81)	26 (79)	24 (75)	26 (79)
Mean daily minimum °C (°F)	22 (72)	22 (72)	23 (73)	25 (77)	27 (81)	28 (82)	28 (82)	28 (82)	27 (81)	26 (79)	25 (77)	23 (73)	25 (78)
Average precipitation mm (inches)	44 (1.7)	35 (1.4)	29 (1.1)	48 (1.9)	204 (8.0)	238 (9.4)	291 (11.5)	325 (12.8)	304 (12.0)	202 (8.0)	141 (5.6)	60 (2.4)	1,921 (75.8)
Average rainy days	11.1	9.1	8.3	9.2	15.7	17.1	19.4	21.9	21.1	18.4	16.3	12.4	180
Source: Meteoblue

== Demographics ==
Population census of Sabtang
Year	Pop.	±% p.a.
1903	1,763	—
1918	1,665	−0.38%
1939	1,844	+0.49%
1948	1,656	−1.19%
1960	1,766	+0.54%
1970	1,359	−2.58%
1975	1,375	+0.24%
1980	1,409	+0.49%
1990	1,737	+2.12%
1995	1,434	−3.53%
2000	1,678	+3.43%
2007	1,465	−1.85%
2010	1,637	+4.12%
2015	1,621	−0.19%
2020	1,696	+0.96%
2024	1,774	+1.09%
Source: Philippine Statistics Authority

In the 2024 census, Sabtang had a population of 1,774. The population density was 44 inhabitants per square kilometre (110/sq mi).

== Economy ==
Poverty incidence of Sabtang (%)

Source: Philippine Statistics Authority

== Government ==
=== Local government ===
Sabtang, belonging to the lone congressional district of the province of Batanes, is governed by a mayor designated as its local chief executive and by a municipal council as its legislative body in accordance with the Local Government Code. The mayor, vice mayor, and the councilors are elected directly by the people through an election which is being held every three years.

=== Elected officials ===
Members of the Municipal Council (2025–2028)
Position	Name
Congressman	Ciriaco B. Gato Jr.
Mayor	Tita Neyala
Vice-Mayor	Clemente Memen Ladreza
Councilors	Jerold Figura
Councilors	Angel Candel
Councilors	Hedrick Cervillon
Councilors	Wally Gecha
Councilors	Jessie Abas
Councilors	Harold Clavez
Councilors	Marcial Armando Alavado
Councilors	Jerwin Louie Enego

== Education ==
The Schools Division of Batanes governs the town's public education system. The division office is a field office of the DepEd in Cagayan Valley region. The Sabtang Schools District Office governs the public and private elementary and high schools throughout the municipality.

=== Primary and elementary schools ===
- Chavayan Elementary School
- Nakanmuan Elementary School
- Sabtang Central School
- Savidug Elementary School
- Sumnanga Elementary School

=== Secondary school ===
- Sabtang National School of Fisheries

== Gallery ==
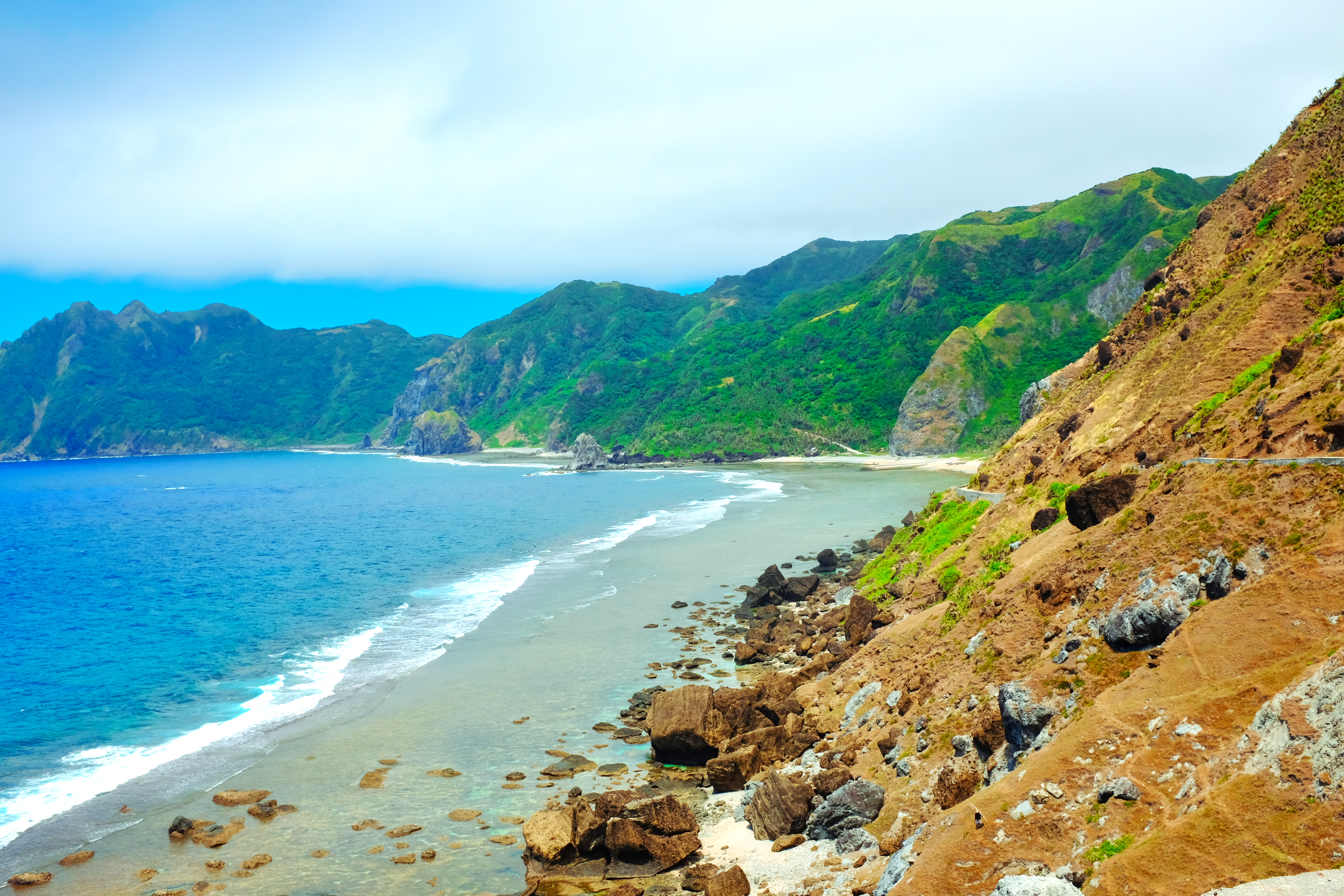
Chavayan in Sabtang Island

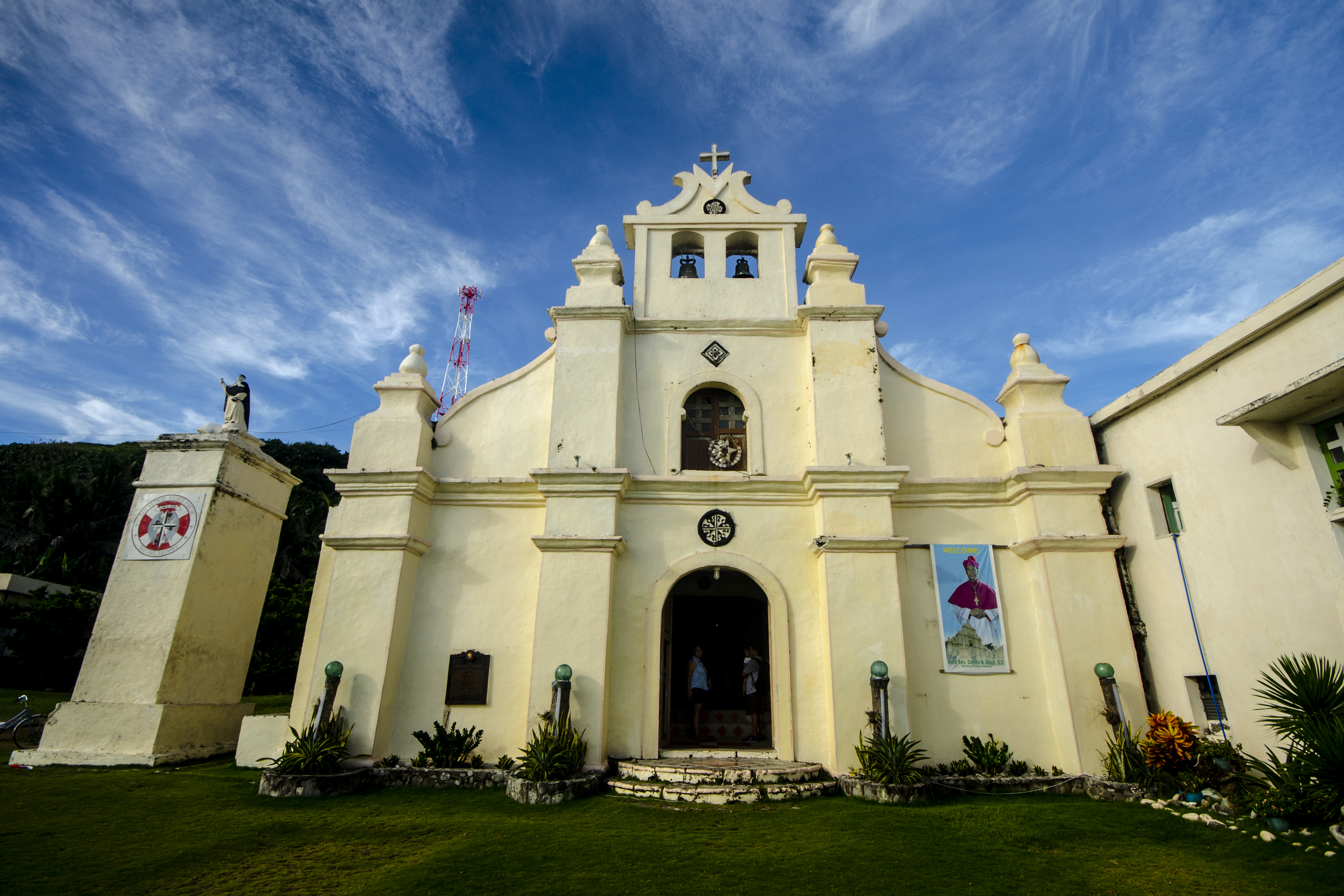
San Vicente Ferrer Church

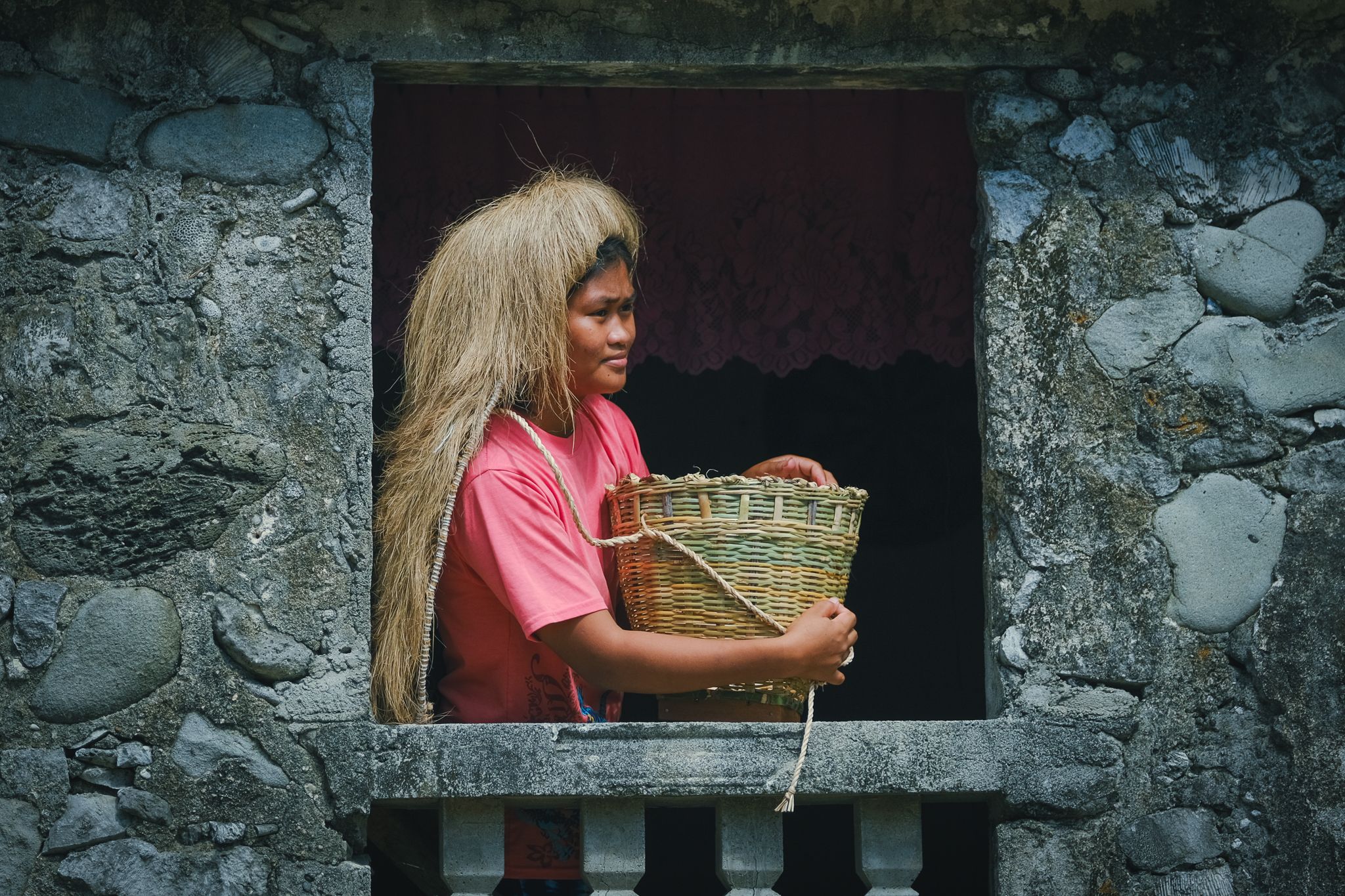
An Ivatan woman wearing a vakul inside a stone house

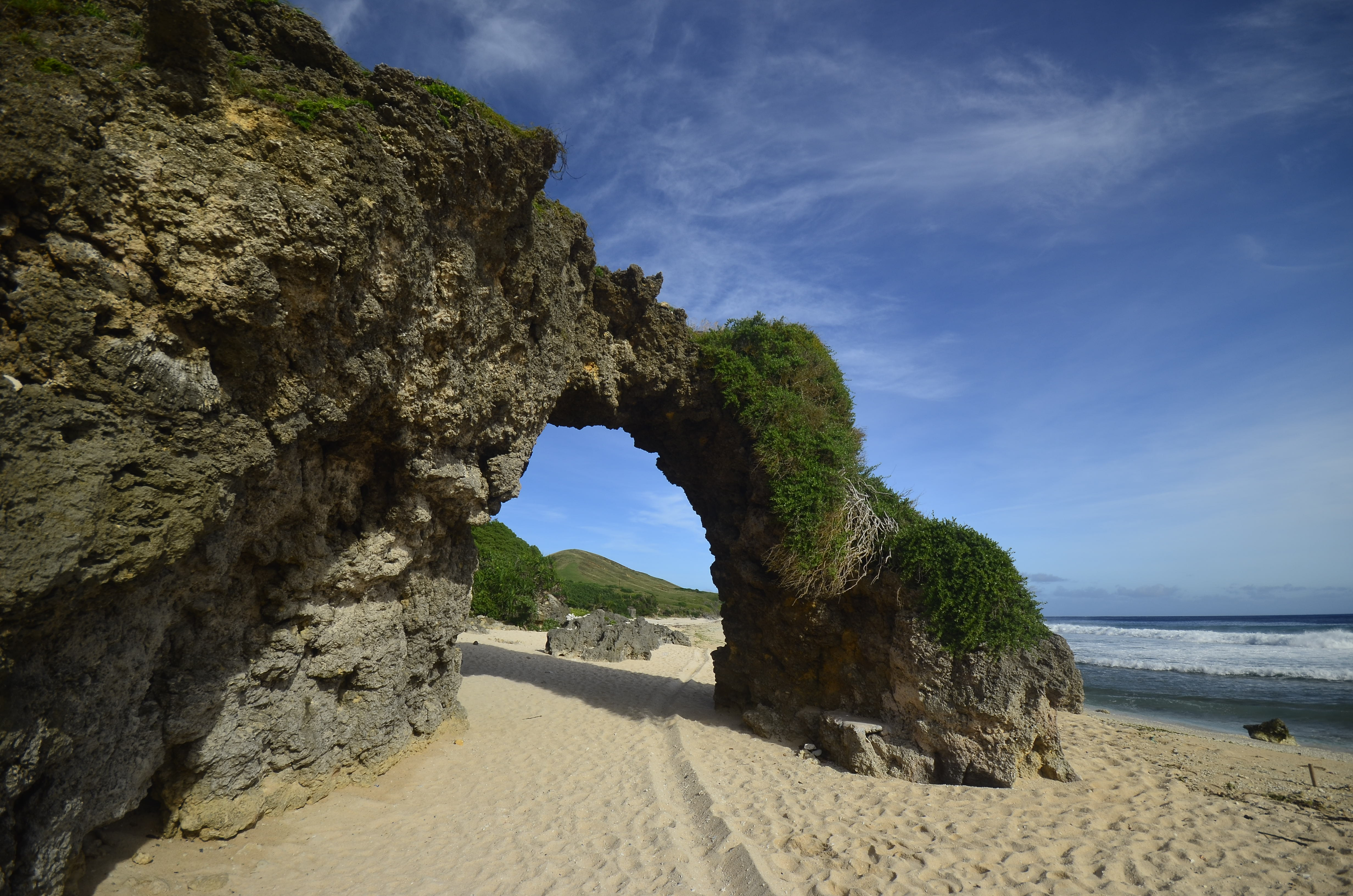
Nakabuang Arch in Morong Beach
