= Dequey =

Island in Batanes, Philippines

- Location within Batanes Location within Luzon Location within Philippines

Geography
- Location: Luzon Strait
- Coordinates: 20°19′59″N 121°47′7″E
- Archipelago: Batanes Group of Islands
- Adjacent to: Balintang Channel

Administration
- Philippines
- Region: Cagayan Valley
- Province: Batanes

Additional information

Dequey is part of the Batanes Islands, the northernmost archipelagic province of the Philippines. The island is a small low-lying feature located about 1/2 mile west of the northwest point of Ivuhos Island. Dequey Island is uninhabited.

An unnamed active submarine volcano rising to within 24 metres (79 ft) of the sea surface is located 3 kilometres (1.9 mi) due west of Dequey Island.

== See also ==
- List of active volcanoes in the Philippines
- List of inactive volcanoes in the Philippines
- List of potentially active volcanoes in the Philippines
- Pacific ring of fire
- Islands of the Philippines
- List of islands
- Desert island
