= USS Whitewood =

US naval ship

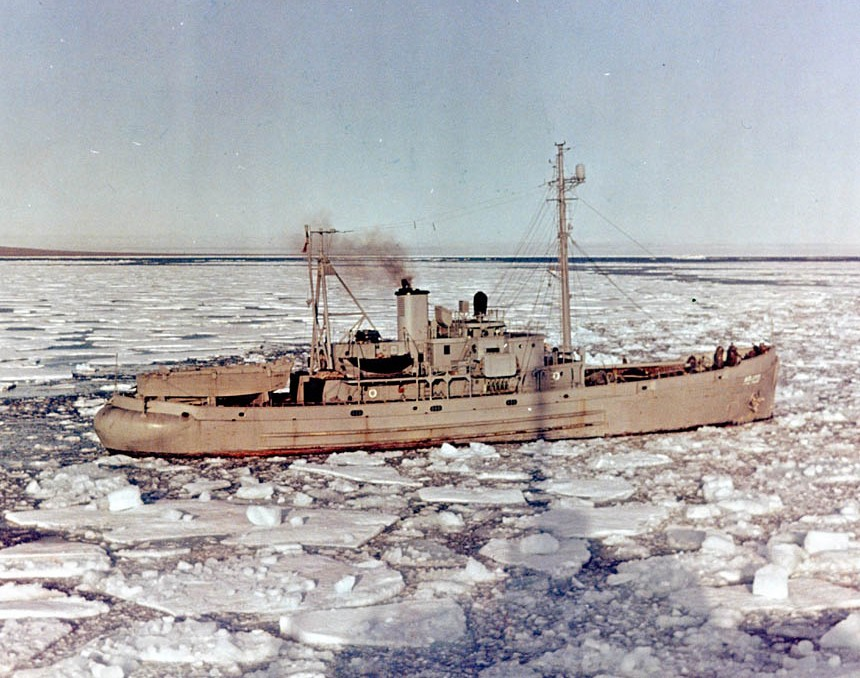
- Whitewood (AG-129) in Cardigan Strait in the Canadian Arctic, 5 August 1947

History

United States
- Builder: Snow Shipyard Incorporated
- Laid down: 24 October 1942
- Launched: 21 April 1944
- Commissioned: 17 July 1944
- Decommissioned: 1 April 1949
- Stricken: 7 June 1949
- Fate: Sold for scrap, 3 March 1950

General characteristics
- Class & type: Ailanthus-class net laying ship
- Displacement: 1,275 long tons (1,295 t)
- Length: 194 ft 6.5 in (59.296 m)
- Beam: 34 ft 7 in (10.54 m)
- Draft: 11 ft 8.5 in (3.569 m)
- Speed: 12.1 knots (13.9 mph; 22.4 km/h)
- Complement: 57
- Armament: 1 × 3"/50 caliber gun

USS Whitewood (YN-84/AN-63/AG-129), a wooden-hulled Ailanthus-class net laying ship of the United States Navy was laid down on 24 October 1942 at Rockland, Maine, by the Snow Shipyard, Inc.; named Whitewood on 5 July 1943; re-classified a net laying ship, AN-63, on 1 January 1944; launched on 21 April 1944; sponsored by Mrs. Eben Kenney; and commissioned on 17 July 1944.

== Service history ==
=== World War II ===
Whitewood tended and laid nets and buoys at Boston, Mass., and at Newport and Melville, R.I., through the remainder of 1944 and into 1945. After a drydocking which began at the Boston Navy Yard in March 1945, the net layer shifted to Portland, Maine, in July. There she worked out of the Navy Net Depot at Little Diamond Island through the end of World War II in August 1945. After shifting to Newport, R.I., at the end of the month, she provided services for the naval net depot there and assisted in laying experimental net installations off Block Island.

=== Operation Nanook ===
Although apparently slated for inactivation on 22 October 1945, Whitewood apparently remained in commission through the end of the year. Early in 1946, the ship was placed in "deferred disposal" status pending possible future use. On 11 April, she was selected to participate in Operation Nanook, Arctic exercises slated to take place in the summer of 1946. Taken to the Boston Naval Shipyard, the ship was under conversion for the rest of the spring and into the summer. During this time, on 20 May, a fire broke out on board the ship in one of her after storerooms and caused "Nanook's" planners to fear that the wooden-hulled ship's services would be lost to the pending operation. Fortunately, the fire was put out before major damage occurred; and the shipyard was able to repair the ship enabling her to take part in "Nanook" as scheduled.

The nucleus of the "Nanook" force, Task Force (TF) 68, consisted of Norton Sound (AVM-1), Atule (SS-403), USCGC Northwind (WAGB-282), Alcona (AK-157), Beltrami (AK-162) and Whitewood. On 3 July, Whitewood departed Boston to rendezvous with Northwind off Greenland.

For the remainder of July and into August, Whitewood operated in the Canadian Arctic, off western Greenland. She transited the Davis Strait to the northern part of Baffin Bay in company with Northwind and Atule and conducted exercises en route. All ships in TF 68 except the two AK's eventually rendezvoused at Melville Bight, Baffin Bay, on 20 July. Whitewood and Atule subsequently accompanied Norton Sound to Thule harbor to recover a PBM Mariner forced down with engine trouble.

From 22 July to 5 August, all activities in "Nanook" centered around Thule; Norton Sound remained at anchor there, in North Star Bay, servicing her two PBM's. Meanwhile, Whitewood and Atule operated from North Star Bay as they conducted exercises and tests in the Smith Sound–Kane Basin area. On 5 August, Norton Sound and Whitewood headed for Dundas Harbor, Devon Island, to attempt air and surface operations there. Unfortunately, the ships found the harbor iced over, with a belt of pack ice extending out three miles down the coast. Northwind later joined the two ships in the vicinity of Dundas Harbor, searching for a suitable anchorage that could accommodate the ships and their attached aircraft. Whitewood succeeded in finding a small, ice-free anchorage at Tay Bay, off northwestern Bylot Island.

In the ensuing weeks, Whitewood reconnoitered the coastal areas in Lancaster, Eclipse, and Jones Sounds, and Prince Regent, Admiralty, and Navy Board Inlets. Operating on this duty in company with Northwind, Whitewood landed shore parties that set up positions ashore to obtain terrestrial navigation "fixes" to dovetail with the photographic coverage obtained from the ships and planes of the project's task force.

Eventually, the summer Arctic weather deteriorated to the point where it hindered Whitewood's surveying efforts — especially her terrestrial fixes. Released from the expedition in early September, Whitewood received her sailing orders on 6 September and soon set her course for Boston. She arrived there on 19 September for repairs.

=== Reclassified as (AG) ===
While at Boston, Whitewood was reclassified a miscellaneous auxiliary (AG) on 14 January 1947 and was given the alphanumeric hull number AG-129. She conducted refresher training in Chesapeake Bay soon thereafter and returned to Boston on 9 July to prepare for the next round of Arctic operations.

=== Return to the Arctic ===
She sailed for the Canadian Arctic in company with the Navy's newest icebreaker, Edisto, to participate in the successor to Operation "Nanook." The basic missions for TF 68 in this Arctic stint were the resupply of existing weather stations and the establishment of a new one at Melville Harbor, Ville Island.

Whitewood performed reconnaissance and survey work during the expedition, while Wyandot (AKA-92) completed her assigned task, supplying the weather station at Thule. When Whitewood and Edisto tried to force their way through the ice to deliver needed supplies to the station at Slidre Fjord, the heavy pack ice damaged Whitewood's bow sheathing, steering engine, and propeller, necessitating her return to Boston for repairs. After transferring her cargo to Edisto — which eventually forced her way through the pack ice to Slidre Fjord — Whitewood headed home.

Whitewood underwent repairs at Boston between 1 September and 18 October before sailing for Bayonne, N.J., for an overhaul that lasted through the end of October. She headed back northward and operated out of Argentia, Newfoundland; and Grondal and Søndre Strømfjord, Greenland; into late 1948 supporting the International Ice Patrol. During the tour, she touched at such ports as Narsarssuak, Grondal, Argentia, and Breton.

On 6 December 1948, while the ship was operating in heavy pack ice, a shifting floe sprung a leak in her port chain locker. A seam opened there, and the ship began to fill uncontrollably. In order to save the ship, her commanding officer, Lt. Cpmdr. F. E. Clark, ordered her beached. Meanwhile, Edisto, which had just completed refresher training in Narragansett Bay, was summoned to join Hoist (ARS-40) in assisting Whitewood out of her predicament. Eventually, with a patch applied to her side, Whitewood made Boston on 8 January 1949 — exactly one month after her serious accident.

Subsequently, cleared for disposal on 12 March, she was decommissioned at Newport on 1 April and struck from the Navy list on 7 June. She was then sold to Walter H. Wimms of Los Angeles, Calif., on 3 March 1950 and scrapped.

== Sources ==
- Photo gallery of USS Whitewood (AG-129) at NavSource Naval History
