= USS Beltrami =

Cargo ship of the United States Navy

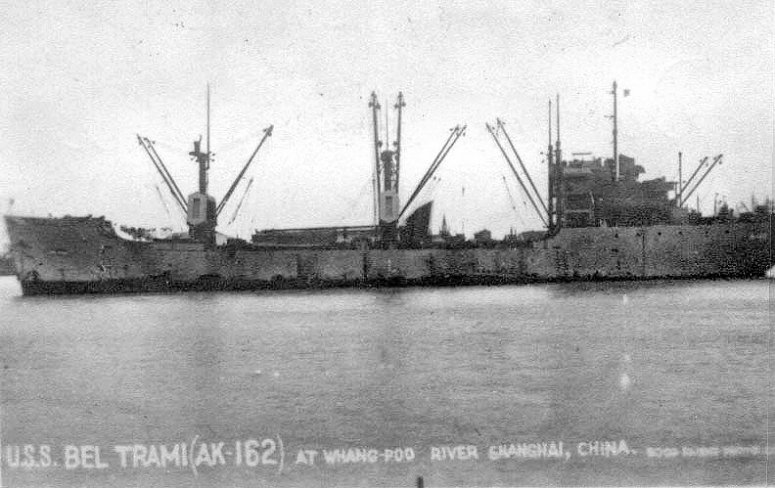
- USS Beltrami (AK-162) at anchor, on the Whangpoo River, off Shanghai, China, c. 18 November to 26 January 1946

History

United States
- Name: Beltrami
- Namesake: Beltrami County, Minnesota
- Ordered: as type (C1-M-AV1) hull, MC hull 2107
- Builder: Kaiser Shipbuilding Co., Richmond, California
- Yard number: 64
- Laid down: 18 July 1944
- Launched: 26 September 1944
- Sponsored by: Mrs. Marvin A. Thrash
- Acquired: 4 January 1945
- Commissioned: 4 January 1945
- Decommissioned: 10 November 1955
- Stricken: 1 April 1960
- Identification: Hull symbol: AK-162; Code letters: NEFU
- Fate: Sold for scrapping, 28 July 1960, to Hugo Neu Steel Products

General characteristics
- Class & type: Alamosa-class cargo ship
- Type: C1-M-AV1
- Tonnage: 5,032 long tons deadweight (DWT)
- Displacement: 2,382 long tons (2,420 t) (standard); 7,450 long tons (7,570 t) (full load)
- Length: 388 ft 8 in (118.47 m)
- Beam: 50 ft (15 m)
- Draft: 21 ft 1 in (6.43 m)
- Installed power: 1 × Nordberg, TSM 6 diesel engine; 1,750 shp (1,300 kW)
- Propulsion: 1 × propeller
- Speed: 11.5 kn (21.3 km/h; 13.2 mph)
- Capacity: 3,945 t (3,883 long tons) DWT; 9,830 cu ft (278 m^{3}) (refrigerated); 227,730 cu ft (6,449 m^{3}) (non-refrigerated)
- Complement: 15 Officers; 70 Enlisted
- Armament: 1 × 3 in (76 mm)/50 caliber dual purpose gun (DP); 6 × 20 mm (0.8 in) Oerlikon anti-aircraft (AA) cannons

USS Beltrami (AK-162) was an Alamosa-class cargo ship commissioned by the U.S. Navy for service in World War II. She was responsible for delivering troops, goods and equipment to locations in the war zone.

== Service history ==
Beltrami was laid down under a Maritime Commission contract, MC hull 2107, on 18 July 1944, by Kaiser Cargo, at Richmond, California; launched on 26 September 1944; sponsored by Mrs. Marvin A. Thrash; and acquired by the Navy and commissioned on 4 January 1945. After fitting out at San Francisco, California, Beltrami got underway on 21 January for shakedown operations out of San Pedro, California. There, her crew members practiced loading and unloading cargo and familiarized themselves with Beltrami's diesel engines. On 8 February, she loaded frozen food and steamed north to Longview, Washington. There, the cargo ship received a load of lumber from the Weyerhauser Co. before sailing west to Hawaii, arriving in Pearl Harbor on 1 March. Over the next two weeks, the crew unloaded lumber at Port Allen, Kauai, and Nawiliwili Bay, Kauai, before returning to Pearl Harbor.

Assigned to the Service Force, Pacific Fleet, Beltrami sailed for the Solomon Islands on 21 March. Arriving at Guadalcanal on 3 April, the cargo ship discharged her supplies and immediately began loading for a supply run to the Admiralty Islands. Underway from the Solomons on the 8th, she arrived at Manus Island on 12 April. After unloading her cargo—Manus was a support base for the ongoing operations in the Philippines and the Ryukyus -- Beltrami sailed to Ulithi, Caroline Islands, on the 25th, anchoring there four days later. Tasked with supporting the Okinawa campaign, Beltrami proceeded to the Philippines on 20 May, arriving in San Pedro Bay, Leyte, on 25 May. She then spent the next month discharging and loading fleet freight before sailing for the Mariana Islands on 22 June. Beltrami operated at Apra Harbor, Guam, for the next four weeks before heading to Ulithi on 21 July. She remained in reserve at that atoll through the end of the war on 15 August.

Beltrami sailed to the Philippines late in August and spent nine weeks operating in the Leyte area, providing passenger and cargo service to the forces ashore. On 8 November, tasked with supporting American occupation forces in China, the cargo ship departed San Pedro Bay for Shanghai, arriving there on 16 November. She remained there until leaving for California on 27 January 1946, mooring in San Francisco harbor on 23 February. Ordered to the US East Coast, Beltrami got underway on 15 March, passed through the Panama Canal on the 28th, and arrived in Norfolk, Virginia, on 8 April.

=== Operation Nanook ===
While at that base, the ship received orders to prepare for Operation Nanook—a project to set up a system of weather stations in the Arctic regions of the Western Hemisphere. She first made brief stops at Baltimore, Maryland, and Philadelphia, Pennsylvania, in mid-April, both to obtain cold weather gear and to receive equipment modifications for extended sub-zero operations. Beltrami then sailed to New York, embarking LCVPs and picket boats in early May, before moving on to Boston, Massachusetts, to load a detachment of US Marines. Beltrami sailed independently on 15 July, heading north toward the Strait of Belle Isle, Newfoundland.

On 25 July, after passing through the Labrador Sea and the Davis Strait, Beltrami rendezvoused with the icebreaker Northwind in Lancaster Sound, well above the Arctic Circle. Two days later, the ships entered Dundas Harbor, Devon Island, to disembark the marine detachment. Upon entering the harbor, Northwind grounded on an uncharted pinnacle but was refloated about ten hours later without serious damage. Meanwhile, the marine detachment went ashore and set up a temporary camp at the base of an inactive glacier.

Beltrami then proceeded to Thule, North Star Bay, Greenland, where she joined the seaplane tender Norton Sound, net-laying ship Whitewood and sister ship Alcona in Task Force (TF) 68. Her crew unloaded the cargo and heavy equipment needed to construct a weather station and an emergency airstrip, before the ship returned to Dundas Harbor on 20 August and reembarked the marines after their three-week field expedition. Returning to Thule on the 22nd, she sailed for home two days later and arrived in Boston on 3 September.

==== Later operations ====
Over the next two years, Beltrami plied the Atlantic coastal waters of North America, delivering general cargo from Bayonne, New Jersey, and Norfolk to naval stations as far south as the Panama Canal Zone and as far north as Argentia, Newfoundland. She also made regular visits to Guantanamo Bay, Cuba; St. George, Bermuda; and Roosevelt Roads, Puerto Rico. On 11 February 1949, following the permanent establishment of the U.S. 6th Fleet the previous year, Beltrami began the first of three voyages to the Mediterranean Sea. She visited Casablanca, Morocco; Athens, Greece; and Haifa, Israel; before coming back to Norfolk on 15 April. Beltrami returned to the Mediterranean between 8 October and 2 December of that year and again between 15 June and 7 August 1951. In between these cruises, she also made one voyage to British ports, visiting Gibraltar, Plymouth, and Londonderry between 20 July and 8 September 1950.

For the remainder of her service, Beltrami operated out of Earle, New Jersey, and Norfolk, primarily servicing ports and installations in the West Indies. Her most common duty was the shuttling of passengers and cargo between Guantánamo Bay, Roosevelt Roads, and Trinidad. Made obsolete by larger and faster cargo ships, Beltrami sailed from Norfolk to Charleston, South Carolina, in late July 1955, arriving at the navy yard there on the 29th. Placed in commission, in reserve, on 1 August 1955, she was towed to Savannah, Georgia, on 28 August, and was decommissioned on 10 November 1955. Her name was struck from the Naval Vessel Register on 1 April 1960, and she was transferred to the Maritime Administration on 21 June 1960. She was sold for scrap to Hugo Neu Steel Products on 29 August 1960.

== Military awards and honors ==
The record does not indicate battle stars for Beltrami. However, her crew was eligible for the following medals and campaign ribbons:

- China Service Medal (extended)
- American Campaign Medal
- Asiatic-Pacific Campaign Medal
- World War II Victory Medal
- National Defense Service Medal

== Bibliography ==
- Francis, Timothy L. (24 June 2015). "Beltrami". Dictionary of American Naval Fighting Ships. Naval History and Heritage Command.
- "C1 Cargo Ships". ShipbuildingHistory.com. 28 August 2009.
- "USS Beltrami (AK-162)". NavSource. 18 July 2014.
