= Ivuhos =

Island in Batanes, Philippines

Ibugos
Native name: Ivujos
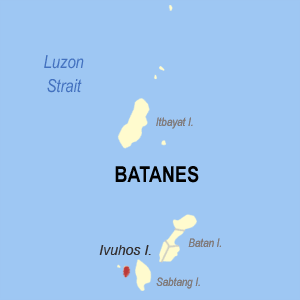

- Location within Batanes Location within Luzon Location within Philippines

Geography
- Location: Luzon Strait
- Coordinates: 20°19′8″N 121°48′31″E
- Archipelago: Batanes Group of Islands
- Adjacent to: Balintang Channel
- Length: 4.0 km (2.49 mi)
- Width: 1.8 km (1.12 mi)
- Highest elevation: 90 m (300 ft)

Administration
- Philippines
- Region: Cagayan Valley
- Province: Batanes
- Municipality: Sabtang

Demographics
- Population: uninhabited

Additional information
- Official website: Batanes Province Official Website

Ivuhos (also known as Ibugos, Ibujos, Vuhus and Ibahos Island) is one of the islands of Batanes, the northernmost province of the Philippines. The uninhabited island is located west of Sabtang Island and is separated by a deep channel nearly 2 kilometres (1.2 mi) wide.

Ivuhos Island is small and rather low, except a hill on the south end. A coral beach before the hill on the eastern side is the only viable landing spot on the island. The shores on both sides of the channel are bordered by reefs. The flood tide sets southward with a velocity from 3 to 4 knots, and the ebb northward.

== People ==
The island is currently uninhabited, but a survey performed by the US Geodetic Service in the early 1900s found a settlement near the south end of the island.

== Geology ==
The island of Ivuhos consists entirely of coral limestone rising in steep cliffs to a height of over 60 metres (200 ft). These surround the island, except on the eastern side where the land rises gently from the fringe of sand dunes and small ponds around the shore, in contrast to the 300 metres (980 ft) agglomerate cliffs of the island of Sabtang less than 2 kilometres (1.2 mi) distant. The surface of Ibujos is gently rolling, but without any streams or definite stream valleys. This condition is partly due to the solubility of the rock which allows water to run off in underground channels, but it is also in large part an effect of the recent date of the uplift which formed the island, which has not allowed sufficient time for the streams to form valleys. The soil seems to be volcanic ash rather than limestone.

The Philippine Institute of Volcanology and Seismology (PHIVOLCS) classified Ivujos Island (listed as Ibahos Island) as an inactive volcano of the Philippines.

An unnamed submarine volcano is located 5 kilometres (3.1 mi) west of Ivujos, which last erupted in 1854. The seamount rises to just 24 metres (79 ft) below the water surface.

== See also ==
- Desert island
- List of islands
