= Johannes V. Jensen Land =

Coordinates: 83°20′N 32°0′W

- Region
- Map of part of Ellesmere Island and far Northern Greenland.

- Location of Johannes V. Jensen Land
- Country: Greenland
- Zone: Northeast Greenland National Park

Dimensions
  - Length: 105 km (65 mi)
  - Width: 55 km (34 mi)
- Elevation: 1,890 m (6,200 ft)

Population
  - Total: Uninhabited

Johannes V. Jensen Land is an area in Peary Land, Northern Greenland. Administratively it lies in the Northeast Greenland National Park zone. The area is remote and currently uninhabited.

Johannes V. Jensen Land is the northernmost region on Earth.

== History ==
This extreme northern area was sparsely inhabited about 2,400 years ago. Its inhabitants were people dependent on hunting muskoxen for survival. The ruins near the head of Frigg Fjord are the northernmost remains of settlements in human history.

This region was named after Danish author Johannes V. Jensen (1873–1950) who was awarded the Nobel Prize in Literature in 1944.

== Geography ==
Johannes V. Jensen Land is a mountainous region, with the Roosevelt Range running across it. Its subranges, the H. H. Benedict Range and Daly Range, rise on the eastern side.

It is bound to the north by the Lincoln Sea and the Wandel Sea and to the south by the Frederick E. Hyde Fjord. The northernmost point is Cape Morris Jesup. To the west lie Gertrud Rask Land and Roosevelt Land. Its easternmost point is Cape Ole Chiewitz, a headland jutting out into the Wandel Sea to the northeast of the mouth of Frederick E. Hyde Fjord and to the southeast of Cape Bridgman.

There are several glaciers in Johannes V. Jensen Land, such as the Malcantone Glacier, the Sif Glacier, the Moore Glacier and the Bertelsen Glacier.

Owing to a structural continuum in the mountains between Johannes V. Jensen Land in the east and Nansen Land in the west, American geologist William E. Davies called the wider range the "Nansen-Jensen Alps" in a work he published in 1972.

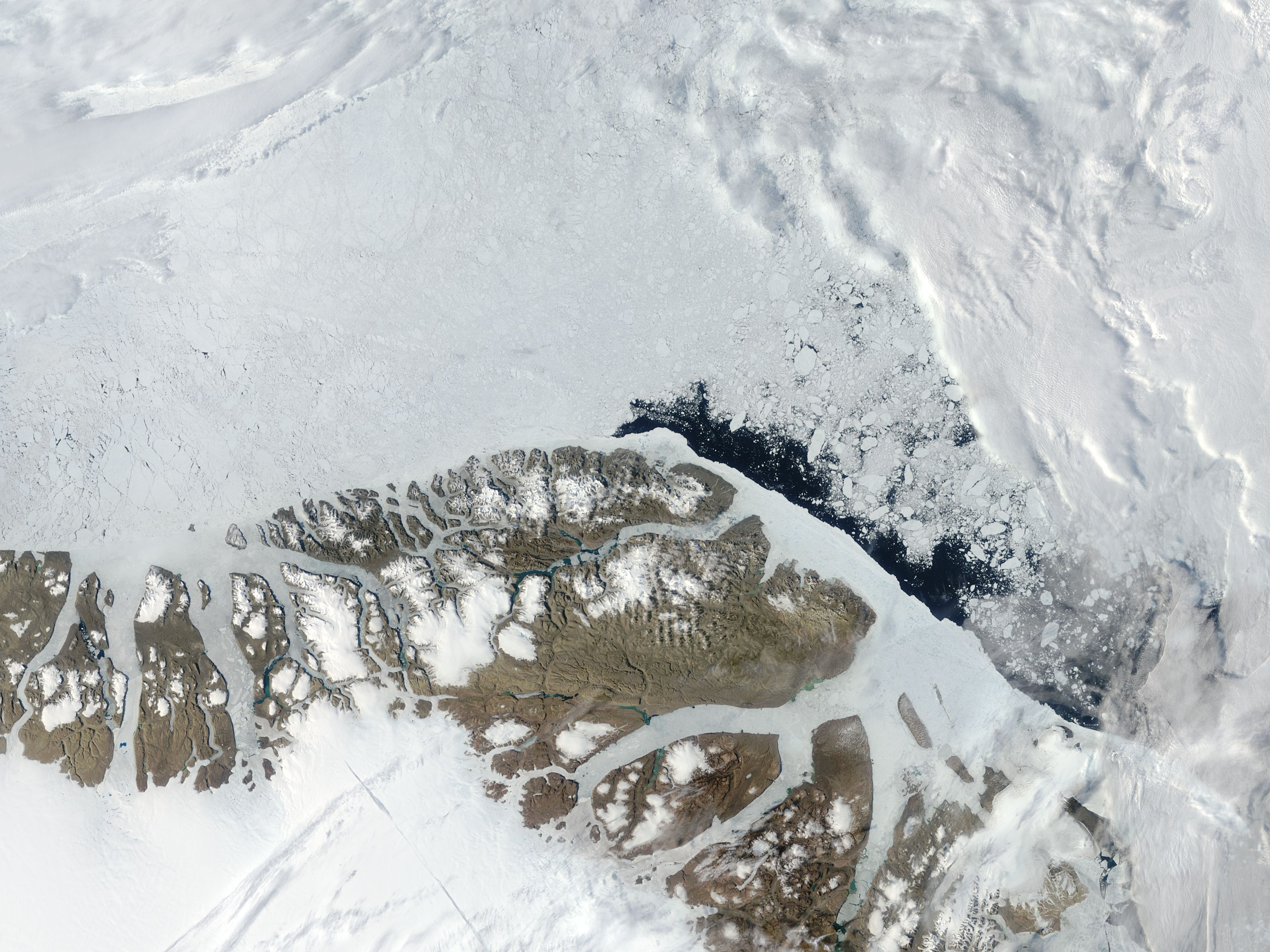
Satellite image of the northern end of Greenland.

== Bibliography ==
- H.P. Trettin (ed.), Geology of the Innuitian Orogen and Arctic Platform of Canada and Greenland. 1991
