= Hunt Fjord =

Fjord in Peary Land, Greenland

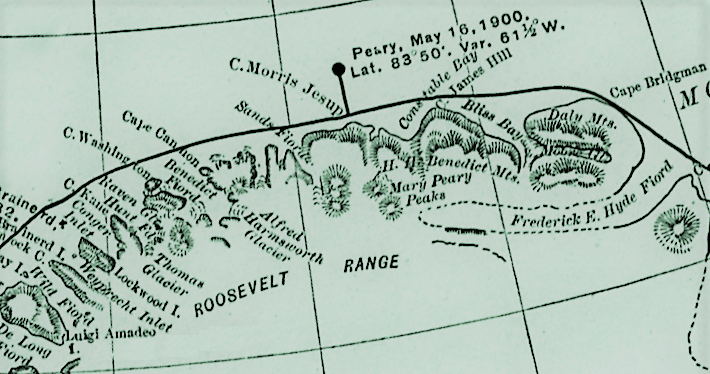
- Roosevelt Range section of Robert Peary's 1900 explorations map "Polar Regions".

- Location in Greenland
- Location: Arctic
- Coordinates: 83°25′N 38°0′W
- Ocean/sea sources: Lincoln Sea
- Basin countries: Greenland
- Max. length: 20 km (12 mi)
- Max. width: 4.5 km (2.8 mi)
- Frozen: All year round
- Settlements: 0

Hunt Fjord is a fjord in Peary Land, northern Greenland. To the north the fjord has its mouth in the Lincoln Sea of the Arctic Ocean. Administratively it belongs to the Northeast Greenland National Park.

This fjord was named by Robert Peary in 1900.

== Geography ==
Hunt Fjord opens to the Lincoln Sea to the east of Conger Sound and to the west of Benedict Fjord. It stretches in a southeast–northwest direction for about 20 km (12 mi).

Cape Kane is the headland on the western and Cape Washington on the eastern side of the mouth. On the western Roosevelt Land side the fjord is under the influence of slow-moving glaciers discharging on both sides of Cape Kane that completely fill it and partially clog neighboring Conger Sund as well. The large Thomas Glacier discharges at the head of Hunt Fjord from the western end of the Roosevelt Range. The Raven Glacier discharges on the eastern side, closer to the mouth, south of Cape Washington. The western shore of the fjord is glaciated with dark pointed nunataks protruding between short valleys filled with glaciers.

Map of Northern Ellesmere Island and far Northern Greenland.

== Bibliography ==
- U.S. Geological Survey Professional Paper, Volume 1386, Part 3

== See also ==
- List of fjords of Greenland
- Peary Land
