= Vernon Tejas =

American mountain climber and mountain guide

Personal information
- Full name: Vernon Edward Tejas
- Nickname: Vern
- Nationality: American
- Born: Vernon Edward Hansel; March 16, 1953 Portland, Oregon
- Occupations: Mountain guide and climber
- Spouse: Carole Schiffman

Climbing career
- Major ascents: Seven Summits; 10 times: Mount Everest; 11 guided summit ascents: Denali; 54 guided 1st solo winter ascent 1st paraglider descent 14:50 speed ascent: Mount Elbrus; 34 guided 3:20 speed ascent paraglide descent: Aconcagua; 25 guided 8:02 speed ascent paraglide descent: Carstensz Pyramid; 3 guided, via Jungle route: Mount Vinson; 39 guided & personal 1st solo ascent 10:20 speed ascent 1st paraglide descent: Kilimanjaro; 15 guided 10:45 speed ascent: Greenland, Gunnbjørn Fjeld; Mount Hunter, Alaska; first winter ascent: Mount Logan, Canada; first winter ascent: Mont Blanc; 3 guided & personal: Mount Rainier; 2 guided: Cho Oyu; 1 guided: Chimborazo; Matterhorn; Mount Kinabalu; Cotopaxi
- Known for: Summiting the Seven Summits in world record time.

Vernon "Vern" Tejas is an American mountain climber and mountain guide. He is the current world record holder in the amount of time taken to summit all of the Seven Summits consecutively, having also previously held the same record. He was also the first person to solo summit several of the world's tallest peaks. Tejas was named one of the top fifty Alaskan athletes of the twentieth century by Sports Illustrated in 2002. In 2012, he was elected to the Alaska Sports Hall of Fame. Tejas plays the harmonica and guitar. He currently resides in Greenwich Village, New York.

== Life and times ==
Vernon Tejas was born on 16 March 1953 at Portland, Oregon, the son of Phillip Sand Hansel and Janice Elaine Hansel. Tejas was born Vernon Edward Hansel and later changed his name to Vernon Tejas.

== Career ==
From Oregon, Tejas headed north and ended up in Alaska. He went to work on The Alaska Pipeline and for Alaska Telecom, and enjoyed tower work where he built and maintained communication towers on North Slope in Alaska. He is now with Alpine Ascents International as a senior international high altitude alpine mountain guide.

== Mountain climbing ==
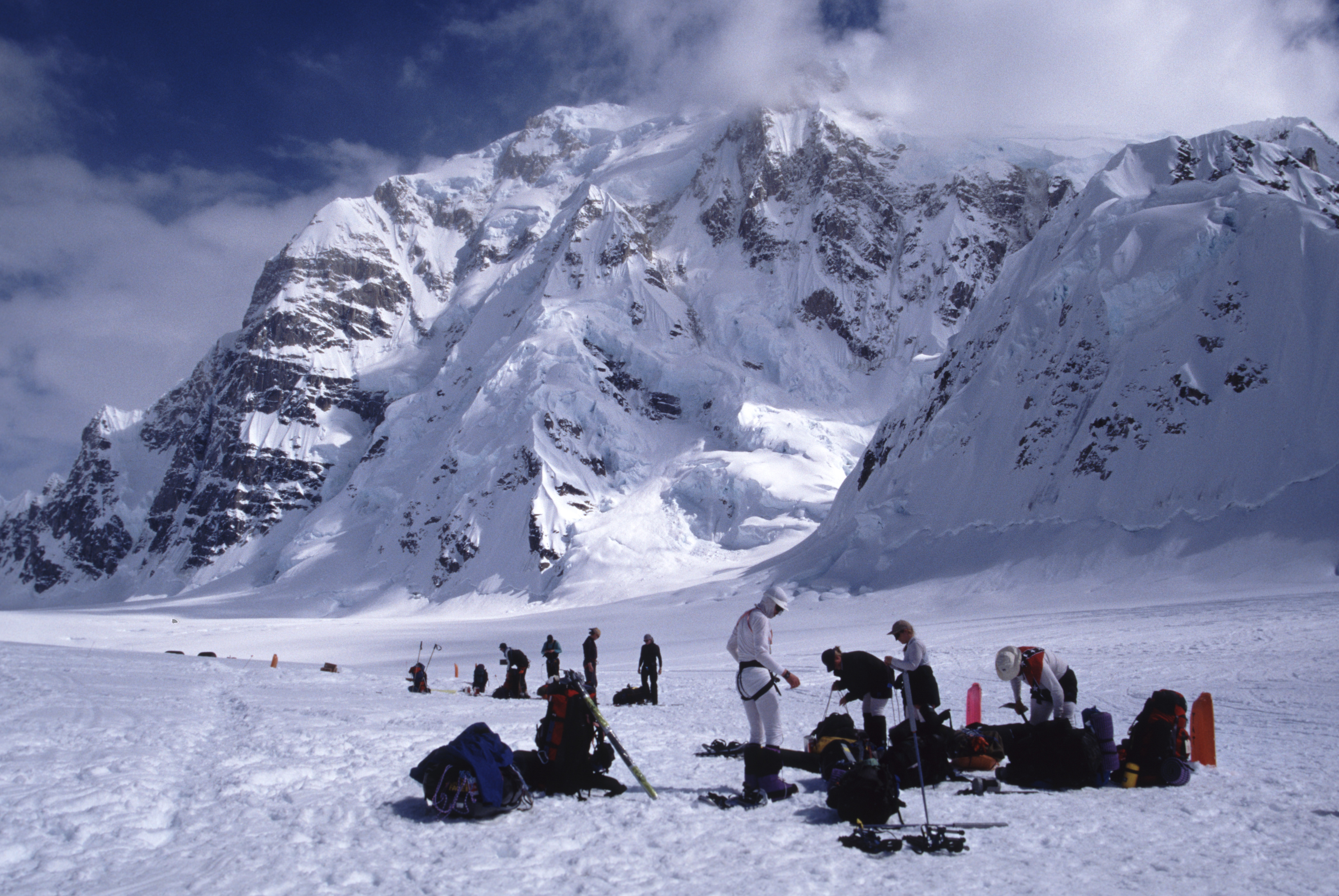
Mount Hunter from the northwest (Kahilta Base Camp)

Tejas became a mountain guide and mountain rescuer operating in the Andes, Himalayas, the Alaska Range, and Antarctica during the 1980s. In 1980, he was part of the team that summited Mount Hunter in the winter season for the first time. The team consisted of Gary Bocarde, Paul Denkewalter, Vernon Tejas. The ascent began on Kahiltna Glacier. Their climb was via the Northwest Spur. The Northwest Spur is also known as the Lowe-Kennedy Route, after Michael Kennedy and George Lowe made the ascent with this route in 1977. The team took their supplies to the base of Triangle Face, which was located a few thousand feet above their base camp and established an advanced camp. They climbed the Triangle Face and headed for Mushroom Ridge. Next the team climbed and reached the summit of Mount Hunter.

In the autumn of 1982, Tejas broke his ankle while rock climbing in Yosemite. The doctors had to wait a week for the swelling to subside before setting the fracture with a cast. The stress the ankle was subjected to over the years took its toll. The pursuits of a mountaineer and a high altitude alpine mountain guide had destroyed the cartilage in between the subtalar joint. In 2010, S. Robert Rozbruch, M.D. of the Hospital for Special Surgery in New York City utilized the Ilizarov technique and injected stem cells into the fixated subtalar joint to stimulate the growth of cartilage. The procedure is known as ankle distraction.

In 1986, he led the first winter summiting of Mount Logan. Around this time he also made several summits of Aconcagua, two of which led to descents to the base camp via a mountain bike, and then a paraglider, both of which he took to the peak himself along the climb. In 1988 he became the first person to paraglide from the Vinson Massif in Antarctica, and later became the first man to solo ascend the mountain. He has also paraglided from the summit of Mount Elbrus.

In 1988, Tejas became the first person to successfully solo climb Denali (formerly named Mount McKinley) during the winter season. He had previously summited the peak several times as a mountain guide. During the climb, Tejas carried an aluminum ladder as a part of his safety equipment so as to prevent becoming stuck in a crevasse. In 2011, he recorded his fiftieth summit of Denali. He has also summited the northernmost peak in the world, Helvetia Tinde.

In 1989, he began guiding for Alpine Ascents International.

In 1992, Tejas was part of the team that measured the exact height of Mount Everest, and was the team member that planted the prism pole at the top of the mountain so that lasers could be used to measure the exact altitude. On 12 May 1992, Tejas, Todd Burleson and Peter Athans placed laser prisms from Bradford Washburn on the summit of Mount Everest as part of a study to determine the height.

In 1994, Tejas helped guide Norman D. Vaughan up his namesake Antarctic mountain Mount Vaughan (named for his aid of Richard Byrd in Byrd's 1928 Antarctic expedition) in the days leading up to Norman Vaughan's 89th birthday.

In 2010, Tejas set the world record for the fastest period in which a person has climbed all seven of the world's highest mountain summits, at 134 days. He is also the only person to have summited all seven on at least ten separate occasions, and has climbed all seven twice within a year. He had previously held the record in 2005 at 187 days. During the period of the new record, he also scaled Puncak Jaya (also known as Carstensz Pyramid) in Indonesia on the island of New Guinea.

== Significant ascents ==
- First person to climb Seven Summits 10 times. On 12 May 1992, Tejas was the youngest person (at the time) to ascend the Seven Summits.
- Mount Everest, 11 guided summit ascents.
- Denali, 54 guided ascents, 1st solo winter ascent, 1st paraglider descent, 14:50 speed ascent. During the Denali solo winter ascent, when Tejas reached the summit he planted a Japanese flag to commemorate the heroic efforts of Naomi Uemura. In 1984, Uemari had reached the summit attempting a solo winter ascent but disappeared on the descent and his body has never been found.
- Mount Elbrus, 34 guided ascents, 3:20 speed ascent from hut, and paraglide descent.
- Aconcagua, 25 guided ascents, 8:02 speed ascent, and paraglide descent.
- Carstensz Pyramid, 3 guided ascents via Jungle route.
- Mount Vinson, 36 guided ascents and personal ascent, 1st solo ascent, 10:20 speed ascent, 1st paraglide descent.
- Kilimanjaro, 15 guided ascents and 10:45 speed ascent.
- Mount Hunter, Alaska, first winter ascent.
- Mount Logan, first winter ascent.
- Mont Blanc, 3 guided ascents and personal ascent.
- Mount Rainier, 2 guided ascents.
- Cho Oyu, 1 guided ascent.
- He has also ascended Chimborazo, Matterhorn, Mount Kinabalu, and Cotopaxi.

=== Greenland and Helvetia Tinde ===
- Greenland, world's northernmost mountain.

In 2001, a nine-person team on the Return To The Top Of The World Expedition (RTOW2001) landed at Frigg Fjord. The group traversed the peninsula to the north, and made their way up the Syd Glacier, then crossed the Polkorridoren, and proceeded down the Nord Glacier. As the team crossed, five climbers: John Jancik, Joe Sears, Vernon Tejas, Ken Zerbst, and Steve Gardiner made the second ascent of Helvetia Tinde on 17 July 2001 via a new route up the east ridge. In 1969, the British Joint Services Expedition first climbed the 1920 meter summit of Helvetia Tinde. Helvetia Tinde is the highest peak in the most northerly mountain range on Earth, a mere 750 km from the geographic North Pole. On 18 July 2001, all nine team members: David Baker, Terri Baker, John Jancik, Jim McCrain, Jim Schaefer, Joe Sears, Vernon Tejas, Ken Zerbst, and Steve Gardiner made the first ascent of the highest as yet not climbed peak in the northern most mountain range on Earth. On reaching the north coast, the team recorded altitudes of summits, altitudes of saddles, and GPS readings for 14 peaks. On 23 July 2001, a team crossed the sea ice at Sands Fjord to make first ascents of several peaks on Cape Christian IV. On 25 July 2001, Sears, Tejas, and Gardiner climbed additional peaks in the area that included Peak 6. The whole team continued east along the coast to Cape Morris Jesup, and met up with their pilot and airplane to return to the United States. The team's data was submitted to the appropriate experts in Denmark and the United States. The results indicated that Peak 6, at 83°, 36.427' north, is the summit of the most northern mountain on Earth.

== Significant explorations ==
- First traverse of Wrangell-St. Elias Range in Alaska.
- Ski mountain guide for Shackleton Traverse, 2 times. In November 2012, the Shackleton Crossing Team consisted of Laurie Goldsmith and Richard Goldsmith, husband and wife retirees from the United States, Anja Schikarski, a speech and language pathologist from Ulm, Germany; Harald Helleport, a postal worker from Vienna, Austria; Scott Anderson, a veterinary surgeon from Pacific Palisades, California; Joel Robinson, a retired engineer from La Canada Flintridge, California; Franz Schondorfer from Germany; Carole Tejas and Vern Tejas, a husband and wife team from the United States; Rick Sweitzer from the United States; and Paul Schurke from the United States. Guides for the team were Vern Tejas, Rick Sweitzer, and Paul Schurke.
- Ski guide, Last Degree to South Pole, 2 times
- Ski guide, Last Degree to North Pole. In April 2012, Tejas was a ski guide for the North Pole Last Degree Ski Expedition. The team consisted of Michael Stringfellow, a radiologist from Central Coast, Australia; Simon Hearn, an executive recruiter from London, England; Alex Hearn, son of Simon; Lien Choong Luen from Singapore; Jianhong Li from China; Xiaohua Lu from China; John Dahlem from the United States; Vern Tejas from the United States; Keith Heger from the United States; and Rick Sweitzer from the United States.
- Scout, Overland Traverse to South Pole
- Kayak guide for Greece, Santorini, and Crete

=== Moon-Regan TransAntarctic Expedition ===
- First wheeled crossing of Antarctica. The Moon Regan TransAntarctic Expedition was a 10-man team headed up by Andrew Regan and Andrew Moon. In November 2010, the expedition traveled from the west coast of Antarctica at Patriot Hills to the South Pole (retracing the steps of the famous Vivian Fuchs and Edmund Hillary Commonwealth Trans-Antarctic Expedition), and then north to McMurdo Sound across the Transantarctic Mountains. Members of the team were: Andrew Regan, British entrepreneur and businessman; Andrew Moon, lawyer and competent sailor from the Cayman Islands; Paul Sciefersten, cross-country skier with first aid skills; Vernon Tejas, mountain guide; Jamie Bligh, downhill skier, lead communicator for the expedition; George Pagliero, cameraman and documentary writer; Pete Ash, expedition mechanic; Gunnar Egilsson, expert snow and ice terrain driver; Astvaldur Gudmundsson, Air Ground Rescue, Iceland member and experienced snow and ice driver; and Ray Thompson, Institute of Biomedical Engineering, Imperial College London, research associate. The expedition utilized three vehicles: the Winston Wong Bio-Inspired Ice Vehicle (BIV) and two six-wheel drive Science Support Vehicles (SSVs) which acted as mobile laboratories.

== Awards and recognition ==
- Fastest time to climb the Seven Summits including Carstensz (male). Vernon Tejas. Mount McKinley. United States. 31 May 2010. Following is the award citation:

Vernon Tejas (USA) set a new speed record of the Seven Summits following the combined Kosciuszko and Carstensz lists of summits. Tejas began his record attempt with Vinson Massif on 18 January 2010 and after ascents on Aconcagua, Carstensz Pyramid, Kosciuszko, Kilimanjaro, Elbrus and Everest, reached the top of the last summit, Mt. McKinley on 31 May 2010.

This record is for 133 days and for this Tejas was given a Guinness World Record.

- Explorers Grand Slam
- American Alpine Club, Lifetime member.
- Alaska Sports Hall of Fame, Moment, 2017. Vern Tejas' 1988 solo winter ascent of Denali.
- Alaska Sports Hall of Fame, Member, 2012. Vern Tejas' Solo Winter Ascent of Mount McKinley in 1988.
- Alaskan of the Year Award, Governor's Award, 2012.
- National Park Service, Denali Pro Pin for Rescue. In 1986, Vern Tejas and Wolfgang Wippler, along with the National Park Service, and Environmental Protection Agency helicopters, rescued Korean climbers on Denali. The climbers were suffering from high altitude cerebral edema and were retrieved by dragging the climbers off the mountain and rescued via helicopter evacuation at a cost to the government of $23,141.
- Sports Illustrated, Top 50 Athletes From Alaska, 2000.
- Eco-Challenge, finisher, 10th in 1999 and 13th place in 2001.
- United States Hang Gliding and Paragliding Association, 15 year member.
- In 1988, Tejas successfully completed the first parapente or paraglider descent of Vinson Massif.

== Certifications ==
- Wilderness First Responder / CPR, 8 times.
- Alaska Mountain Rescue, 20 year member.
- American Institute for Avalanche Research and Education (AIARE), Level 1 Avalanche Course.

== Scientific contributions ==
- On 12 May 1992, Tejas, Todd Burleson and Peter Athans placed laser prisms from Bradford Washburn on the summit of Mount Everest as part of a study to determine a more accurate height of the peak.
- Scientific study conducted in Nepal. Acknowledgement given to Vern Tejas, Todd Burleson, Gordon Janow, Willie Prittie, Jibhan Gimire and Bharat Karki from Alpine Ascents International.

== Endorsements and sponsors ==
- Martin Guitar.

== In popular media ==
- Host for Food Network's Tasting Alaska.
- Talent ESPN TV special Surviving Denali, 1994.
- Talent for National Geographic Ultimate Survival Alaska.

== Photograph credits ==
- Cover photo on Dangerous Steps. Vernon Tejas and the Solo Winter Ascent of Mount McKinley.
- Cover photo on You Want To Go Where?
- Alaska Magazine, "Cover Boy"
