= Cape Washington, Greenland =

Headland in North Greenland

Cape Washington Kap Washington
- Cape
- Map of part of Ellesmere Island and far Northern Greenland

- Coordinates: 83°31′N 38°0′W
- Location: Peary Land, Greenland
- Offshore water bodies: Lincoln Sea
- Elevation: 885 m (2,904 ft)

Cape Washington (Danish: Kap Washington) is a headland in North Greenland. Administratively it belongs to the Northeast Greenland National Park.

== Geography ==
Cape Washington is located 14.5 km (9.0 mi) east of Cape Kane, off the mouth of the Hunt Fjord at the northern end of the Roosevelt Land Peninsula. Benedict Fjord lies to the east of the cape with its mouth between Cape Washington and Cape Cannon. The Raven Glacier has its terminus on the western side, south of Cape Washington, in the area of the mouth of Hunt Fjord.

Together with Cape Cannon and Cape Christian IV, Cape Washington is one of the northernmost headlands of mainland Greenland, east of Cape Morris Jesup.

== See also ==
- Peary Land
