= A. Harmsworth Glacier =

Glacier in northern Greenland

- A. Harmsworth Gletscher
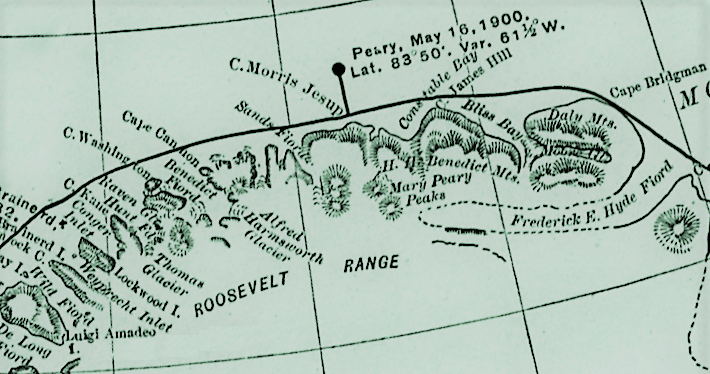
- Roosevelt Range section of Robert Peary's 1900 explorations map "Polar Regions"

- Location within Greenland
- Type: Valley glacier
- Location: Greenland
- Coordinates: 83°24′N 36°20′W
- Width: 3.5 km (2.2 mi)
- Terminus: Benedict Fjord; Lincoln Sea

A. Harmsworth Glacier or Alfred Harmsworth Glacier (Danish: A. Harmsworth Gletscher) is a glacier in northern Greenland. Administratively it belongs to the Northeast Greenland National Park.

The glacier was named by Robert Peary after British newspaper magnate Alfred Harmsworth, who had gifted him expedition ship "Windward" following a lecture on Polar exploration Peary gave at the Royal Geographical Society in 1897.

== Geography ==
The A. Harmsworth Glacier is flowing roughly to the NW and has its terminus at the head of the Benedict Fjord. It fills most of the inner fjord. Gertrud Rask Land lies on its eastern side and Roosevelt Land in the west. The glacier has a velocity of 160 m (520 ft) per year.

The peaks of the Roosevelt Range rise on both sides and at the head of the A. Harmsworth Glacier. To the east some peaks rise to heights above 1,500 m (4,900 ft). The A. Harmsworth Glacier is one of the large glaciers in the area.

Map of Northern Ellesmere Island and far Northern Greenland.

== See also ==
- List of glaciers in Greenland
- Peary Land
