= Cape Cannon =

Cape Cannon Kap Cannon
- Headland
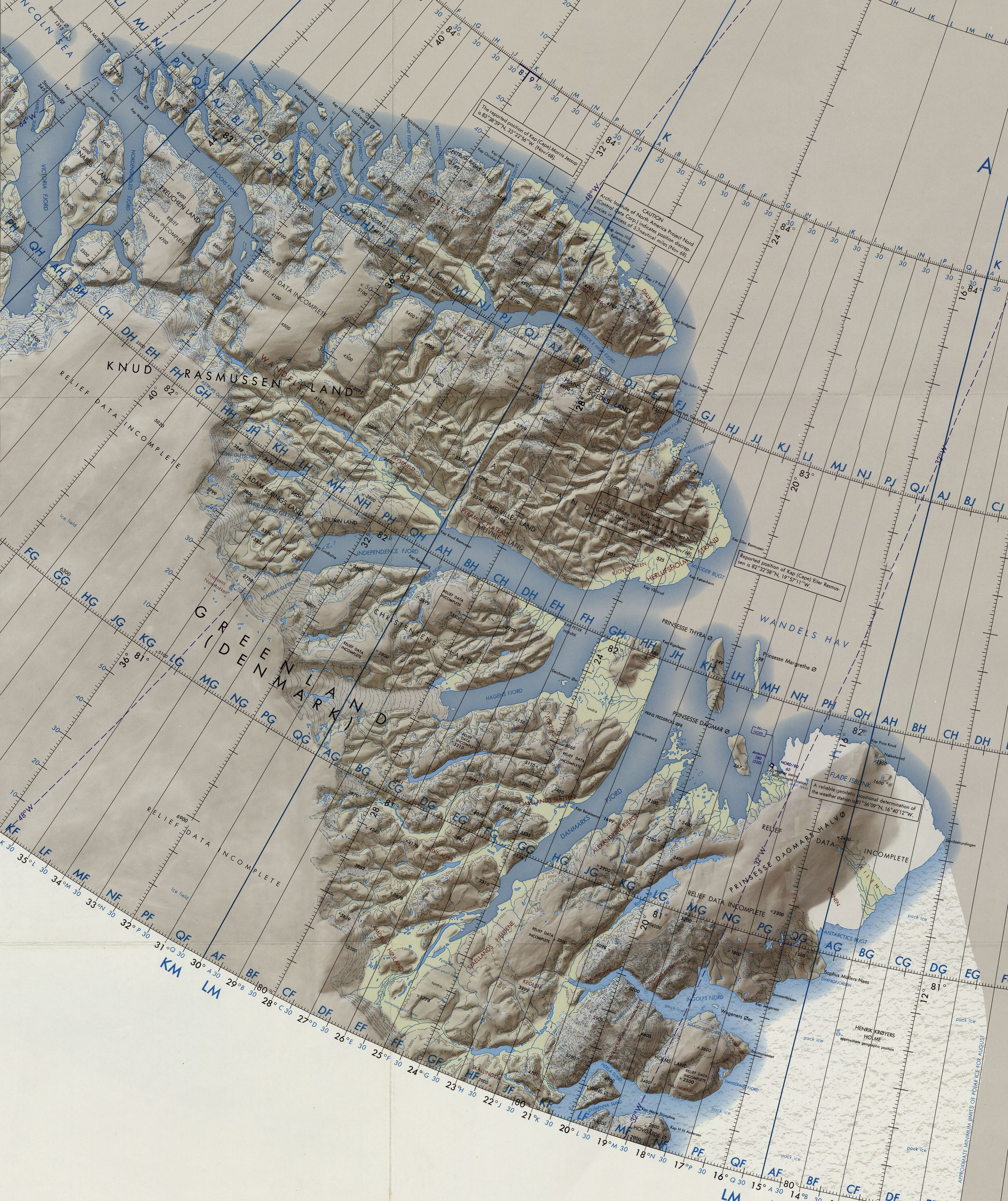
- Map of Greenland section.

- Coordinates: 83°31′N 36°54′W
- Location: Peary Land, Greenland
- Offshore water bodies: Lincoln Sea

Area
  - Total: Arctic

Cape Cannon (Danish: Kap Cannon) is a headland in the Lincoln Sea, Arctic Ocean, North Greenland. Administratively it is part of the Northeast Greenland National Park.

The cape was named by Robert Peary after Henry W. Cannon, one of the members of the Peary Arctic Club in New York.

== Geography ==
Cape Cannon is located at the northern end of Gertrud Rask Land, Peary Land. Benedict Fjord lies to the west of this headland with its mouth between Cape Cannon and Cape Washington.

The glacier discharging just east of the cape is the only one in the area that produces icebergs. About 10 km (6.2 mi) further to the east there is an unnamed fjord, with its mouth located west of Cape Christian IV
