= Polkorridoren =

Mountain pass in Peary Land, Greenland

- Nordpassagen
- Location within Greenland
- Elevation: 800 metres (2,600 ft)

Third Approach
- Location: Peary Land, Greenland
- Range: Roosevelt Range
- Coordinates: 83°22′11″N 34°21′29″W

Polkorridoren (meaning "Polar Corridor" in Danish), formerly known as Nordpassagen, is a mountain pass in Peary Land, Greenland. Administratively, it is part of the Northeast Greenland National Park.

In 1953, a geological expedition went through the Polkorridoren pass crossing the Roosevelt Range from south to north. The Polkorridoren Group is a geological formation named after the pass.

== Geography ==
The pass is located in the central / western sector of the Roosevelt Range, east of Gertrud Rask Land. It runs from north to south between the glacial valley of Sands Fjord to the north and the valley of Frigg Fjord to the south. Helvetia Tinde rises to the west.

== See also ==
- Nordpasset
- Sirius Passet
