= Thomas Glacier (Greenland) =

Glacier in northern Greenland

- Thomas Gletscher
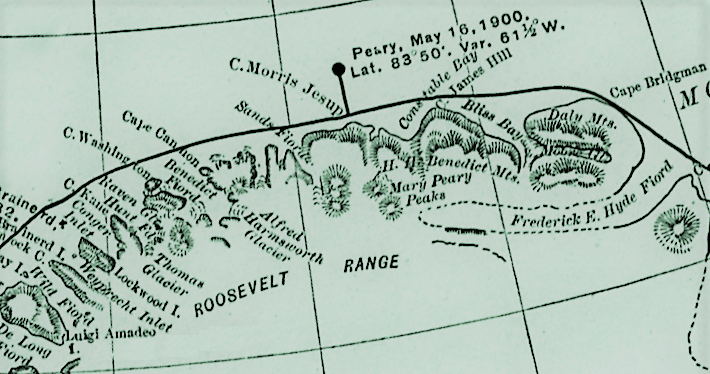
- Roosevelt Range section of Robert Peary's 1900 explorations map "Polar Regions".

- Location within Greenland
- Type: Valley glacier
- Location: Greenland
- Coordinates: 83°21′N 37°35′W
- Width: 3 km (1.9 mi)
- Terminus: Hunt Fjord; Lincoln Sea

Thomas Glacier (Danish: Thomas Gletscher) is a glacier in northern Greenland. Administratively it belongs to the Northeast Greenland National Park.

The glacier was named by Robert Peary after E. B. Thomas, one of the founding members of the Peary Arctic Club in New York.

== Geography ==
The Thomas Glacier is a large, slow-moving glacier in Roosevelt Land. It flows northwestwards with its terminus at the head of the Hunt Fjord.

The peaks of the Roosevelt Range close to the head of the Thomas Glacier rise to heights of nearly 1,500 m (4,900 ft). In the area of its terminus sharp-peaked, dark nunataks protrude above the ice.

Map of Northern Ellesmere Island and far Northern Greenland.

== See also ==
- List of glaciers in Greenland
- Peary Land
