= Benedict Fjord =

Fjord in Greenland

- Map of Northern Ellesmere Island and far Northern Greenland.

- Location in Greenland
- Location: Arctic
- Coordinates: 83°27′N 36°50′W
- Ocean/sea sources: Lincoln Sea
- Basin countries: Greenland
- Max. length: 22 km (14 mi)
- Max. width: 6 km (3.7 mi)
- Frozen: All year round
- Settlements: 0

Benedict Fjord is a fjord in Peary Land, northern Greenland. To the north, the fjord opens into the Lincoln Sea of the Arctic Ocean.

The fjord was named by Robert Peary in honor of New York banker and yachtsman E. C. Benedict, one of the prominent members of the Peary Arctic Club.

== Geography ==
Benedict Fjord is located east of Hunt Fjord with its mouth in the Lincoln sea between Cape Washington and Cape Cannon. It opens to the north about 30 km (19 mi) to the west of Sands Fjord. The fjord stretches in a roughly southeast–northwest direction for about 20 km (12 mi).

There are two branches at its head; A. Harmsworth Glacier discharges from the Roosevelt Range on the eastern side of the head of Benedict Fjord, and a smaller branch extends southwards from the western flank of the fjord. The fjord is limited by Gertrud Rask Land on its eastern side and Roosevelt Land in the west. Both shores of the fjord are largely glaciated.

== See also ==
- List of fjords of Greenland
