= Roosevelt Land =

Peninsula in Peary Land, Greenland

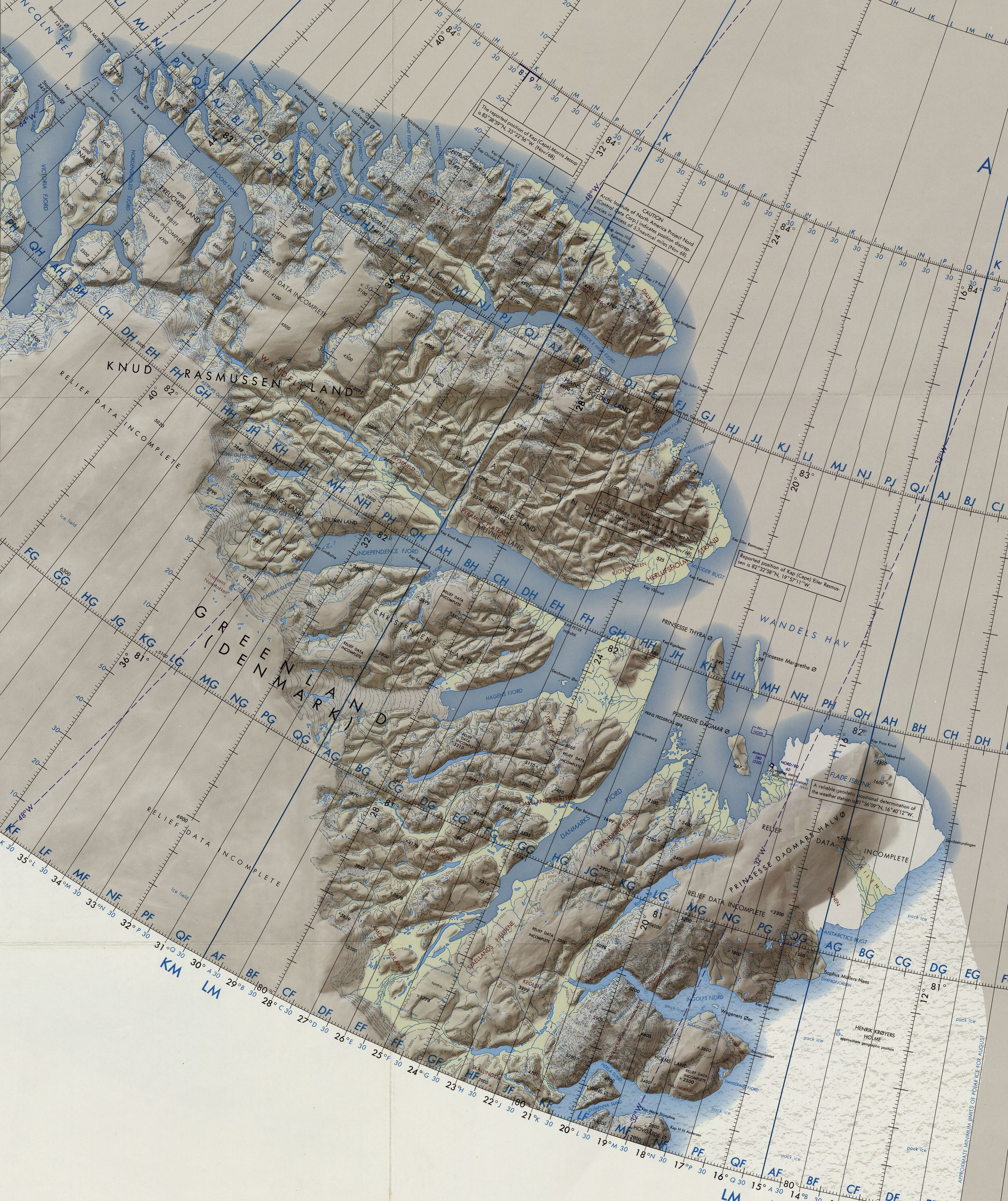
- Map of far Northern Greenland.

- Location within Greenland

Geography
- Location: Peary Land, Greenland
- Coordinates: 83°20′N 39°00′W
- Adjacent to: Conger Sound; Weyprecht Fjord; Harder Fjord; Lincoln Sea; Hunt Fjord; Benedict Fjord
- Length: 70 km (43 mi)
- Width: 50 km (31 mi)
- Highest elevation: 1,555 m (5102 ft)
- Highest point: Unnamed

Administration
- Greenland (Denmark)

Demographics
- Population: Uninhabited

Roosevelt Land (Danish: Roosevelts Land) is a peninsula in far northern Greenland. It is a part of the Northeast Greenland National Park.

The territory was named by Robert Peary after US President Theodore Roosevelt (1858 – 1919).

== Geography ==
Roosevelt Land is located in western Peary Land, to the north of Amundsen Land, separated from it by the Harder Fjord, To the west it is limited by the Conger Sound, and to the east by Gertrud Rask Land. The northernmost headland is Cape Washington and the westernmost Cape Kane, both on the Lincoln Sea shore. The peninsula is mountainous, deeply cut by glaciated areas. The Roosevelt Range runs across Roosevelt Land eastwards. The main glacier is the Thomas Glacier. The highest point is a 1,555 metres (5,102 ft) summit found in the southern zone of the central part of the peninsula.

American geologist William E. Davies called the long mountain system to the north of J.P. Koch Fjord and Frederick E. Hyde Fjord the "Nansen-Jensen Alps", with the westernmost foothills in neighboring Nansen Land, stretching past the De Long Fjord area across Roosevelt Land and the Roosevelt Range, and reaching all the way to Johannes V. Jensen Land in the east.

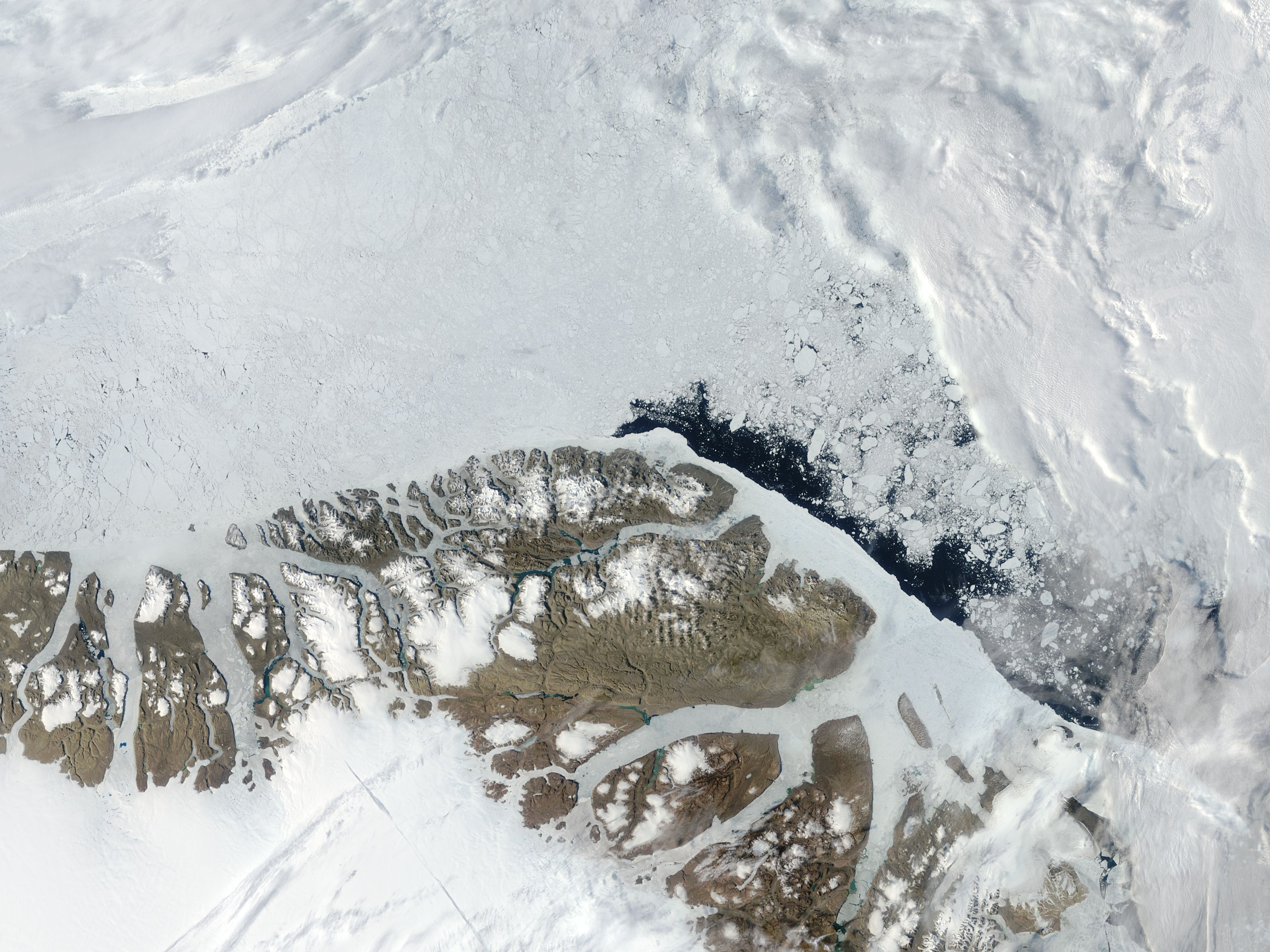
Satellite image of the northern end of Greenland.

== Bibliography ==
- H.P. Trettin (ed.), Geology of the Innuitian Orogen and Arctic Platform of Canada and Greenland. 1991

== See also ==
- Innuitian orogeny
