= Daly Range =

Mountain range in Greenland

- Daly Bjerge
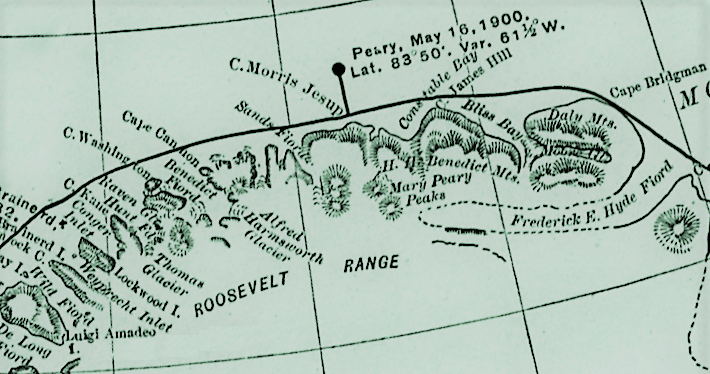
- Roosevelt Range section of Robert Peary's 1900 explorations map "Polar Regions"

Highest point
- Peak: Unnamed
- Elevation: 1,399 m (4,590 ft)
- Listing: List of mountain ranges of Greenland

Dimensions
- Length: 40 km (25 mi) NW/SE
- Width: 15 km (9.3 mi) NE/SW

Geography
- Location within Greenland
- Country: Greenland
- Region: Peary Land
- Range coordinates: 83°22′N 27°10′W
- Parent range: Roosevelt Range

Geology
- Rock age(s): Precambrian, Silurian

The Daly Range or Daly Mountains (Danish: Daly Bjerge) is a mountain range in Peary Land, Northern Greenland. Administratively this range is part of the Northeast Greenland National Park.

It forms the eastern end of the northernmost mountain range on Earth. The area of the range is barren and uninhabited.

== History ==
The mountain chain was named by Robert Peary after Judge Charles P. Daly, President of the American Geographical Society and member of the executive committee of the Peary Arctic Club in New York.

In 1900 Peary saw the range from the coast and was the first to put it on the map. The Daly Range was further surveyed in 1907 by Johan Peter Koch, Aage Bertelsen and Tobias Gabrielsen, the northern team of the ill-fated Denmark expedition, when they reached their northernmost point, Cape Bridgman. Aerial surveys by Lauge Koch in 1930 during the Three-year Expedition to East Greenland mapped the area with higher precision.

Still, the Daly Range remained very little explored until July 2000, when members of the American Alpine Club made an attempt to climb the highest point up the Bertelsen Glacier to the base of the peak. This attempt, however, was thwarted by awful weather conditions and the mountain remained unclimbed until July 2003 when four alpinists led by Dennis Schmitt were able to reach the highest point of the range from the Moore Glacier.

== Geography ==
The Daly Range is the easternmost subrange of the Roosevelt Range. Its highest peak rises above the confluence of the Moore Glacier and the Bertelsen Glacier. It is a prominent 1,399 m (4,590 ft) high summit covered by an ice cap —Schmitt gives a height of 1,456 m (4,777 ft) that contradicts the height on maps.

This mountain chain runs roughly from WNW to ESE at the eastern end of Johannes V. Jensen Land southeast of Bliss Bay in the Wandel Sea, SW of Cape Bridgman and north of the mouth area of Frederick E. Hyde Fjord, rising steeply above the coastal plain. The H. H. Benedict Range (H. H. Benedict Bjerge) rises to the west and southwest, beyond the Moore Glacier.

Map of Northern Ellesmere Island and far Northern Greenland.

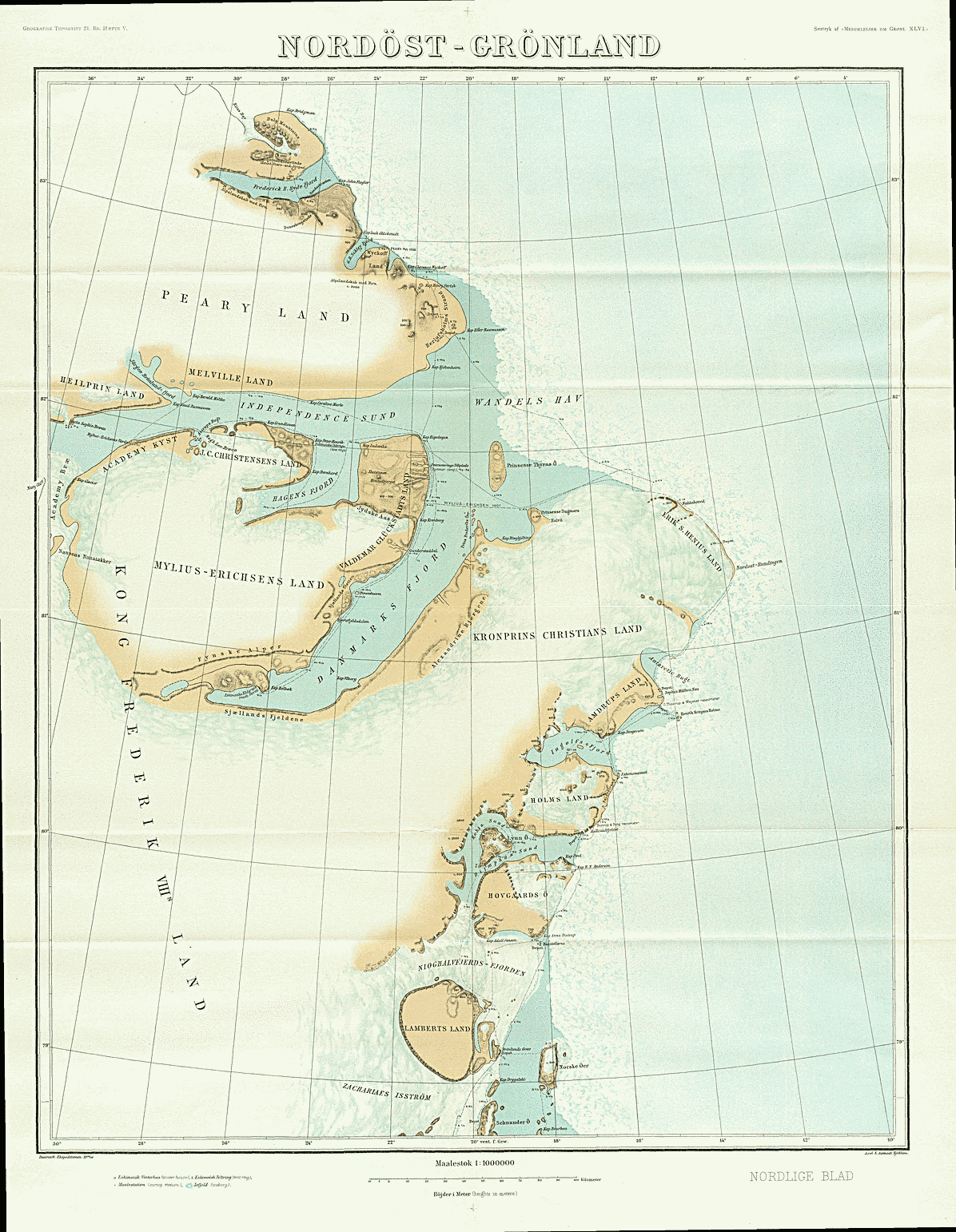
J. P. Koch 1911 map of NE Greenland showing at the top the Daly Range and the Bertelsen Glacier, the easternmost features of the Roosevelt Range.

== See also ==
- List of mountain ranges of Greenland
- Peary Land
