= Sif Glacier =

Glacier in northern Greenland

- Sif Gletscher
- Location within Greenland
- Type: Valley glacier
- Location: Greenland
- Coordinates: 83°22′N 31°0′W
- Width: 2.5 km (1.6 mi)
- Terminus: Tvillingesø
- Status: Retreating

Map of Northern Ellesmere Island and far Northern Greenland.

Sif Glacier (Danish: Sifs Gletscher), is a glacier in northern Greenland. Administratively it belongs to the Northeast Greenland National Park.

== History ==
The Sif Glacier was seen during aerial surveys by Lauge Koch and was named after Sif, the goddess representing Mother Earth in Norse mythology.

The glacier was first explored from the ground by the British Joint Services Expedition in 1969.

== Geography ==
The Sif Glacier is a slow-moving glacier located in Johannes V. Jensen Land, roughly in the middle of the Roosevelt Range. It flows in a WSW/ENE direction from the ice cap of the Mary Peary Peaks, bifurcating south of the Birgit Koch Peaks with one arm flowing roughly northwards and another southwards until their terminuses in the Northern and in the Southern Tvillingesø (Twin Lakes) respectively.

The northern branch of the Sif Glacier ends in a valley open to the north with its mouth in Constable Bay, where it formed prominent terminal moraines in the past.

== See also ==
- List of glaciers in Greenland
- Peary Land
