= Gertrud Rask Land =

Region in Peary Land peninsula, Greenland

- ONC map of Northern Ellesmere Island and far Northern Greenland.

- Location within Greenland

Geography
- Location: Peary Land, Greenland
- Coordinates: 83°31′N 36°47′W
- Adjacent to: Benedict Fjord; Lincoln Sea; Sands Fjord
- Length: 50 km (31 mi)
- Width: 40 km (25 mi)
- Highest elevation: 1,432 m (4698 ft)
- Highest point: Unnamed

Administration
- Greenland (Denmark)

Demographics
- Population: Uninhabited

Gertrud Rask Land (Danish: Gertrud Rasks Land) is an area in Peary Land, North Greenland. Administratively it is part of the Northeast Greenland National Park.

The territory was named by Lauge Koch after Gertrud Rask (1673 – 1735), the wife of missionary Hans Egede, during the 1921–1923 Bicentenary Jubilee Expedition surveys. Koch found no muskoxen in the area and deemed that it was too arduous for the animals to cross this barren, inhospitable expanse, so that they had to choose another route to reach the northeast coast of Peary Land in their migrations.

== Geography ==
Gertrud Rask Land is located in northern Peary Land, to the east of Roosevelt Land, separated from it by the A. Harmsworth Glacier. To the west it is limited by the Benedict Fjord, and to the east by the Sands Fjord and the Nord Glacier. Another large glacier descends directly into the sea in the central part. To the south rise the highest peaks of the Roosevelt Range, including Helvetia Tinde. To the north lies the frozen Lincoln Sea, where the northwesternmost headland is Cape Cannon, the northernmost one Cape Christian IV and the northeasternmost one Cape Hans Egede.

The terrain is harsh, mountainous and rugged, with numerous glaciated areas. The highest point of Gertrud Rask Land is a 1,432 metres (4,698 ft) summit located in the inner part. According to other sources the same peak is 1,411 metres (4,629 ft) high.

== Bibliography ==
- H.P. Trettin (ed.), Geology of the Innuitian Orogen and Arctic Platform of Canada and Greenland. 1991
- J. D. Friderichsen et al. Lithostratigraphic framework of the Upper Proterozoic and Lowe Paleozoic Deep Water Elastic Deposits of North Greenland 1982

== See also ==
- Cartographic expeditions to Greenland
- Innuitian orogeny
