= Bertelsen Glacier =

Glacier in northern Greenland

- Bertelsen Gletscher
- ONC map section of Northern Ellesmere Island and far Northern Greenland.

- Location within Greenland
- Type: Valley glacier
- Location: Greenland
- Coordinates: 83°35′N 27°25′W
- Width: 3 km (1.9 mi)
- Terminus: Moore Glacier; Bliss Bay; Wandel Sea

Bertelsen Glacier (Danish: Bertelsen Gletscher) is a glacier in northern Greenland. Administratively it belongs to the Northeast Greenland National Park. Between 2006 and 2010 there was an automatic weather station near the glacier.

The glacier was mapped with accuracy by Lauge Koch during an aerial survey in May 1938. It had previously not been seen by Robert Peary during his 1902 exploration of the area that put the adjacent Moore Glacier in the map. The glacier was named in honour of Aage Bertelsen, who had taken part in the 1906–1908 Danmark Expedition.

== Geography ==
The Bertelsen Glacier is one of the main glaciers in eastern Peary Land. It is a valley glacier, a branch of the larger, northwest-flowing Moore Glacier, joining it from the northeast. It is located in the area of the easternmost subranges of the Roosevelt Range, between the H. H. Benedict Range to the southwest and the Daly Range to the northeast.

== See also ==
- List of glaciers in Greenland
- Peary Land
