= Roosevelt Range =

Mountain range in Greenland

- Roosevelt Fjelde
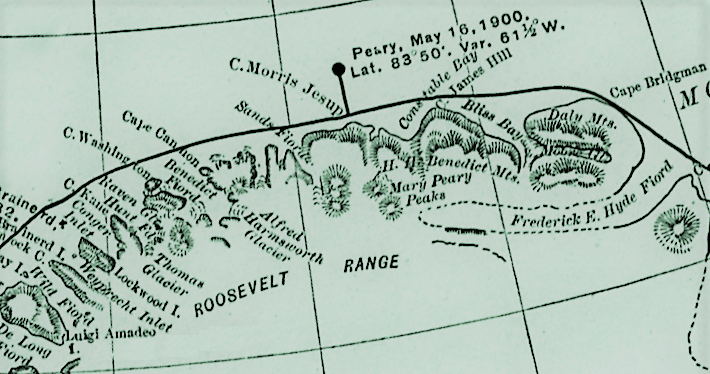
- Roosevelt Range section of Robert Peary's 1900 explorations map "Polar Regions"

Highest point
- Peak: Helvetia Tinde
- Elevation: 1,929 m (6,329 ft)

Dimensions
- Length: 150 km (93 mi) E/W
- Width: 60 km (37 mi) N/S

Geography
- Location within Greenland
- Country: Greenland
- Region: Peary Land
- Range coordinates: 83°20′N 35°0′W

Geology
- Orogeny: Innuitian orogeny
- Rock age: Precambrian to Late Palaeozoic
- Rock types: Sandstone, shale, mudstone and quartzite

The Roosevelt Range or Roosevelt Mountains (Danish: Roosevelt Fjelde) is a mountain range in Northern Greenland. Administratively this range is part of the Northeast Greenland National Park. Its highest peak is the highest point in Peary Land.

Located about 720 kilometres (450 mi) from the North Pole, the Roosevelt Range is the northernmost mountain range on Earth.

== History ==
The mountain chain was named by Robert Peary after U.S. President Theodore Roosevelt, who would become one of the main backers of Peary's 1905 Arctic expedition.

During the first half of the 20th century the range was quite unexplored, except for the mapping from the coast in 1907 of the Daly Range by Johan Peter Koch, Aage Bertelsen and Tobias Gabrielsen, the northern team of the ill-fated Denmark expedition, as well as aerial surveys and mapping begun by Lauge Koch in the 1920s.

In 1953 a geological expedition crossed the range through the Polkorridoren pass from Frigg Fjord to Sands Fjord.

The highest peak, Helvetia Tinde was first climbed in 1969 by the members of an expedition of the British Joint Services during a topographic and geological survey of the northern part of Peary Land. The second ascent of the summit was made in 1996. Later expeditions also went to the northern foothills of the range, not far from Cape Morris Jesup, and sought to identify and climb the "northernmost mountain on earth".

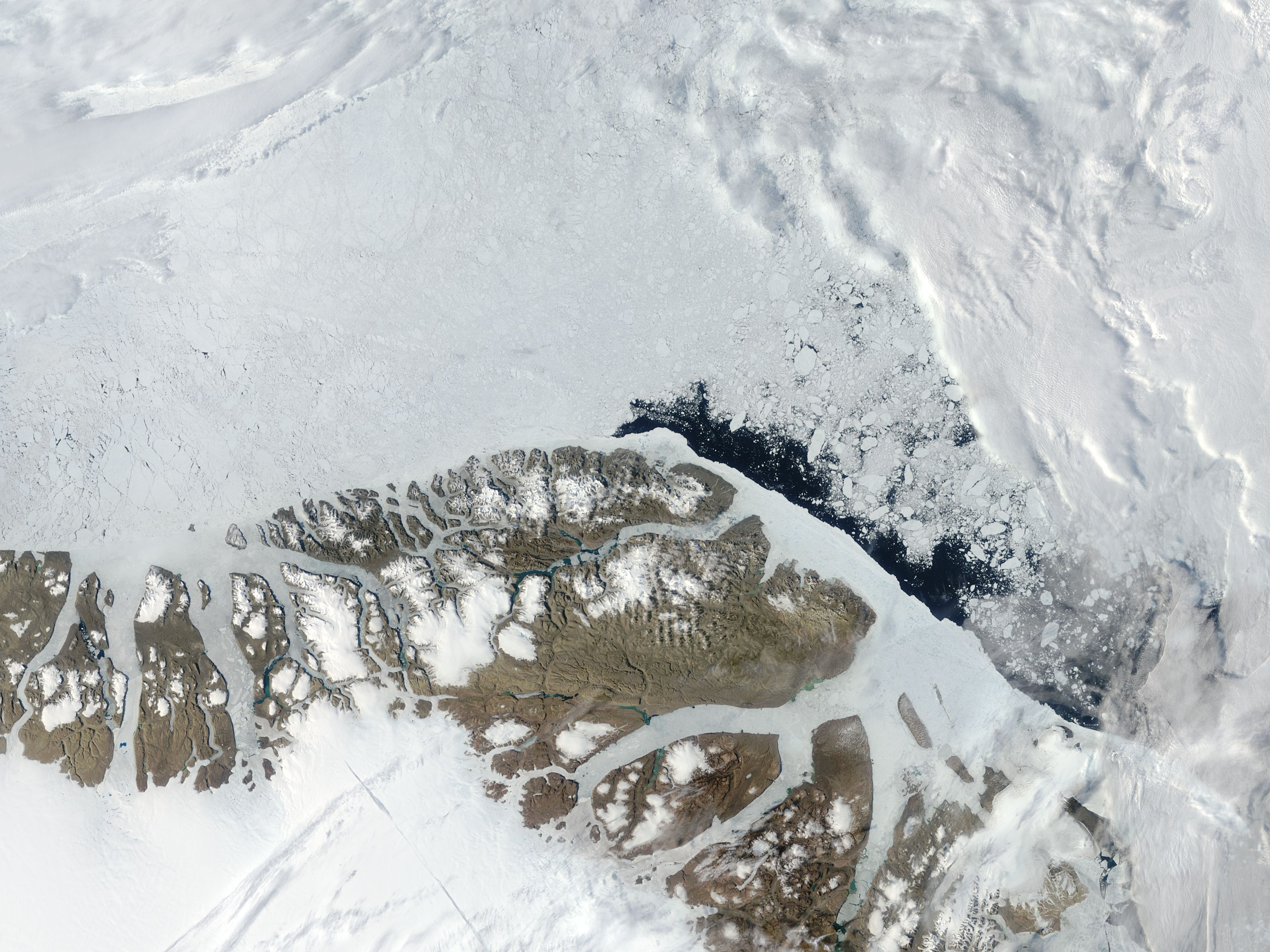
Satellite image of the northern end of Greenland

== Geography ==
The Roosevelt Range is an up to 1,929 m (6,329 ft) high mountain range in Northern Peary Land, formed by alpine-type mountains. The topography of the mountains is deeply eroded, with sharp, jagged ridges and precipitous cliffs. The area of the range is uninhabited.

Owing to a structural continuum in the mountains between Johannes V. Jensen Land in the east and Nansen Land in the west, American geologist William E. Davies called the wider range the "Nansen-Jensen Alps" in a work he published in 1972. The Roosevelt Range would be thus a subrange of a wider mountain chain with its westernmost foothills in Nansen Land, reaching all the way to Johannes V. Jensen Land in the east.

The Roosevelt Range proper rises in Roosevelt Land in the west and stretches eastward across Gertrud Rask Land, north of a valley between the heads of the Harder Fjord in the west and the Frigg Fjord in the east. It extends eastwards in Johannes V. Jensen Land north of the Frederick E. Hyde Fjord beyond the Polkorridoren (Polar Corridor), a mountain pass connecting two glacial valleys running from North to South between the heads of Sands Fjord to the north and Frigg Fjord to the south. Its easternmost subranges almost reach the eastern end of northern Peary Land. The area near the Lincoln Sea coast, southwest of Cape Morris Jesup is known as Ulvebakkerne (Wolf Hills).

=== Peaks ===
Apart from its highest point Helvetia Tinde, not many peaks of the Roosevelt Range have been named. Other relevant mountains in the range are Paradisfjeld and Mary Peary Peaks (Mary Peary Tinder), located east of the Polar Corridor in a roughly central position, as well as Birgit Koch Peaks (Birgit Koch Tinder) and Rink Mountain (Rink Bjerg), a little further to the east.

=== Subranges ===
The H. H. Benedict Range (H. H. Benedict Bjerge), highest point Stjernebannertinde, and the Daly Range (Daly Bjerge), both located at the eastern end in Johannes V. Jensen Land, are subranges of the Roosevelt Range.

=== Glaciers ===
The valleys between mountains are filled with glaciers or icefields, none of which are very large. In the same manner as other features in this range many glaciers are unnamed.

- Thomas Glacier (Greenland)
- Raven Glacier
- A. Harmsworth Glacier
- Modvind Glacier
- Nord Glacier
- Syd Glacier
- Malcantone Glacier
- Nysne Glacier
- Sif Glacier
- Borup Glacier
- Moore Glacier
- Ydun Glacier
- Bertelsen Glacier

== Geology ==
The Roosevelt Range forms the northern sub-region of the Innuitian orogeny. It is part of the belt Caledonian folding that extends eastward from north Ellesmere Island. The ages of rocks in the range area are from Precambrian to Upper Silurian, with low-grade marbles, psammites, sandstone, shales, quartzite and mudstones.

Map of Northern Ellesmere Island and far Northern Greenland

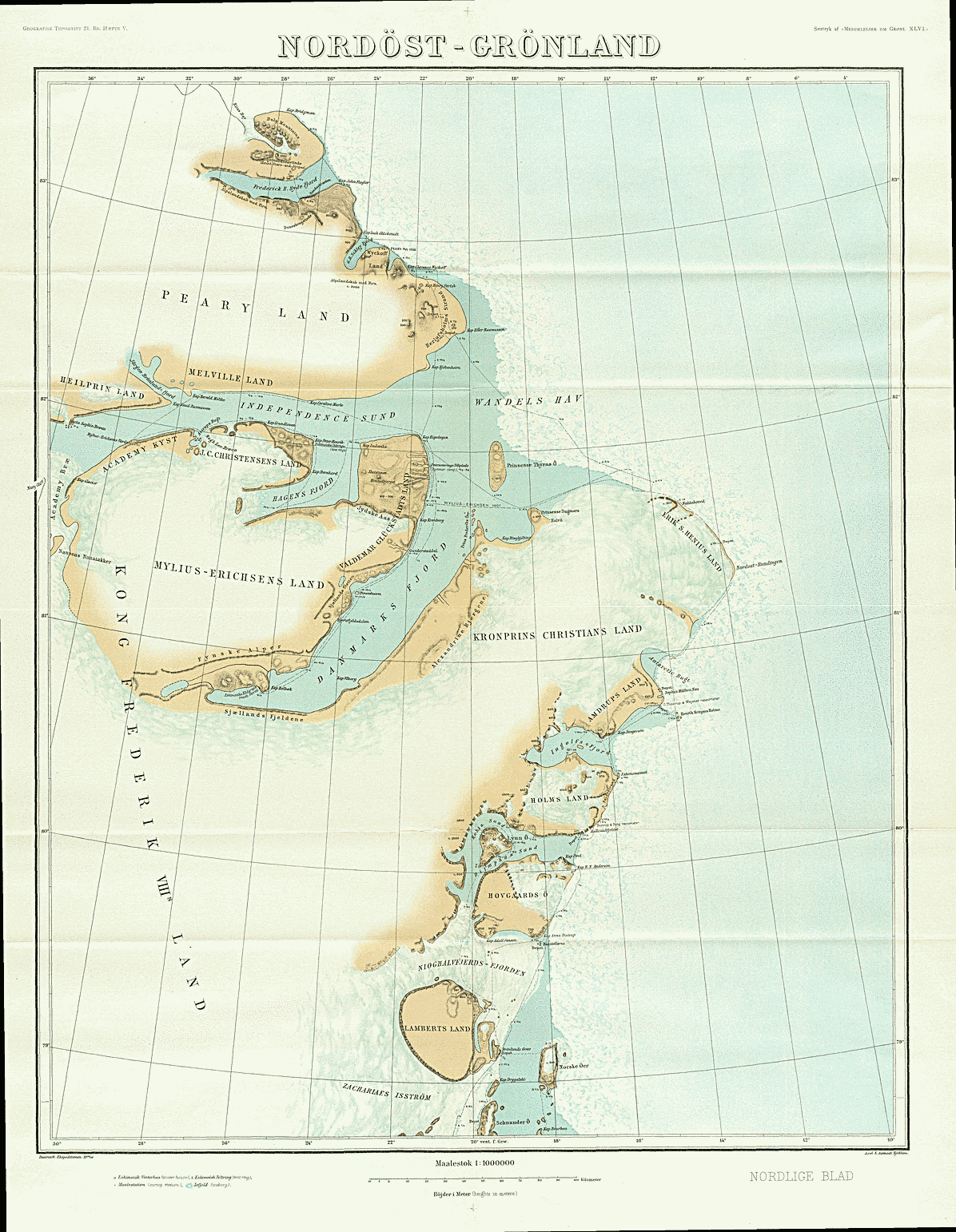
J. P. Koch 1911 map of NE Greenland showing at the top the Daly Range and the Bertelsen Glacier, the easternmost features of the Roosevelt Range

== Bibliography ==
- H.P. Trettin (ed.), Geology of the Innuitian Orogen and Arctic Platform of Canada and Greenland. 1991

== See also ==
- Extreme points of the Arctic
- List of mountain ranges of Greenland
- List of northernmost items
