= Stjernebannertinde =

Mountain in the Roosevelt Range, Greenland

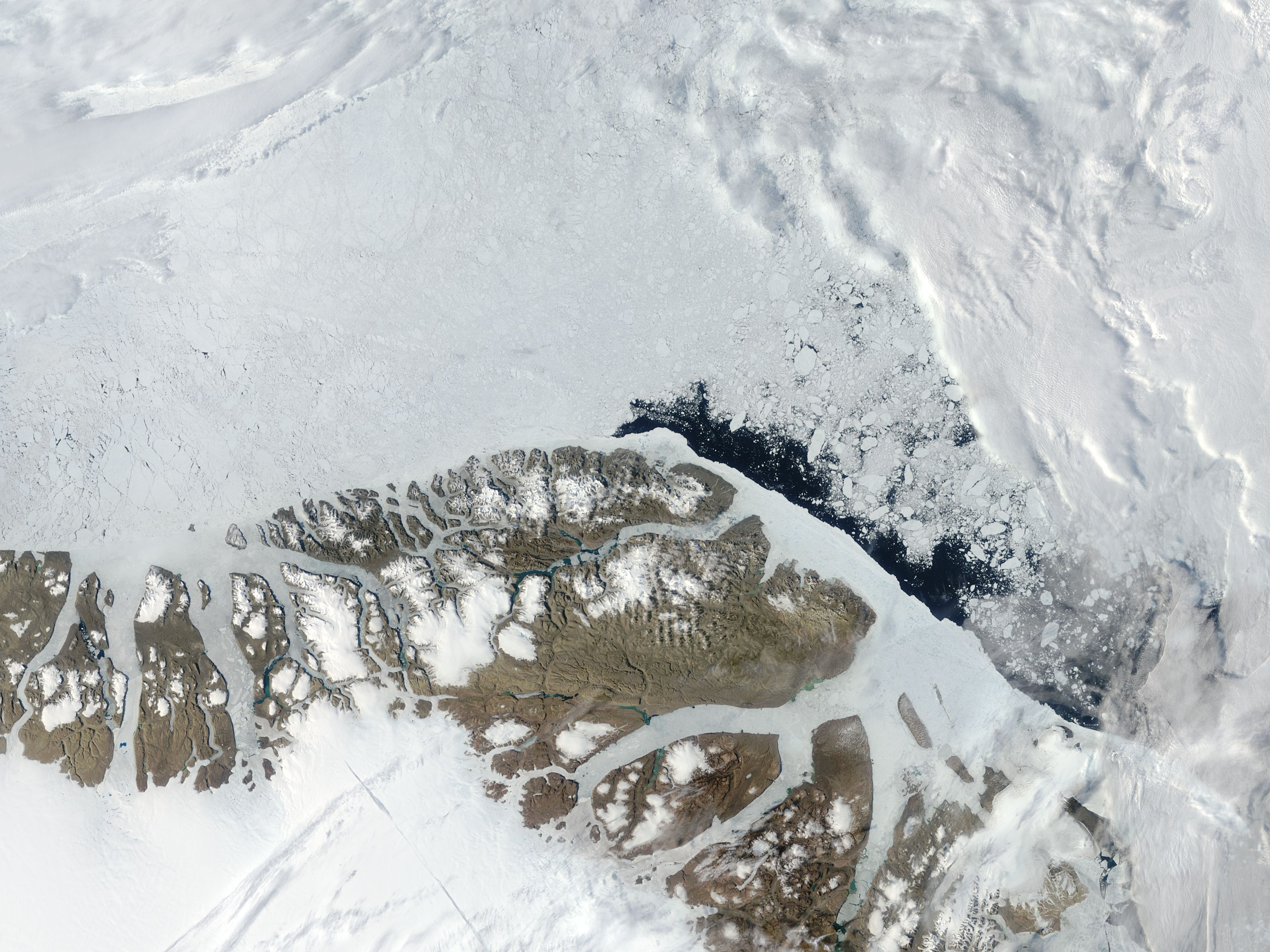
- Satellite image of the northern end of Greenland

Highest point
- Elevation: 1,424 m (4,672 ft)
- Prominence: 647 m (2,123 ft)
- Listing: List of mountains in Greenland
- Coordinates: 83°22′52″N 28°28′41″W

Geography
- Location within Greenland
- Location: Peary Land, Greenland
- Parent range: H. H. Benedict Range; Roosevelt Range

Climbing
- First ascent: 1996

Stjernebannertinde (Starry Banner Peak) is the highest mountain in the H. H. Benedict Range, a subrange of the Roosevelt Range, Northern Greenland.

The peak was first climbed in 1996 by the members of the American Top of the World Expedition (ATOW). It was one of the two main objectives of the expedition members in the northern part of Peary Land.

== Geography ==
Rising above the western flank of the Moore Glacier, the 1,424 m (4,672 ft) high Stjernebannertinde is the highest point of the H. H. Benedict Range, an eastern prolongation of the Roosevelt Range located in the eastern section of North Peary Land. The same mountain is marked as a 4,701-foot-high (1,433 m) peak in the A-5 sheet of the Defense Mapping Agency Navigation charts.

Administratively the Stjernebannertinde belongs to the Northeast Greenland National Park.

== See also ==
- List of mountains in Greenland
- ATOW1996
