= Mary Peary Peaks =

Mountain in the Roosevelt Range, Greenland

- Mary Peary Tinder
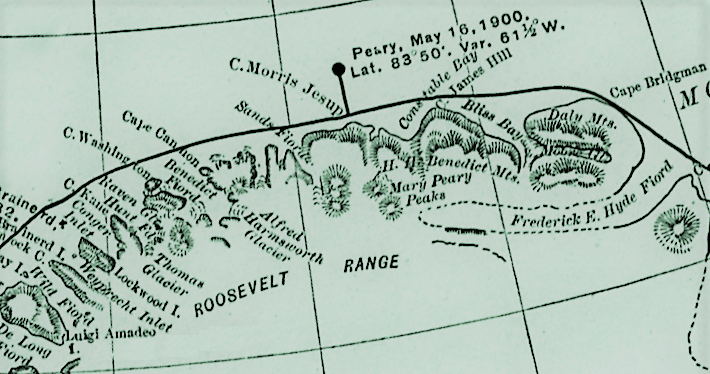
- Robert Peary's 1903 Northern Greenland map section

Highest point
- Elevation: 1,850 m (6,070 ft)
- Prominence: 503 m (1,650 ft)
- Listing: List of mountains in Greenland
- Coordinates: 83°25′18″N 32°59′37″W

Geography
- Location within Greenland
- Location: Peary Land, Greenland
- Parent range: Roosevelt Range

Climbing
- First ascent: No data

The Mary Peary Peaks (Danish: Mary Peary Tinder) are a mountain in the Roosevelt Range, Peary Land, Northern Greenland. Administratively they belong to the Northeast Greenland National Park.

The peaks were named by Robert Peary after his mother, Mary Peary (1827 – 1900). Peary saw the mountain from a distance, in the vicinity of Constable Bay, as he traveled along the shore. He marked it in his map but did not go inland to explore the features of the range.

== Geography ==
The Mary Peary Peaks are located in the middle sector of the Roosevelt Range east of the Polar Corridor in a roughly central position to the west of the western end of the H. H. Benedict Range. The maximum height is 1,850 metres (6,070 ft). According to the A-5 sheet of the Defense Mapping Agency Navigation chart it is a 6,200-foot-high (1,890 m) summit.

The Sif Glacier originates in the ice cap of the Mary Peary Peaks. It flows in a WSW/ENE direction bifurcating south of the Birgit Koch Peaks with one arm flowing roughly northwards and another southwards.

== See also ==
- List of mountains in Greenland
- Peary Land
