= Frigg Fjord =

Inlet in Greenland

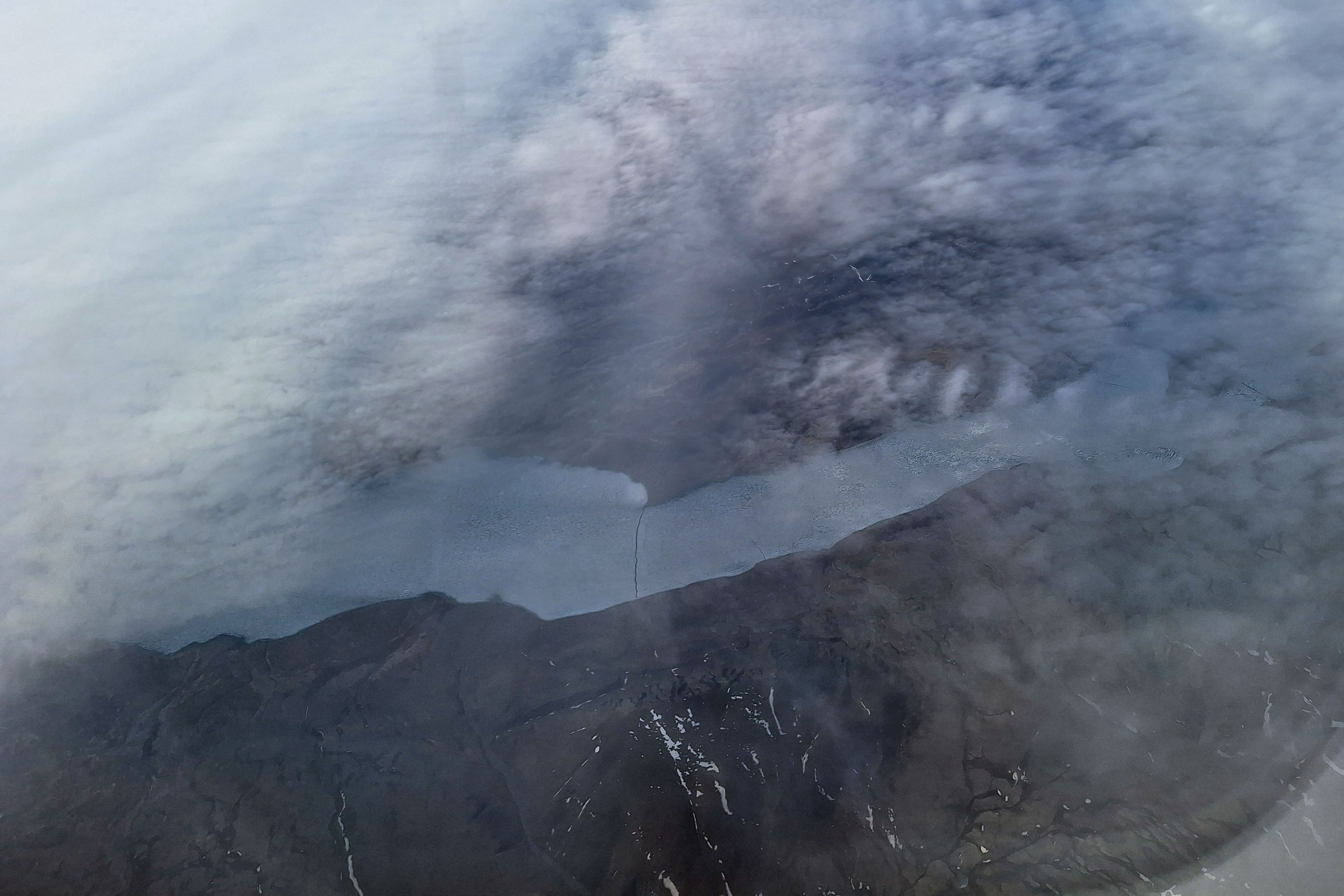
- Aerial photo in July 2026, looking southwest

- Location in Greenland
- Location: Arctic
- Coordinates: 83°7′N 33°0′W
- Ocean/sea sources: Frederick E. Hyde Fjord; Wandel Sea
- Basin countries: Greenland
- Max. length: 19 km (12 mi)
- Max. width: 7 km (4.3 mi)
- Settlements: None

Frigg Fjord (Danish: Friggs Fjord) is a fjord in Peary Land, far northern Greenland.

The archaeological remains in the northern shore and at the head of this fjord belong to the northernmost permanent settlements in human history. Further ruins slightly to the north at Cape Bridgman have been found, likely as a short-term expedition from the Frigg Fjord settlement.

== History ==
The area around the shores of Frigg Fjord was inhabited by the Independence I culture and later the Independence II culture until about 2,400 years ago. These inhabitants were people dependent on hunting muskoxen for survival and they lived a great part of the year in complete darkness. The ruins were found in the first half of the 20th century. The main sites are the Adam C. Knuth site, Qissivik and the Whale Terraces.

Since all other fjords in Northern Peary Land are frozen even in the summer, Frigg Fjord was identified as one of the few places where a seaplane can land in the northern part of Peary Land by the members of a 1953 geological expedition. After landing successfully with their plane in the unfrozen surface of the head of the fjord, they made a south–north crossing of the Roosevelt Range through the Polkorridoren pass to Sands Fjord.

== Geography ==
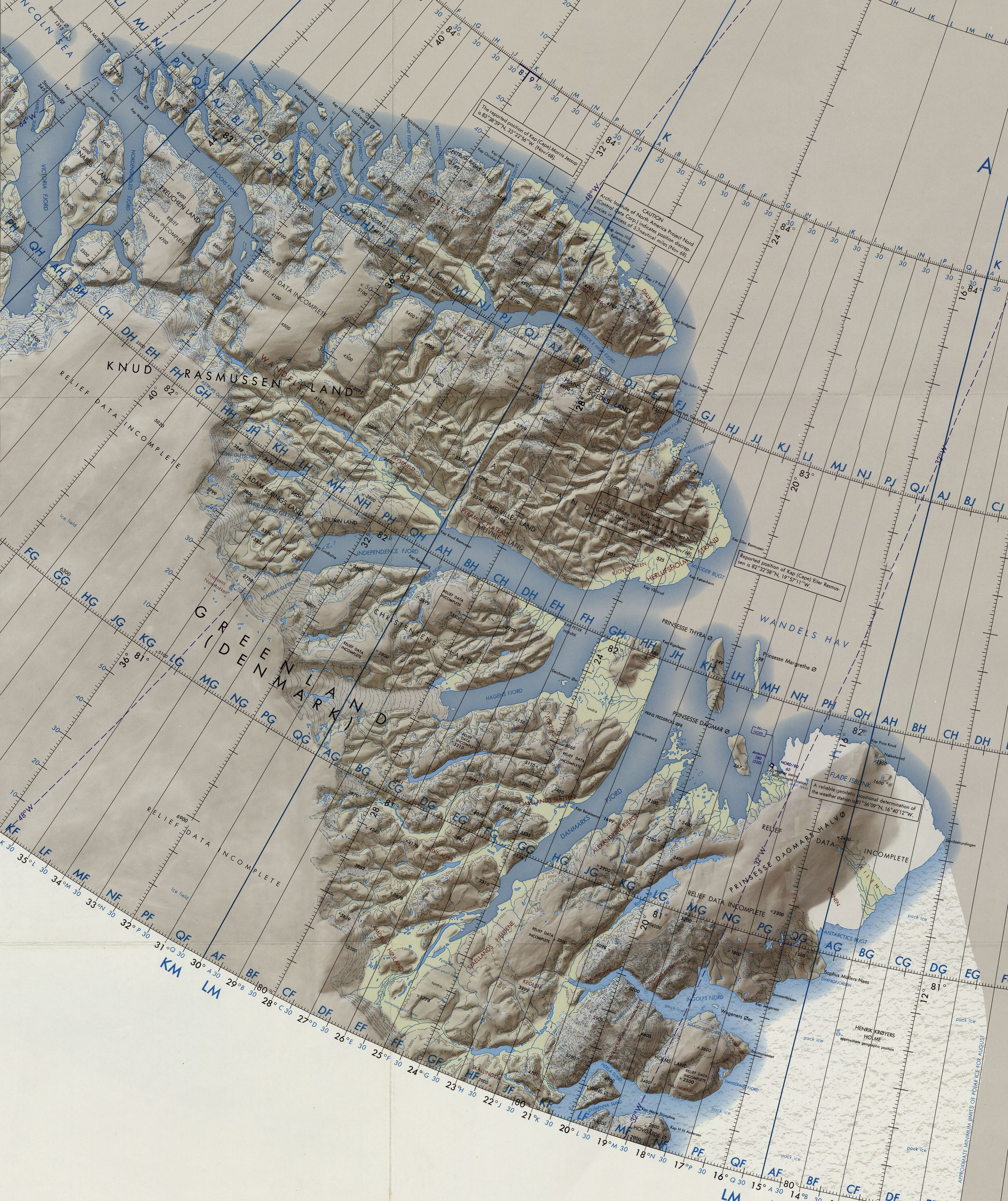
Map of Far Northeastern Greenland

Frigg Fjord is an offshoot on the northern shore of Frederick E. Hyde Fjord located 95 km (59 mi) from Cape John Flagler, at the fjord entrance. The fjord is roughly oriented in a NW/SE direction. There are two small islands near the head and there is no glacier discharging in the fjord. Freja Fjord has its mouth in the opposite side of Frederick E. Hyde Fjord.

Unusual for the latitude, the head area of Frigg Fjord is not frozen in the summer. When Lauge Koch saw a sector of this area from the air in 1938, he named it Drivhuset, meaning greenhouse, because he thought it was covered with vegetation, but it turned out to be an extensive, barren delta terrain.

== Bibliography ==
- Bjarne Grønnow; Jens Fog Jensen. The Northernmost Ruins of the Globe. Man and Society. Vol. 29. ISBN 87-90369-65-3.
- H.P. Trettin (ed.), Geology of the Innuitian Orogen and Arctic Platform of Canada and Greenland. Geological Survey of Canada (1991) ISBN 978-0660131313

== See also ==
- List of fjords of Greenland
- Northernmost settlements
