= Sands Fjord =

Fjord in northern Greenland

- Map of Northern Ellesmere Island and far Northern Greenland.

- Location in Greenland
- Location: Arctic
- Coordinates: 83°32′N 34°37′W
- Ocean/sea sources: Lincoln Sea
- Basin countries: Greenland
- Max. length: 12 km (7.5 mi)
- Max. width: 2 km (1.2 mi)
- Frozen: All year round
- Settlements: 0

Sands Fjord is a fjord in Peary Land, northern Greenland. To the north, the fjord opens into the Lincoln Sea of the Arctic Ocean. Administratively, it belongs to the Northeast Greenland National Park.

The fjord was named by Robert Peary in honor of H. Hayden Sands, one of his sponsors and a member of the Peary Arctic Club.

== Geography ==
Sands Fjord opens to the north about 20 km (12 mi) to the WSW of Cape Morris Jesup and about 30 km (19 mi) to the east of Benedict Fjord. The fjord is limited by Gertrud Rask Land on its western side. It stretches in a roughly south–north direction for about 12 km (7.5 mi) with its mouth opening to the Lincoln sea.

Cape Hans Egede is the headland on the western side of the mouth of Sands Fjord. The fjord is flanked by mountains on both sides, reaching a height of 800 m (2,600 ft). The MacMillan Glacier discharges at its head. Helvetia Tinde, the highest mountain of the Roosevelt Range, rises about 15 km (9.3 mi) SSW of the head of the fjord.

== See also ==
- List of fjords of Greenland
- Peary Land
