= Cape Morris Jesup =

Headland in northern Greenland

Cape Morris Jesup Kap Morris Jesup
- Cape
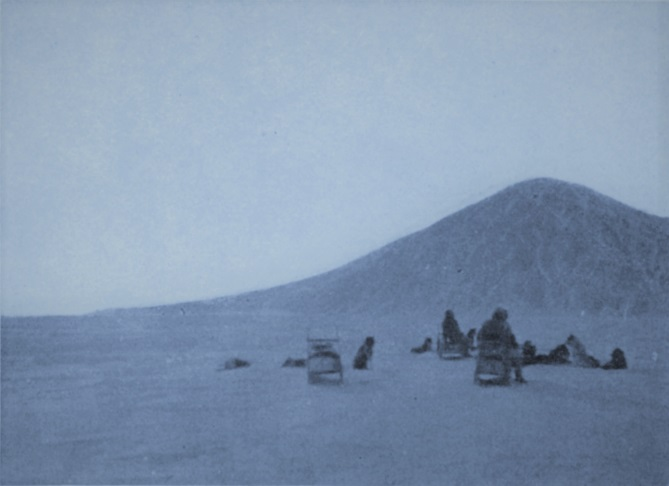
- View of Cape Morris Jesup on May 16, 1900

- Coordinates: 83°39′42″N 33°24′37″W
- Location: Peary Land, Greenland
- Offshore water bodies: Arctic Ocean

Area
  - Total: Arctic

Cape Morris Jesup (Danish: Kap Morris Jesup) is a headland in Peary Land, Greenland.

== Geography ==
Cape Morris Jesup is the northernmost point of mainland Greenland, the northernmost point of any mainland, and the northernmost land point on Earth except for the small island of Kaffeklubben (and perhaps some other formations which may be islands or may just be temporary gravel banks).

The cape is 712 kilometres (442 mi) from the geographic North Pole. It is located in Johannes V. Jensen Land, about 20 km (12 mi) east of the mouth of Sands Fjord and west of Constable Bay. The cape marks the limit between the Lincoln Sea to the west and the Wandel Sea to the east. About 5 km (3.1 mi) southeast of the cape there is a river forming a small delta that flows from the Mary Peary Peaks, part of the Roosevelt Range to the south.

=== Climate ===
Climate data for Cape Morris Jesup, Greenland (2010-2020)
Month	Jan	Feb	Mar	Apr	May	Jun	Jul	Aug	Sep	Oct	Nov	Dec	Year
Record high °C (°F)	3.4 (38.1)	7.8 (46.0)	0.1 (32.2)	1.4 (34.5)	7.4 (45.3)	9.5 (49.1)	15.3 (59.5)	17.0 (62.6)	4.5 (40.1)	5.6 (42.1)	4.1 (39.4)	2.6 (36.7)	17.0 (62.6)
Mean daily maximum °C (°F)	−25.0 (−13.0)	−24.6 (−12.3)	−26.1 (−15.0)	−18.8 (−1.8)	−7.6 (18.3)	1.8 (35.2)	4.0 (39.2)	2.3 (36.1)	−5.6 (21.9)	−13.9 (7.0)	−19.9 (−3.8)	−23.1 (−9.6)	−13.0 (8.6)
Daily mean °C (°F)	−28.4 (−19.1)	−27.8 (−18.0)	−28.8 (−19.8)	−21.5 (−6.7)	−9.4 (15.1)	0.2 (32.4)	2.2 (36.0)	0.5 (32.9)	−7.8 (18.0)	−16.8 (1.8)	−23.1 (−9.6)	−26.2 (−15.2)	−15.6 (3.9)
Mean daily minimum °C (°F)	−31.5 (−24.7)	−31.0 (−23.8)	−31.7 (−25.1)	−24.4 (−11.9)	−11.4 (11.5)	−1.2 (29.8)	0.8 (33.4)	−1.1 (30.0)	−10.3 (13.5)	−19.8 (−3.6)	−26.3 (−15.3)	−29.0 (−20.2)	−18.1 (−0.6)
Record low °C (°F)	−43.3 (−45.9)	−44.2 (−47.6)	−44.3 (−47.7)	−36.5 (−33.7)	−21.1 (−6.0)	−7.3 (18.9)	−2.8 (27.0)	−18.4 (−1.1)	−24.4 (−11.9)	−34.5 (−30.1)	−43.7 (−46.7)	−39.2 (−38.6)	−44.3 (−47.7)
Average relative humidity (%)	68.5	69.1	68.0	71.6	80.5	86.9	88.7	88.9	84.3	77.9	72.7	70.8	77.3
Source: DMI

== History ==
Robert Peary reached the cape on 13 May 1900, believing it to be the northernmost point of land in the world, although it was later found to lie slightly to the south of the northernmost tip of Kaffeklubben Island. The cape is named after American philanthropist Morris Ketchum Jesup, president of the Peary Arctic Club, who helped finance Peary's expeditions.

== Plants ==
Specimens of Arctic poppy and purple saxifrage have been found growing in the thin, rocky soil. Cape Morris Jesup is practically a polar desert with roughly 30-day summers. Despite these extremely inhospitable conditions, these two tiny flowering plants eke out a meager existence and persist blooming through summer lows near freezing temperatures.

== See also ==
- List of northernmost items
- Northernmost point of land
