= Cape Bridgman =

Headland in northeast Greenland

Cape Bridgman Kap Bridgman
- Headland
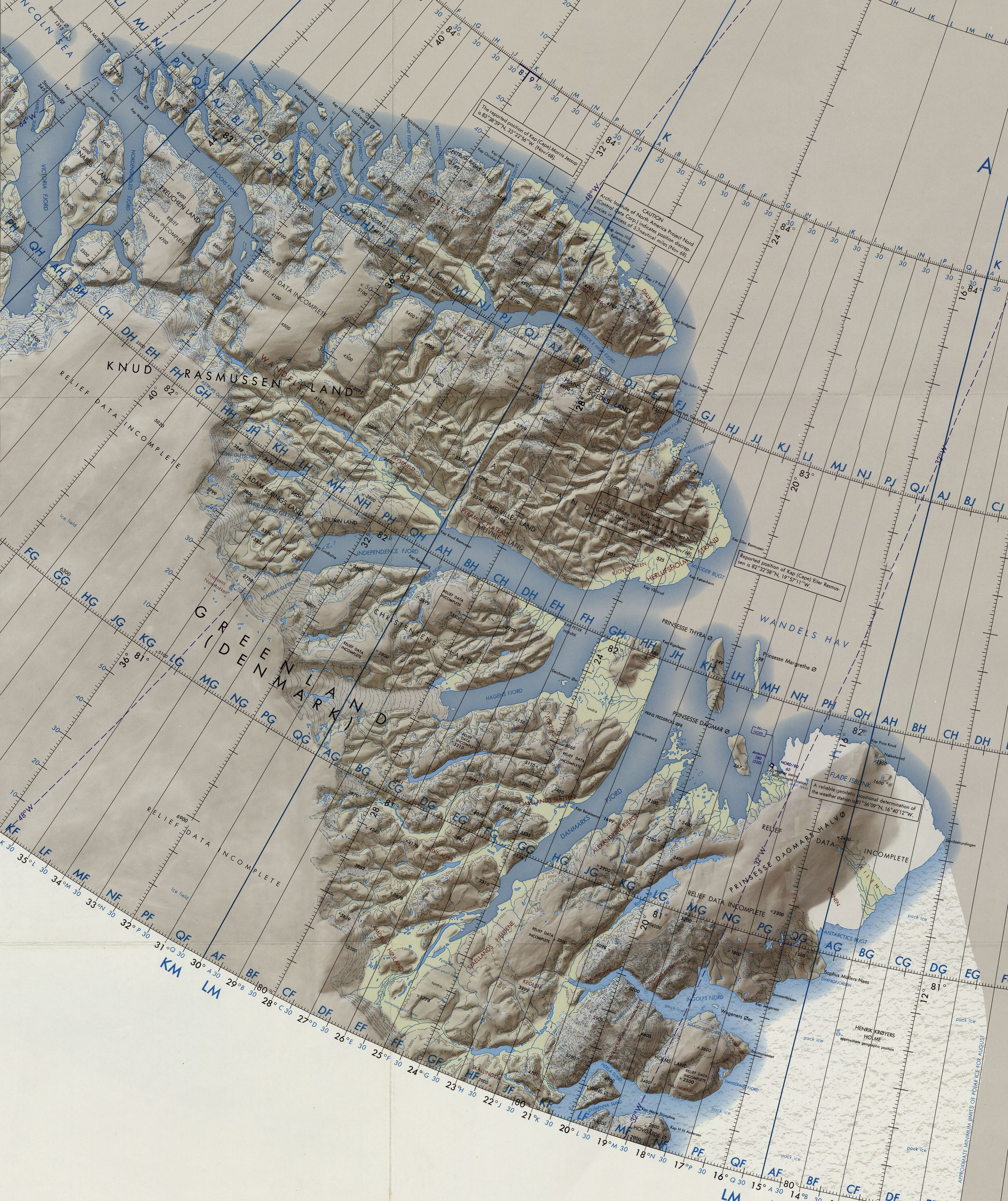
- Map of Greenland section.

- Location within Greenland
- Coordinates: 83°25′N 26°42′W
- Location: Northeast Greenland National Park, Greenland
- Water bodies: Wandel Sea, Arctic Ocean

Area
  - Total: Arctic

Cape Bridgman (Danish: Kap Bridgman) is a headland in the Wandel Sea, Arctic Ocean, northeast Greenland.

The cape was named by Robert Peary after Herbert L. Bridgman, one of the members of the Peary Arctic Club in New York.

The northernmost human remains of the Independence I culture were described at Cape Bridgman by Peter Dawes in a letter to Eigil Knuth; they comprise three sites of tent rings and flagstones, although it is likely that this was a short-term expedition with permanent settlement at Frigg Fjord slightly to the south. A Thule culture tent ring further north was found by Bliss Bay in 2023 by a National Geographic expedition.

== Geography ==
Cape Bridgman is located on the northern side of the mouth of Frederick E. Hyde Fjord, Peary Land. Cape John Flagler is the headland on the southern side of the fjord entrance. Administratively it is part of the Northeast Greenland National Park.

In 1900 this headland was Robert Peary's easternmost accurate geographic exploration in the north of Greenland, for further south he encountered fog. In 1907 it became an important landmark for the Denmark expedition which mapped for the first time the unknown area to the south and southeast of the cape, as well as part of the Daly Range, rising to the west above the plain.

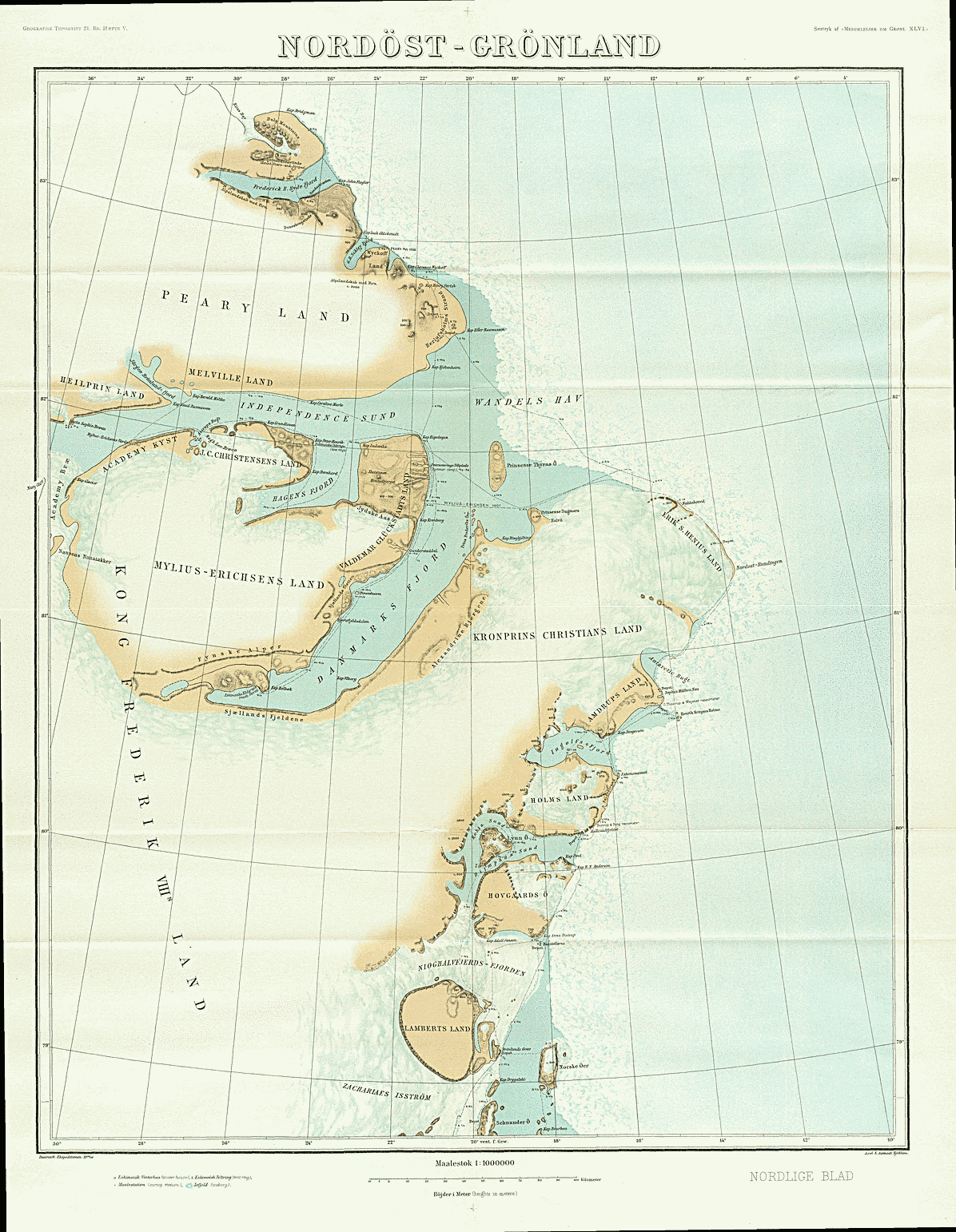
1911 map of NE Greenland by J. P. Koch showing at the top his northernmost explorations.
