= Moore Glacier =

Glacier in northern Greenland

- Moore Gletscher
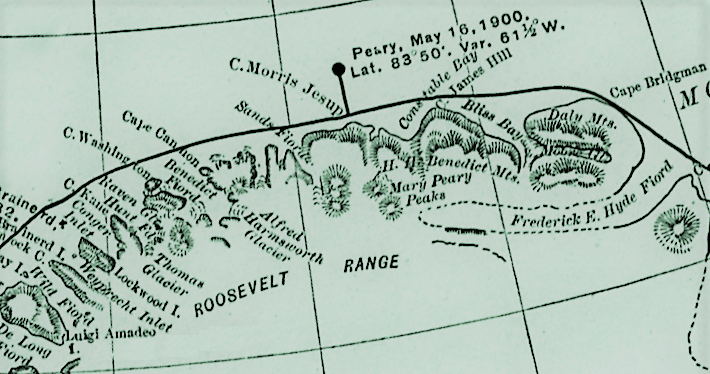
- Robert Peary's 1903 Northern Greenland map section showing "Moore Gl."

- Location within Greenland
- Type: Valley glacier
- Location: Greenland
- Coordinates: 83°22′N 28°15′W
- Length: 30 km (19 mi)
- Width: 4 km (2.5 mi)
- Terminus: Bliss Bay; Wandel Sea

Moore Glacier (Danish: Moore Gletscher) is a glacier in northern Greenland. Administratively it belongs to the Northeast Greenland National Park. Between 2006 and 2010 there was an automatic weather station in the glacier.

The glacier was named by Robert Peary after Mr. Charles Moore, who convinced US President William McKinley to keep supporting Peary's Polar ventures in the face of the United States Department of the Navy opposing further explorations.

== Geography ==
The Moore Glacier is the largest of the valley glaciers located in the area of the easternmost subranges of the Roosevelt Range. It flows roughly in a northwestern direction from the southeast and stretches between the H. H. Benedict Range to the southwest and the Bertelsen Glacier to the northeast.

The Moore Glacier has its terminus at the head of the southeastern shore of Bliss Bay, which is permanently clogged with ice. The Stjernebannertinde, highest peak of the H. H. Benedict Range, rises above the left side of the glacier to a height of 1,433 m (4,701 ft).

== See also ==
- List of glaciers in Greenland
- Peary Land
