= H. H. Benedict Range =

Mountain range in northern Greenland

- H. H. Benedict Bjerge
- Map of Northern Ellesmere Island and far Northern Greenland.

Highest point
- Peak: Stjernebannertinde
- Elevation: 1,433 m (4,701 ft)
- Listing: List of mountain ranges of Greenland

Dimensions
- Length: 60 km (37 mi) E/W
- Width: 30 km (19 mi) N/S

Geography
- Location within Greenland
- Country: Greenland
- Region: Peary Land
- Range coordinates: 83°20′N 33°0′W
- Parent range: Roosevelt Range

Geology
- Rock age(s): Precambrian, Silurian

The H. H. Benedict Range or H. H. Benedict Mountains (Danish: H. H. Benedict Bjerge) is a mountain range in Peary Land, Northern Greenland. Administratively this range is part of the Northeast Greenland National Park.

The H. H. Benedict range is part of the northernmost mountain system in the world. The area where its ridges rise is barren and uninhabited.

== History ==
The mountain chain was named by Robert Peary after Henry H. Benedict (1844–1935), one of the founding members of the Peary Arctic Club in New York. Besides his financial support Mr Benedict had gifted a pianola for the entertainment of the members of the expedition.

Peary saw the range from a distance, but didn't explore it. Aerial surveys begun by Lauge Koch in the 1920s mapped the area and Danish surveyors named some features. Only in 1996 did an expedition climb the highest point of the range.

== Geography ==
The H. H. Benedict Range is a subrange of the Roosevelt Range. Its highest peak is 1,433 m (4,701 ft) high Stjernebannertinde, a conspicuous summit.

The range is located in Northern Peary Land, stretching north of the Frederick E. Hyde Fjord. The valleys between the mountains are filled with glaciers, the largest of which are the Borup Glacier, Moore Glacier and Ydun Glacier.

The H. H. Benedict Range runs roughly from east to west in Johannes V. Jensen Land east of the Mary Peary Peaks. The Daly Range (Daly Bjerge) rises to the east, between the eastern end of the H. H. Benedict Range and the Wandel Sea.

== Geology ==
In the same manner as the Roosevelt Range the H. H. Benedict Range is part of the Caledonian orogeny extending eastward from north Ellesmere Island.

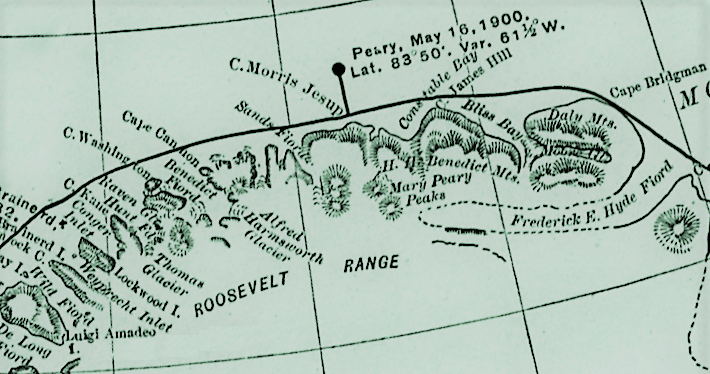
Roosevelt Range section of Robert Peary's 1900 explorations map "Polar Regions".

== See also ==
- List of mountain ranges of Greenland
- Peary Land
