= Helvetia Tinde =

Mountain in the Roosevelt Range, Greenland

- Location within Greenland

Highest point
- Elevation: 1,929 m (6,329 ft)
- Listing: List of mountains in Greenland
- Coordinates: 83°22′25″N 35°16′16″W

Geography
- Location: Peary Land, Greenland
- Parent range: Roosevelt Range

Climbing
- First ascent: 1969

Helvetia Tinde (Helvetia Peak) is the highest mountain in the Roosevelt Range, Northern Greenland. It is also the highest mountain of the northernmost mountain range on Earth.

Administratively, it belongs to the Northeast Greenland National Park.

== Geography ==
Helvetia Tinde is located about 750 kilometres (470 mi) from the North Pole. It is the highest peak of North Peary Land.

This mountain rises in the central region of the Roosevelt Range proper, west of the Polkorridoren (Polar Corridor) pass, about 15 km (9.3 mi) SSW of the head of Sands Fjord. Helvetia Tinde is 1,929-metre high (6,329 ft) high although according to other sources it is not quite as high.

== Climbing history ==
Helvetia Tinde was first climbed in 1969 by the members of an expedition by the British Joint Services during a topographic and geological survey of the northern part of Peary Land.

The second ascent of the summit (and 1st American) was made via a new route (east face) on 17 July 2001 by the 2001 Return To The Top Of The World Expedition led by John Jancik, Ken Zerbst and Terri Baker with David Baker, Jim McCrain, Jim Schaefer, Joe Sears, Vernon Tejas, and Steve Gardiner.

== See also ==
- List of mountains in Greenland
- Peary Land
