= William Edward Davies =

American geologist (1917–1990)

- Born: December 24, 1917; Cleveland, Ohio, United States
- Died: June 27, 1990 (aged 72)
- Education: Massachusetts Institute of Technology; Michigan State University
- Scientific career
- Fields: geology, speleologist
- Workplaces: U.S. Geological Survey

William Edward Davies (December 24, 1917 – June 27, 1990) was a notable American geologist, speleologist and official of the U.S. Geological Survey (USGS). He produced pioneering surveys of West Virginia and Maryland caves.

== Biography ==
Davies was born in Cleveland, Ohio. He was a graduate of the Massachusetts Institute of Technology and received a master's degree in geology at Michigan State University. He came to Washington, DC during World War II, at which time he was an officer with the Army Map Service. He stayed on as a civilian until 1949 when he joined the USGS. His assignments included surveying caves in Pennsylvania and West Virginia and research on permafrost. Until the publication of his work on caves in Maryland, the topic was virtually unknown to the public. In the mid-1950s he took part in a USGS expedition to Antarctica. The Davies Escarpment in Antarctica was named for him. He retired in the mid-1980s.

Davies died from a heart attack at age 72 in Falls Church, Virginia, and was survived by his wife, Geraldine, a son and a daughter.

== Works ==
- Davies, W.E., (1949), Caverns of West Virginia; State of West Virginia: West Virginia Geological and Economic Survey (Series: Geological and Economic Survey, Volume XIX. A.); 1958 revision (330 pgs) and a 1965 supplement (72 pages).
- Davies, W.E., (1950), The Caves of Maryland; State of Maryland: Department of Geology (Series: Mines and Water Resources, Bulletin 7; 70 pages)
- Davies, W.E. (1971), Historical Engineering Geology of the Chesapeake and Ohio Canal: Guidebook for the Geological Society of Washington, 10 pgs.
- Davies, William E.; Mast, Vernon; Ohlmacher, Gregory C. (1985), Landslides and related features, West Virginia, Ohio, Kentucky; Huntington; U.S. Geological Survey Open-File Report: 85-656,
- Davies, W. E. (1986), Engineering aspects of karst U.S. Geological Survey,
- Davies, W.E. (1989), Highlights of the Geology and Engineering of the Chesapeake and Ohio Canal: 28th International Geological Congress Guidebook T206, American Geophysical Union, Washington, D.C., 25 pgs.
- Morgan, I.M., Davies, W.E. (1991), Geology of caves U.S. Geological Survey, 19 pgs.
- Davies, W.E. (1999), The Geology and Engineering Structures of the Chesapeake and Ohio Canal; C&O Canal Association, Glen Echo, Maryland, 617pgs. ISBN 9780875905716
