= Lincoln Sea =

Body of water in the Arctic Ocean

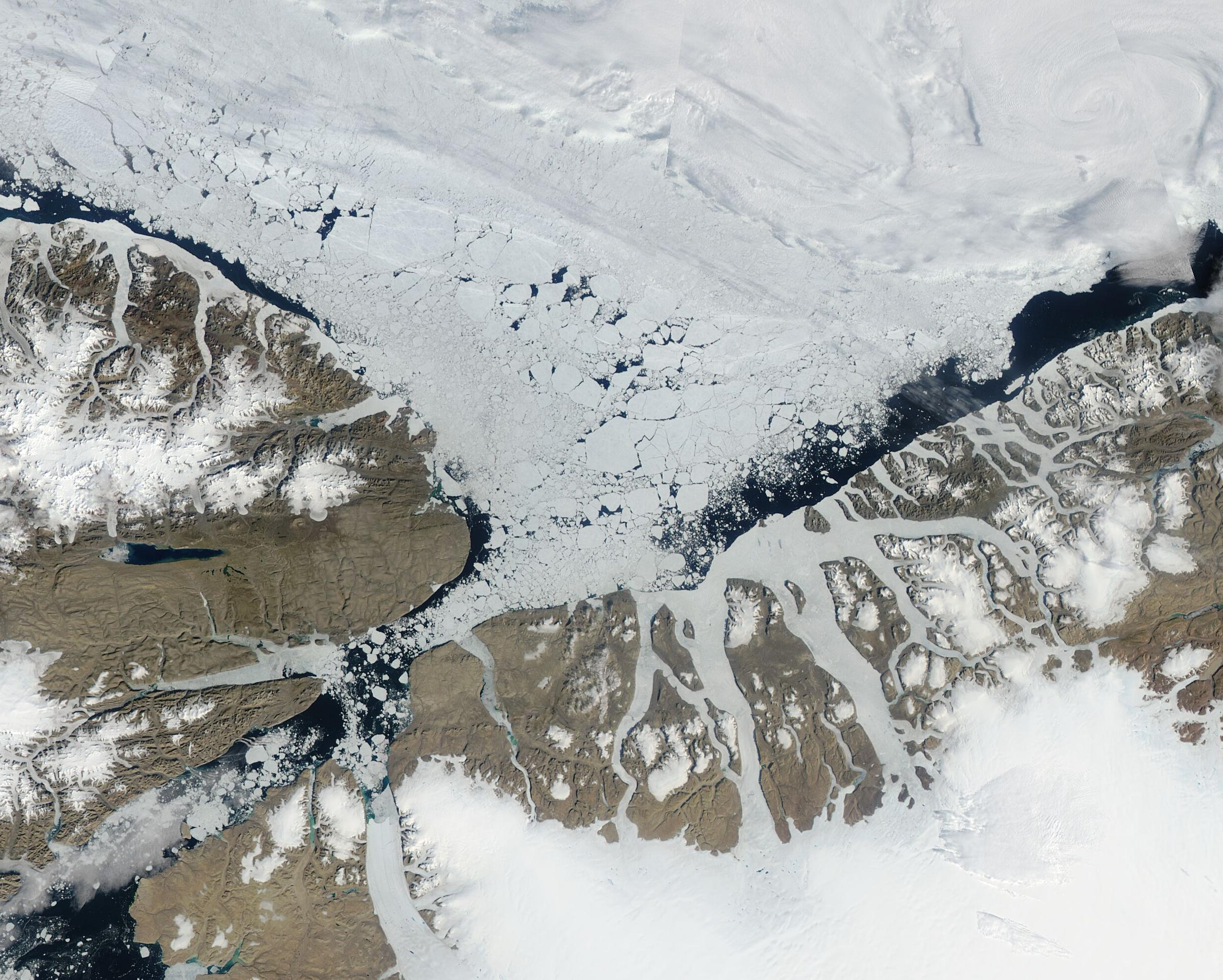
- Satellite view of Lincoln Sea in July 2020

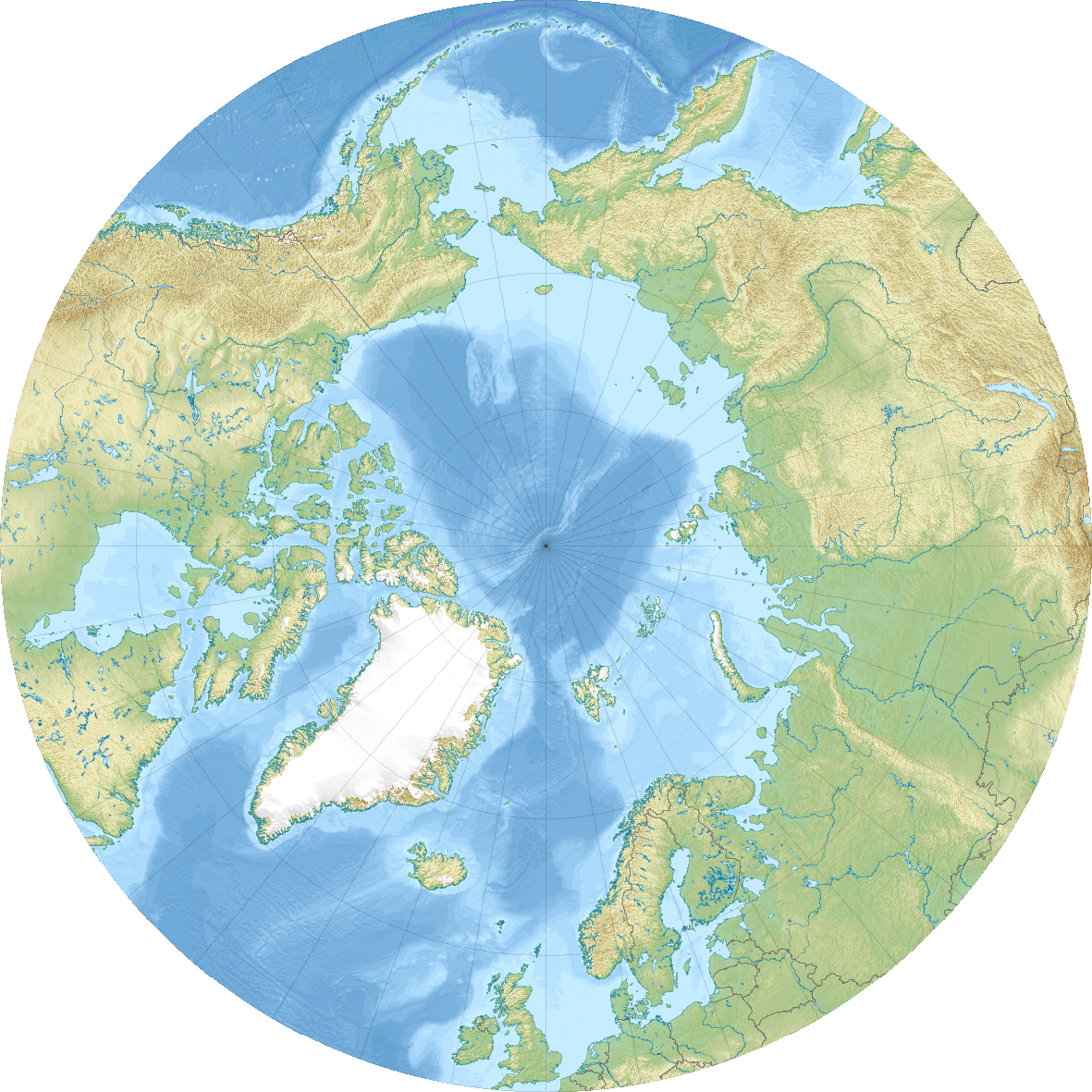
- Location within Arctic

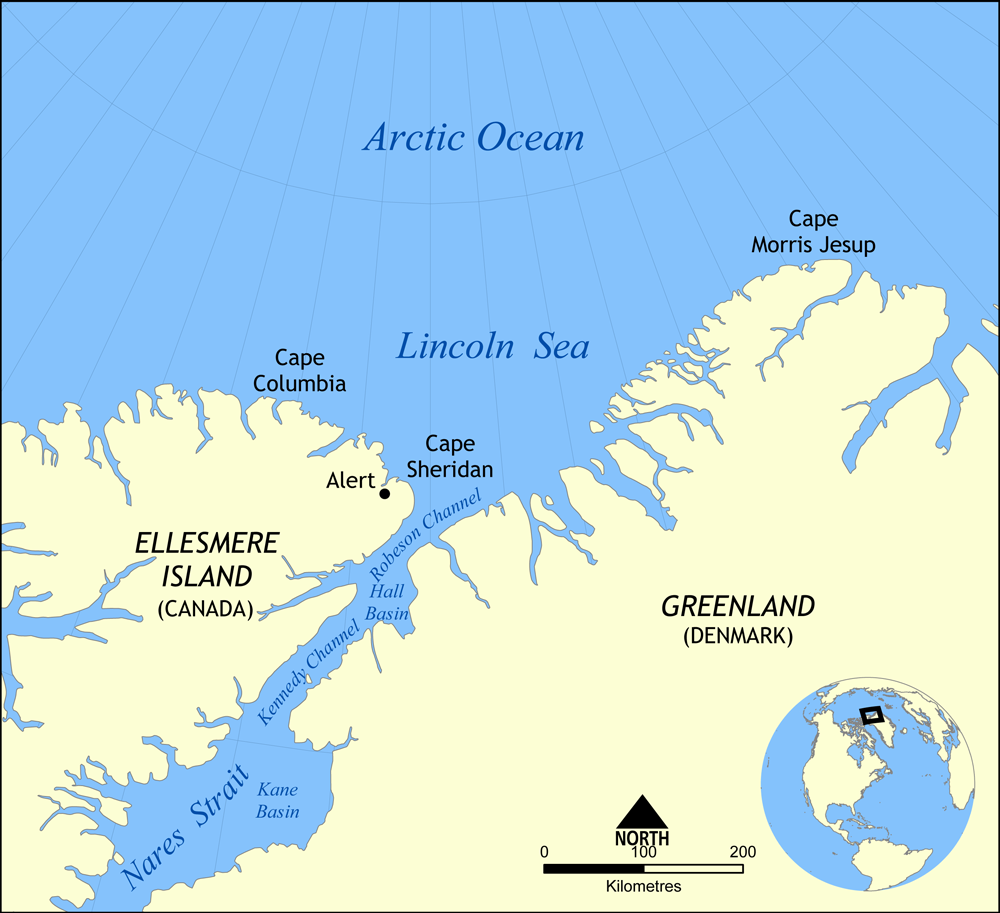
- Map of the Lincoln Sea
- Coordinates: 83°N 58°W
- Type: Sea
- Basin countries: Canada and Greenland
- Surface area: 64,000 km^{2} (25,000 sq mi)
- Average depth: 257 m (843 ft)
- Water volume: 16,000 km^{3} (1.3×10^{10} acre⋅ft)
- Frozen: Practically all year round

The Lincoln Sea (French: Mer de Lincoln; Danish: Lincolnhavet) is a body of water in the Arctic Ocean, stretching from Cape Columbia, Canada, in the west to Cape Morris Jesup, Greenland, in the east. The northern limit is defined as the great circle line between those two headlands. It is covered with sea ice throughout the year, the thickest sea ice in the Arctic Ocean, which can be up to 15 m (49 ft) thick. Water depths range from 100 m (330 ft) to 300 m (980 ft). Water and ice from Lincoln Sea empty into Robeson Channel, the northernmost part of Nares Strait, most of the time.

The sea was named after Robert Todd Lincoln, then United States Secretary of War, on Adolphus W. Greely's 1881–1884 Arctic expedition into Lady Franklin Bay.

Alert, the northernmost station of Canada, is the only populated place on the shore of the Lincoln Sea.

The body of water to the east of Lincoln Sea (east of Cape Morris Jesup) is the Wandel Sea.

== Extent ==
The International Hydrographic Organization defines the limits of the Lincoln Sea as follows:

On the North. Cape Columbia to Cape Morris Jesup (Greenland).

On the South. Cape Columbia through Northeastern shore of Ellesmere Island to Cape Sheridan to Cape Bryant (Greenland) through Greenland to Cape Morris Jesup.

== Currents and Oceanic Circulation ==
Because of the severe ice conditions that last year-round, oceanographic measurements of the Lincoln Sea have been all but impossible. Before the 1980s, only low-flying aircraft samplings and ground observations from ice islands could be attempted; these did not stray far from the shores of Greenland and the Canadian Arctic Archipelago due to the harsh environment. Between 1989 and 1994, the field experiments in Project Spinnaker were underway, implementing instrumentation that captured temperature and salinity profiles well into the heart of the Lincoln Sea. Taken just east of where the North American continent intersects the Lomonosov Ridge, these observations revealed the oceanographic features and current formations within and surrounding the Lincoln Sea.

Along the continental margins of the Arctic Ocean basin, narrow boundary currents are hypothesized to house intense large-scale advection that is critical in the general circulation of Arctic waters. From the Bering Strait, Pacific Ocean waters flow counterclockwise (cyclonically) along the northern shores of Canada, passing through the Lincoln Sea. Atlantic Ocean waters cyclonically flow in from and return to the Eurasian basin along the Greenland Sea continental slope. The waters of these basins converge at the Lincoln Sea, creating unique vertical temperature and salinity profiles here. Measurements detail that both the Pacific and Eurasian Ocean water profiles are clearly offset from one another, an important facet of the hydrography of the Lincoln Sea.

The Lincoln Sea has been found to contain water with three distinct properties. The first concerns the water in the inner part of the Lincoln Sea shelf, where the temperature and salinity profiles increase from the surface to the seafloor. The second involves the water covering the outer part of the shelf, including the slope; the waters here hold attributes similar to those in the Canadian basin and thus not unlike those from the Pacific. The third includes the waters north of the shelf's slope. These waters protrude into the Arctic basin's large-scale circulation, and so their characteristics appear to change over to those found in the Eurasian basin.

Along the continental margins of the Arctic Ocean basin, narrow boundary currents are hypothesized to house intense large-scale advection that is critical in the general circulation of Arctic waters. One of these boundary currents resides along the sloping edge of the Lincoln Sea shelf, between the base and the shelf break at approximately 1,600 m (5,200 ft). The current's strength is 5–6 cm/s (2–2 2/5 in/s), according to long-term measurements. Assuming an undercurrent with an average strength of 4 cm/s (1 3/5 in/s) and dimensions of 50 km (31 mi) in length and 1000 m in depth, the transport delivered over the slope of the Lincoln Sea shelf would be 2 sverdrups, where 1 sverdrup equals 10^{6} m^{3}/s. Measurements reveal that this undercurrent shares comparable features to that found in the Beaufort Sea, whose boundary currents are responsible for large-scale advection within the Arctic circulation. Because of this mutual oceanographic behavior, it has been determined that the Lincoln Sea undercurrent continuously flows and is a component of the boundary current system that spans between Alaska and Greenland along the northern shores of the Canadian archipelago.

== Sea ice ==
In May 2004 and 2005, electromagnetic measurements from helicopters revealed insights into the thickness of the sea ice in the Lincoln Sea and surrounding waters. With thicknesses ranging between 3.9 and 4.2 m (13 and 14 ft), multi-year ice dominates south of 84°N. First-year ice, with thicknesses ranging between 0.9 and 2.2 m (3 and 7 1/5 ft), denotes the refreezing of the Lincoln Polynya ice. These helicopter measurements concur with satellite-based radar imagery as well as ground-based electromagnetic observations. Drifting buoys have exposed a southward drift of sea ice toward Ellesmere Island and Nares Strait. It has been concluded that shear in the Lincoln Sea narrow boundary current plays an important role in shifting and thus removing sea ice from the Arctic region.

The majority of sea ice export takes place on the eastern edges of the Arctic Ocean circulation near Greenland through the Fram Strait. Sea ice export through the Canadian archipelago was originally assumed to be zero, but that is not the case. The Lincoln Sea contains very thick multi-year sea ice, and so was thought to be stationary because of the apparent lack of oceanic outlets. However, according to a Canadian sea ice study, an area of approximately 22,500 km^{2} (8,700 sq mi) of multi-year sea ice is drained through the Nares Strait each year. During the Northern Hemisphere winter, an area of about 225 km^{2} (87 sq mi) of ice reforms, resulting in 335 km^{2} (129 sq mi) of total sea ice drainage. Although this represents only one of the many pathways from the Arctic Ocean basin through the Canadian archipelago, "…this [total drainage] is an order of magnitude less than the flux of sea ice out of [the] Fram Strait."

== Dispute ==
A disagreement over a 200-square-kilometre (77 sq mi) section of the Lincoln Sea emerged after 1973 when Canada and Denmark signed a treaty establishing the offshore boundary north of Canada's Ellesmere Island and Danish-controlled Greenland but left portions of it undefined.

From Canada's point of view, the point of focus in the Lincoln Sea dispute has been Denmark's inclusion of Beaumont Island (Greenland) (not to be confused with Beaumont Island off the west coast of Graham Land, Antarctica) off Greenland's northwest coast in calculating the boundary. The boundary is determined in that region by an "equidistance" principle that draws the line halfway between points along each country's coastline. Canada has basically argued that Beaumont Island is too insignificant to be used by Greenland to help determine the international boundary.

In June 2022, Canada and Denmark formalized the maritime boundary between Nunavut and Greenland, including in the Lincoln Sea, and establishing a land border on Hans Island.
