= Peary Land =

Peninsula in northern Greenland

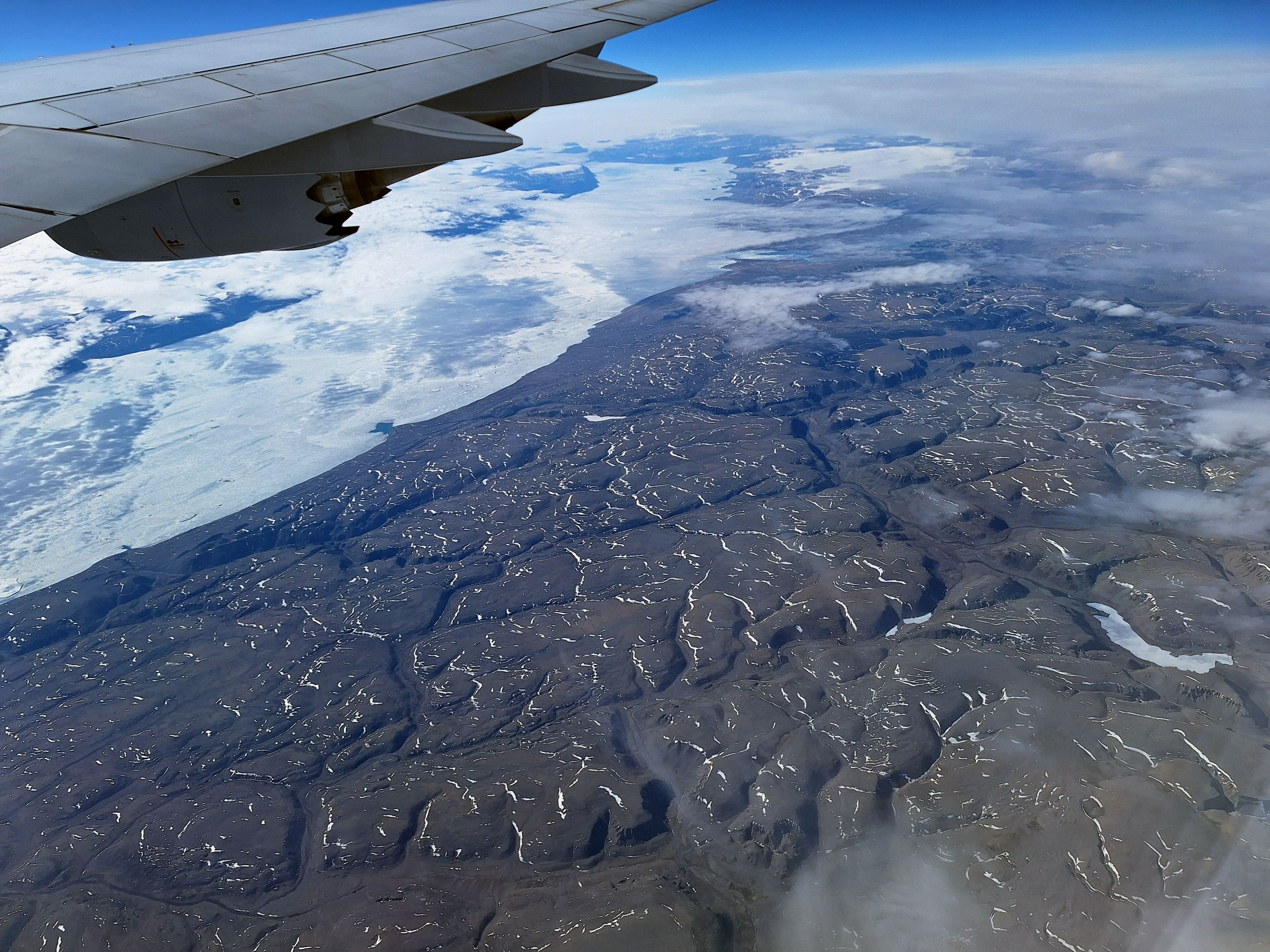
- Aerial photo in July 2026, looking southwest. Independence Fjord is visible on the left.

- Location within Greenland

Geography
- Location: Northeast Greenland
- Coordinates: 82°38′N 32°30′W
- Adjacent to: Victoria Fjord Arctic Ocean; Independence Fjord
- Area: 57,000 km^{2} (22,000 sq mi)
- Length: 360 km (224 mi)
- Width: 200 km (120 mi)
- Highest elevation: 1,929 m (6329 ft)
- Highest point: Helvetia Tinde

Administration
- Greenland (Denmark)

Demographics
- Population: 0

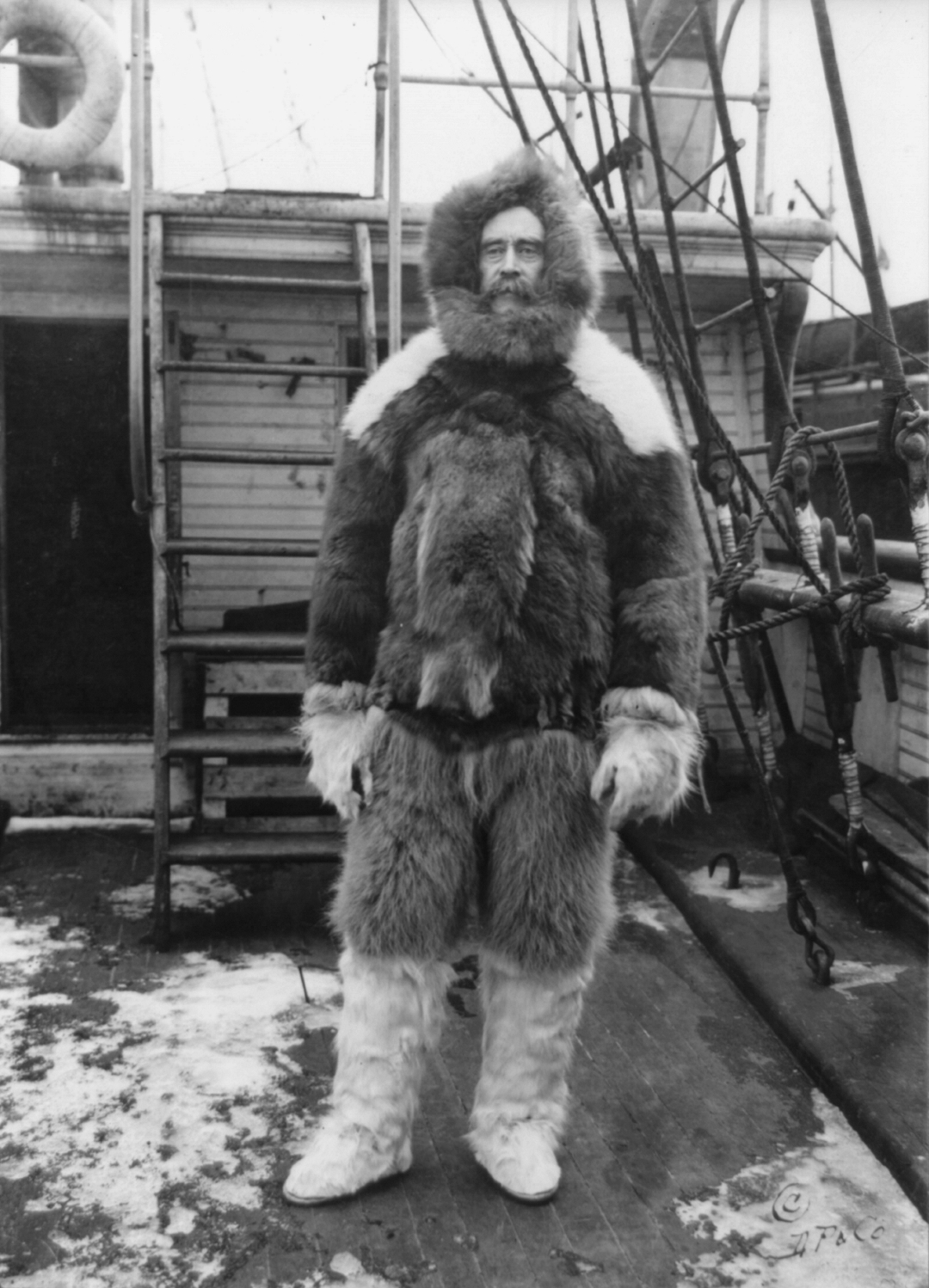
American explorer Robert Peary in arctic furs

Peary Land is a peninsula in northern Greenland, extending into the Arctic Ocean. It reaches from Victoria Fjord in the west to Independence Fjord in the south and southeast, and to the Arctic Ocean in the north, with Cape Morris Jesup, the northernmost point of Greenland's mainland, and Cape Bridgman in the northeast.

== History ==
=== Ancient settlements ===
Peary Land was historically inhabited by three separate cultures, during which times the climate was milder than presently. It contains the northernmost ruins on earth, an archaeological site found in 2023.

- Independence I culture, Paleo-Eskimo (around 2000 BC, oldest remains dating from 2400 BC)
- Independence II culture, Paleo-Eskimo (800 BC to 200 BC)
- Thule culture (ancestral to the modern Inuit, around AD 1300)

=== Peary's explorations ===
The area is named after Robert E. Peary, who first explored it during his expedition of 1891 to 1892. Originally, Peary Land was believed to be an island, separated from the main island by the so-called Peary Channel, an assumed connection between Nordenskiöld Fjord and Independence Fjord which in fact does not exist. Ludvig Mylius-Erichsen (1872–1907), the ill-fated leader of the Denmark expedition, searched in vain for the Peary Channel in 1907 and was misled to his death by existing maps. Knud Rasmussen's First Thule Expedition confirmed in 1912 that Peary Land is a peninsula. There are more than 200 kilometres (120 mi) of dry land up to 1,500 metres (4,900 ft) high between Nordenskiöld Fjord and Independence Fjord.

=== Research and mining ===
There are two Arctic research stations on Jørgen Brønlund Fjord: Brønlundhus (erected in 1948) and Cape Harald Moltke (erected in 1972). Both stations were built on the initiative of Eigil Knuth and have been the basis for many scientific expeditions. Cape Harald Moltke station was built later in connection with use of the natural runway east of Jørgen Brønlund Fjord mouth. The stations are located 10 kilometres (6.2 mi) from each other on either side of the fjord, with Brønlundhus on the western side. Travel between them in summer is by boat, depending on ice conditions. Since the death of Eigil Knuth, the stations have been administered by the Peary Land Foundation. Today, Brønlundhus can be characterised as a museum, with a collection of artefacts from polar explorations.

In 1993, zinc and lead deposits were discovered in the Citronen Fjord. They are deemed the largest yet unexploited zinc deposits in the world, and the exploitation of the Citronen mine is in the preparation phase. Important zinc and barium deposits have also been found at Navarana Fjord.

== Geography ==
Peary Land is bounded by the Lincoln Sea (west of Cape Morris Jesup) and Wandel Sea of the Arctic Ocean in the north. Frederick E. Hyde Fjord, which cuts into Peary Land from the east 150 kilometres (93 mi) deep, divides it into Northern Peary Land and Southern Peary Land. Cape Eiler Rasmussen is the easternmost point. The coastline is deeply indented by smaller fjords, such as G.B. Schley Fjord and Hellefisk Fjord in the east, and Sands Fjord, Benedict Fjord, J.P. Koch Fjord, De Long Fjord and Weyprecht Fjord in the west. Børglum River, the largest river in Greenland, is located in Peary Land.

Peary Land is not part of any municipality but belongs to the Northeast Greenland National Park. The size of the region is about 375 kilometres (233 mi) from east to west and 200 kilometres (124 mi) from north to south, with an estimated area of 57,000 square kilometres (22,008 sq mi). It is only a bit more than 700 kilometres (435 mi) south of the North Pole.

Peary Land is not covered by an ice cap because the air is too dry to produce snow. Precipitation levels are so low (only about 25 millimetres or 1 inch per year) that most of its surface is polar desert. Located mostly north of the 82°N parallel, it contains the most northerly ice-free region of the world, mostly in Southern Peary Land (such as Melville Land and Herlufsholm Strand) on the northern side of Independence Fjord. It was not covered by glaciers during the most recent ice age. However, in its western part, there is the Hans Tausen Ice Cap with ice at least 344 metres (1,129 ft) thick.

=== Mountains ===
Peary Land is mountainous; the highest elevation is Helvetia Tinde reaching up to 1,929 m (6,329 ft) in the heavily glaciated and little-explored Roosevelt Range, the northernmost mountain range in the world. The 1,737 m (5,699 ft) high Wistar Bjerg in the Nordkrone and the 1,433 m (4,701 ft) high Stjernebannertinde, highest point of the H.H. Benedict Range (a subrange of the Roosevelt Range).

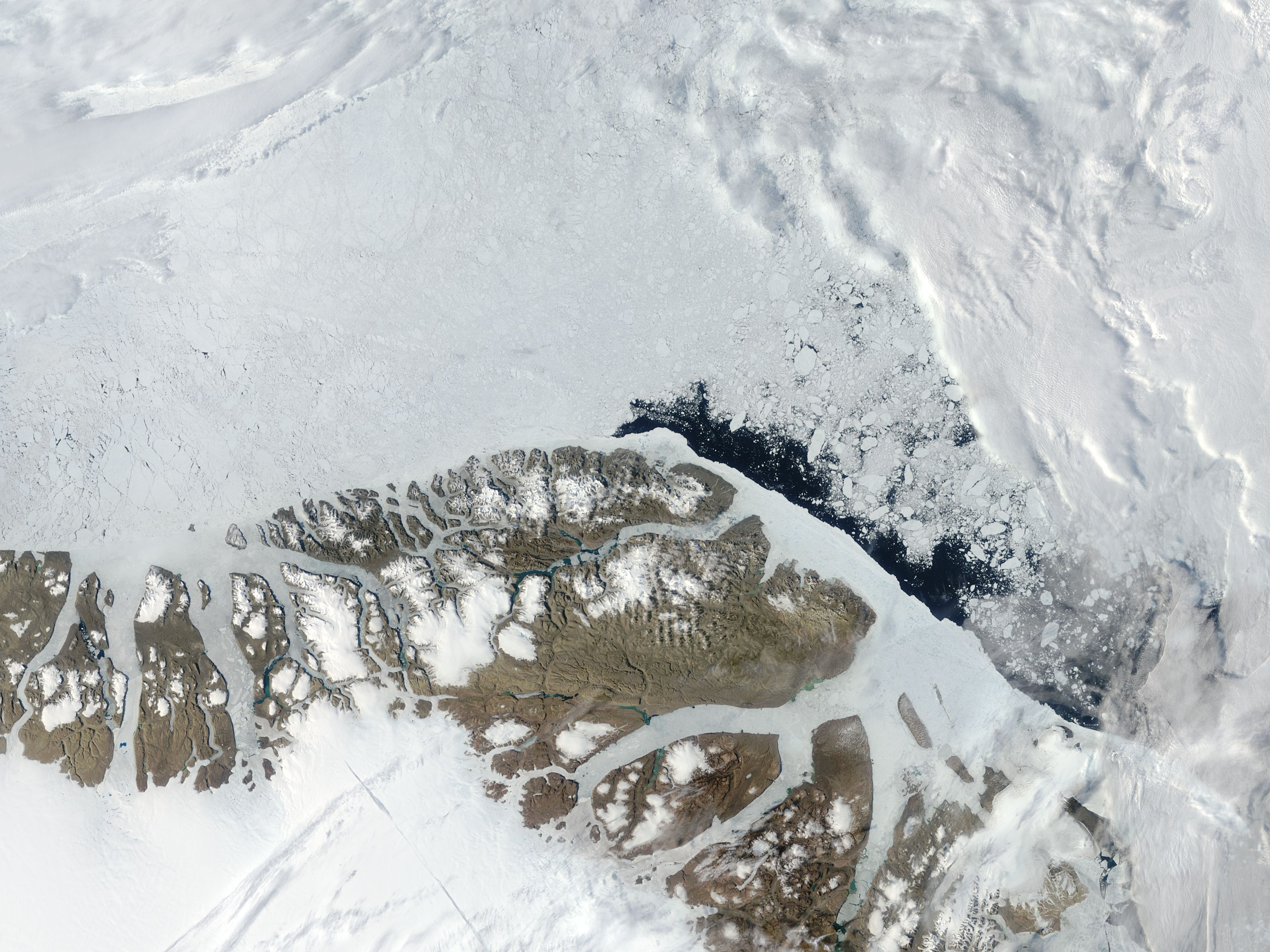
July 2004 NASA satellite image of northern Peary Land including Cape Morris Jesup.

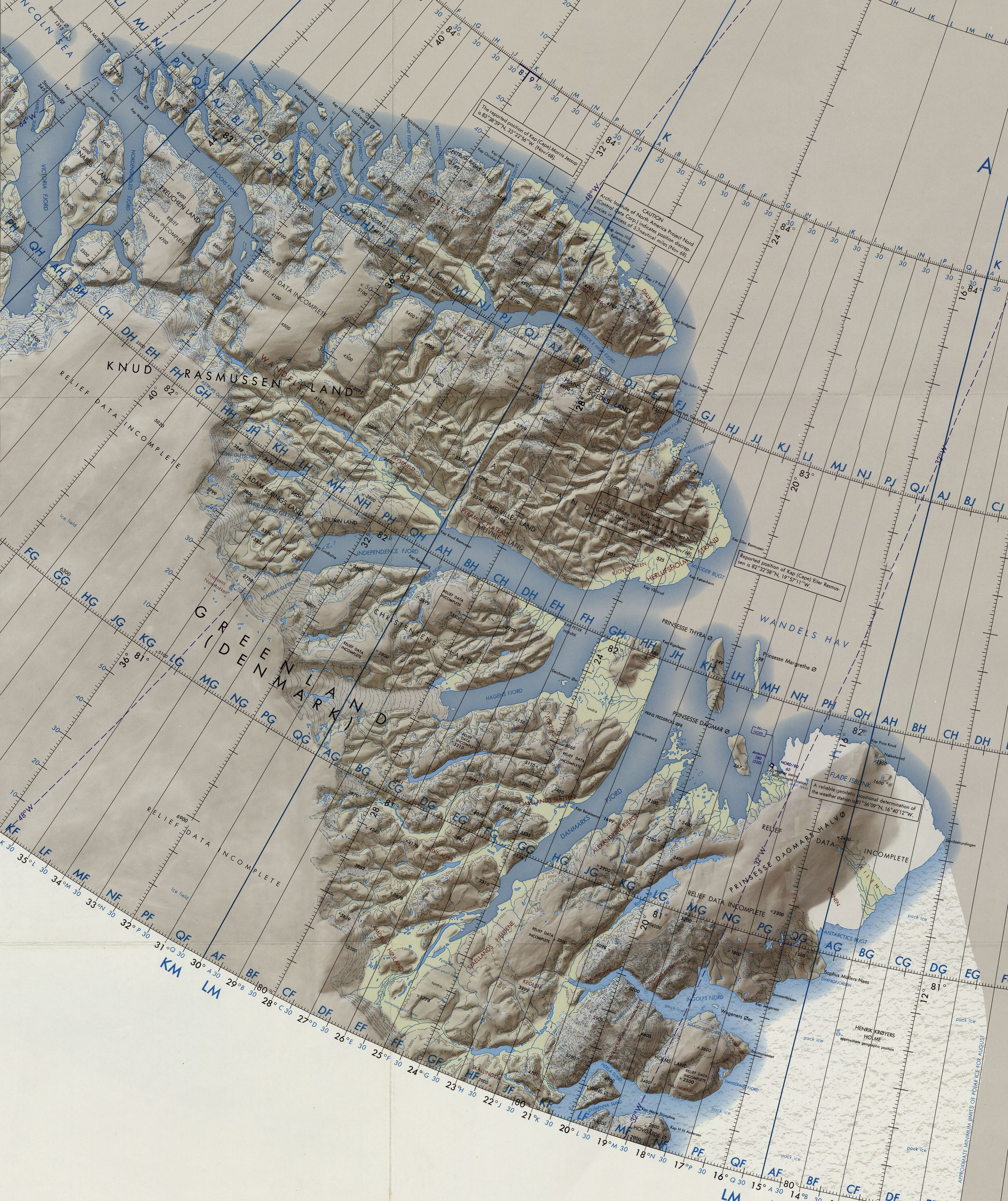
Map of Far Northeastern Greenland.

Peary Land - location within Greenland

== Flora and fauna ==
Musk oxen and Peary Land collared lemmings are supported by the sparse vegetation, which covers only about 5% of the surface, mostly in the area around Jørgen Brønlund Fjord. However, plants are found all the way to the northernmost limits of land on Kaffeklubben Island. Other fauna include Arctic fox, Greenland wolf, polar bear, and Arctic hare. In former times there were also caribou, but the last live caribou reported from Northern Greenland were seen in Hall Land in 1922.

The flora include 33 species of flowering plants.

One to two million years ago, when climates were warmer, trees such as larch, black spruce, birch, yew, and thuja grew in northernmost Peary Land.
