= Centrum Island =

Island in North Greenland

Native name: Centrum Ø
- Location of Centrum Island in Greenland
- Interactive map of Centrum Island

Geography
- Location: Lincoln Sea
- Coordinates: 82°43′N 48°07′W
- Area: 0.0524 km^{2} (0.0202 sq mi)http://en.nunagis.gl
- Length: 0.470 km (0.292 mi)
- Width: 0.190 km (0.1181 mi)http://en.nunagis.gl
- Coastline: 1.14 km (0.708 mi)http://en.nunagis.gl
- Highest point: Unnamed

Administration
- Greenland
- Unincorporated area: Northeast Greenland National Park

Demographics
- Population: 0 (2021)
- Pop. density: 0/km^{2} (0/sq mi)
- Ethnic groups: none

Centrum Island (in Danish: Centrum Ø) is a small island in north Greenland, south east of John Murray Island, and west of J.P. Koch Fjord. The island is described as 'inconspicuous and fladt'.

The island is approximately 52408 m^{2} (5.2408 ha) in size based on measurements on topographical maps.

The island was visited and named by the Second Thule Expedition on July 2–3, 1917. The name was chosen because the island would be the center of cartographical investigations being performed. On July 3, 1917 the expedition left behind things, which were found in 1978 by the Danish Sirius Dog Sled Patrol and again in 1985.

Thorild Wulff collected lichens, vascular plants and bryophytes on the Island.
