= 41st meridian west =

Line of longitude

41st meridian west

The meridian 41° west of Greenwich is a line of longitude that extends from the North Pole across the Arctic Ocean, Greenland, the Atlantic Ocean, South America, the Southern Ocean, and Antarctica to the South Pole.

The 41st meridian west forms a great circle with the 139th meridian east.

== From Pole to Pole ==
Starting at the North Pole and heading south to the South Pole, the 41st meridian west passes through:

Co-ordinates	Country, territory or sea	Notes
90°0′N 41°0′W	Arctic Ocean	
83°40′N 41°0′W	Lincoln Sea	
83°12′N 41°0′W	De Long Fjord	
83°10′N 41°0′W	Greenland	Nansen Land
82°46′N 41°0′W	J.P. Koch Fjord	
82°39′N 41°0′W	Greenland	Freuchen Land
63°48′N 41°0′W	Greenland	Odinland
63°21′N 41°0′W	Atlantic Ocean	
2°53′S 41°0′W	Brazil	Ceará; Piauí — from 5°21′S 41°0′W; Pernambuco — from 8°24′S 41°0′W; Bahia — from 8°46′S 41°0′W; Minas Gerais — from 15°42′S 41°0′W; Espírito Santo — from 18°9′S 41°0′W; Minas Gerais — for about 18 km from 18°40′S 41°0′W; Espírito Santo — from 18°49′S 41°0′W; Minas Gerais — from 19°5′S 41°0′W; Espírito Santo — from 19°30′S 41°0′W; Rio de Janeiro — from 21°16′S 41°0′W
21°24′S 41°0′W	Atlantic Ocean	Passing close to the coast of Brazil, east of São João da Barra
21°50′S 41°0′W	Brazil	Rio de Janeiro
22°1′S 41°0′W	Atlantic Ocean	
60°0′S 41°0′W	Southern Ocean	
77°39′S 41°0′W	Antarctica	Claimed by both Argentina (Argentine Antarctica) and United Kingdom (British Antarctic Territory)

== See also ==
- 40th meridian west
- 42nd meridian west
