= 42nd meridian west =

Line of longitude

42nd meridian west

The meridian 42° west of Greenwich is a line of longitude that extends from the North Pole across the Arctic Ocean, Greenland, the Atlantic Ocean, South America, the Southern Ocean, and Antarctica to the South Pole.

The 42nd meridian west forms a great circle with the 138th meridian east.

== From Pole to Pole ==
Starting at the North Pole and heading south to the South Pole, the 42nd meridian west passes through:

Co-ordinates	Country, territory or sea	Notes
90°0′N 42°0′W	Arctic Ocean	
83°40′N 42°0′W	Lincoln Sea	
83°13′N 42°0′W	Greenland	Nansen Land
82°51′N 42°0′W	J.P. Koch Fjord / Navarana Fjord	
82°40′N 42°0′W	Greenland	Freuchen Land
62°43′N 42°0′W	Atlantic Ocean	
2°43′S 42°0′W	Brazil	Maranhão; Piauí — from 3°14′S 42°0′W; Bahia — from 9°13′S 42°0′W; Minas Gerais — from 15°9′S 42°0′W; Rio de Janeiro — from 20°56′S 42°0′W, the mainland and Ilha do Cabo Frio
23°1′S 42°0′W	Atlantic Ocean	Passing just east of the Shag Rocks, South Georgia and the South Sandwich Islands (at 53°31′S 42°1′W); Passing just west of Black Rock, South Georgia and the South Sandwich Islands (at 53°39′S 41°49′W)
60°0′S 42°0′W	Southern Ocean	
77°40′S 42°0′W	Antarctica	Claimed by both Argentina (Argentine Antarctica) and United Kingdom (British Antarctic Territory)

== See also ==
- 41st meridian west
- 43rd meridian west
