= Henson Glacier (Greenland) =

Glacier in northern Greenland

- Henson Gletscher
- Location within Greenland
- Type: Tidal outlet glacier
- Location: Greenland
- Coordinates: 82°21′00″N 40°20′00″W
- Length: ca 50 km
- Terminus: J.P. Koch Fjord; Lincoln Sea

Henson Glacier (Danish: Henson Gletscher), is one of the major glaciers in northern Greenland.

It was named in 1917 for African-American Arctic explorer Matthew Henson by Knud Rasmussen during the Second Thule Expedition to north Greenland. The Henson Gletscher Formation, which preserves trilobites and echinoderm fossils, among others, is named after this glacier.

== Geography ==
The Henson Glacier originates in the Greenland Ice Cap. It is roughly north–south oriented and has its terminus at the head of the J.P. Koch Fjord. The Expedition Glacier discharges from the west north of the terminus of the Henson Glacier, between the head of the fjord and Navarana Fjord on the Freuchen Land side. The Hans Tausen Ice Cap is located to the east, close to the glacier tongue.

Map of part of Ellesmere Island and far Northern Greenland.

== Bibliography ==
- H.P. Trettin (ed.), Geology of the Innuitian Orogen and Arctic Platform of Canada and Greenland. Geological Survey of Canada (1991) ISBN 978-0660131313

== See also ==
- Henson Gletscher Formation
- List of glaciers in Greenland
- Peary Land
