= Beaumont Island (Greenland) =

Island in Greenland

Beaumont Ø
- Location of Beaumont Island in Greenland
- Interactive map of Beaumont Island

Geography
- Location: Lincoln Sea
- Coordinates: 82°43′56″N 50°41′56″W
- Area: 13.2 km^{2} (5.1 sq mi)
- Length: 4.3 km (2.67 mi)
- Width: 3.5 km (2.17 mi)
- Highest elevation: 399 m (1309 ft)

Administration
- Greenland
- Zone: Northeast Greenland National Park

Demographics
- Population: 0

Beaumont Island (Danish: Beaumont Ø) is an island of the Lincoln Sea, Greenland. Administratively it belongs to the Northeast Greenland National Park.

The inclusion of this island in determining the international boundary between Canadian and Danish waters was formerly a subject of disagreement following a 1973 treaty that left parts of the offshore boundary undefined, until the boundary in the Lincoln Sea was formalized in 2022.

== Geography ==
Beaumont Island lies in the Lincoln Sea to the NNW of the mouth of Victoria Fjord. It is located almost 40 km NNE of Cape May, at the northern end of Wulff Land and 20 km west of John Murray Island. The waters around the island are icebound most of the year.

Map of part of Ellesmere Island and far Northern Greenland.

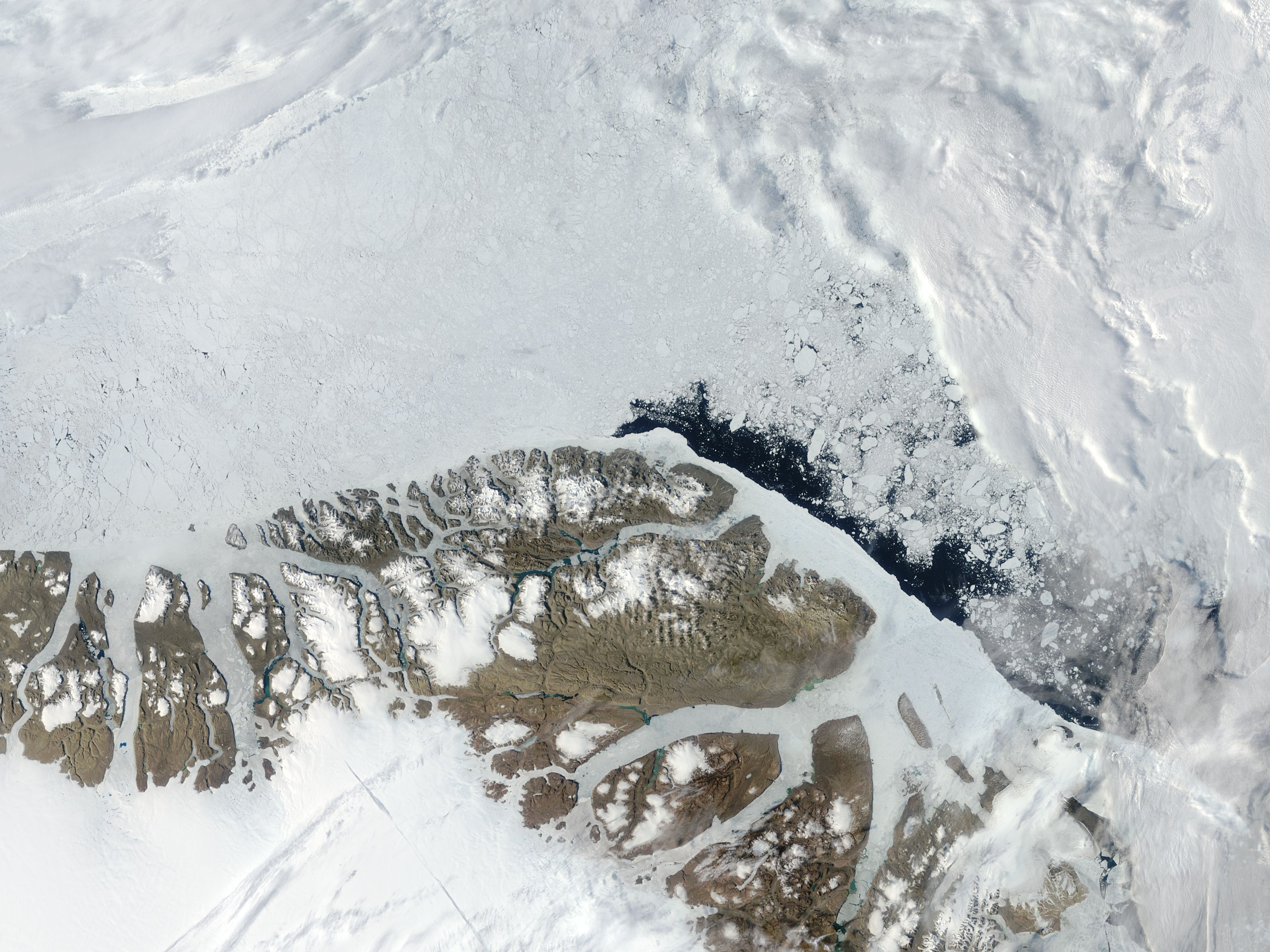
MODIS Satellite Image of Northern Greenland

== See also ==
- List of islands of Greenland
- Territorial claims in the Arctic

== Bibliography ==
- Michael Byers, Who Owns the Arctic?: Understanding Sovereignty Disputes in the North
- George Nares Narrative of a voyage to the Polar Sea during 1875–6 in H.M. ships 'Alert' and 'Discovery'
