= 38th meridian west =

Line of longitude

38th meridian west

The meridian 38° west of Greenwich is a line of longitude that extends from the North Pole across the Arctic Ocean, Greenland, the Atlantic Ocean, South America, the Southern Ocean, and Antarctica to the South Pole.

The 38th meridian west forms a great circle with the 142nd meridian east.

== From Pole to Pole ==
Starting at the North Pole and heading south to the South Pole, the 38th meridian west passes through:

Co-ordinates	Country, territory or sea	Notes
90°0′N 38°0′W	Arctic Ocean	
83°38′N 38°0′W	Lincoln Sea	
83°31′N 38°0′W	Greenland	Cape Washington
83°25′N 38°0′W	Hunt Fjord	
83°20′N 38°0′W	Greenland	Roosevelt Land
83°9′N 38°0′W	Harder Fjord	
82°30′N 38°0′W	Greenland	Amundsen Land and Hans Tausen Ice Cap
65°56′N 38°0′W	Sermilik Fjord	
65°43′N 38°0′W	Greenland	Ammassalik Island
65°41′N 38°0′W	Atlantic Ocean	
4°15′S 38°0′W	Brazil	Ceará; Rio Grande do Norte — from 5°34′S 38°0′W; Paraíba — from 6°26′S 38°0′W; Pernambuco — from 7°46′S 38°0′W; Alagoas — from 9°9′S 38°0′W; Sergipe — from 9°32′S 38°0′W; Bahia — for about 2 km from 9°38′S 38°0′W; Sergipe — from 9°39′S 38°0′W; Bahia — from 9°49′S 38°0′W; Sergipe — from 10°46′S 38°0′W; Bahia — for about 4 km from 11°12′S 38°0′W; Sergipe — from 11°14′S 38°0′W; Bahia — from 11°24′S 38°0′W
12°35′S 38°0′W	Atlantic Ocean	
54°0′S 38°0′W	South Georgia and the South Sandwich Islands	Island of South Georgia
54°4′S 38°0′W	Atlantic Ocean	
60°0′S 38°0′W	Southern Ocean	
77°52′S 38°0′W	Antarctica	Claimed by both Argentina (Argentine Antarctica) and United Kingdom (British Antarctic Territory)

== See also ==
- 37th meridian west
- 39th meridian west
