= 39th meridian =

39th meridian may refer to:

- 39th meridian east, a line of longitude east of the Greenwich Meridian
- 39th meridian west, a line of longitude west of the Greenwich Meridian
