= 38th meridian =

38th meridian may refer to:

- 38th meridian east, a line of longitude east of the Greenwich Meridian
- 38th meridian west, a line of longitude west of the Greenwich Meridian
