= 42nd meridian =

42nd meridian may refer to:

- 42nd meridian east, a line of longitude east of the Greenwich Meridian
- 42nd meridian west, a line of longitude west of the Greenwich Meridian
