= 41st meridian =

41st meridian may refer to:

- 41st meridian east, a line of longitude east of the Greenwich Meridian
- 41st meridian west, a line of longitude west of the Greenwich Meridian
