= Nordenskiöld Fjord =

Fjord in Greenland

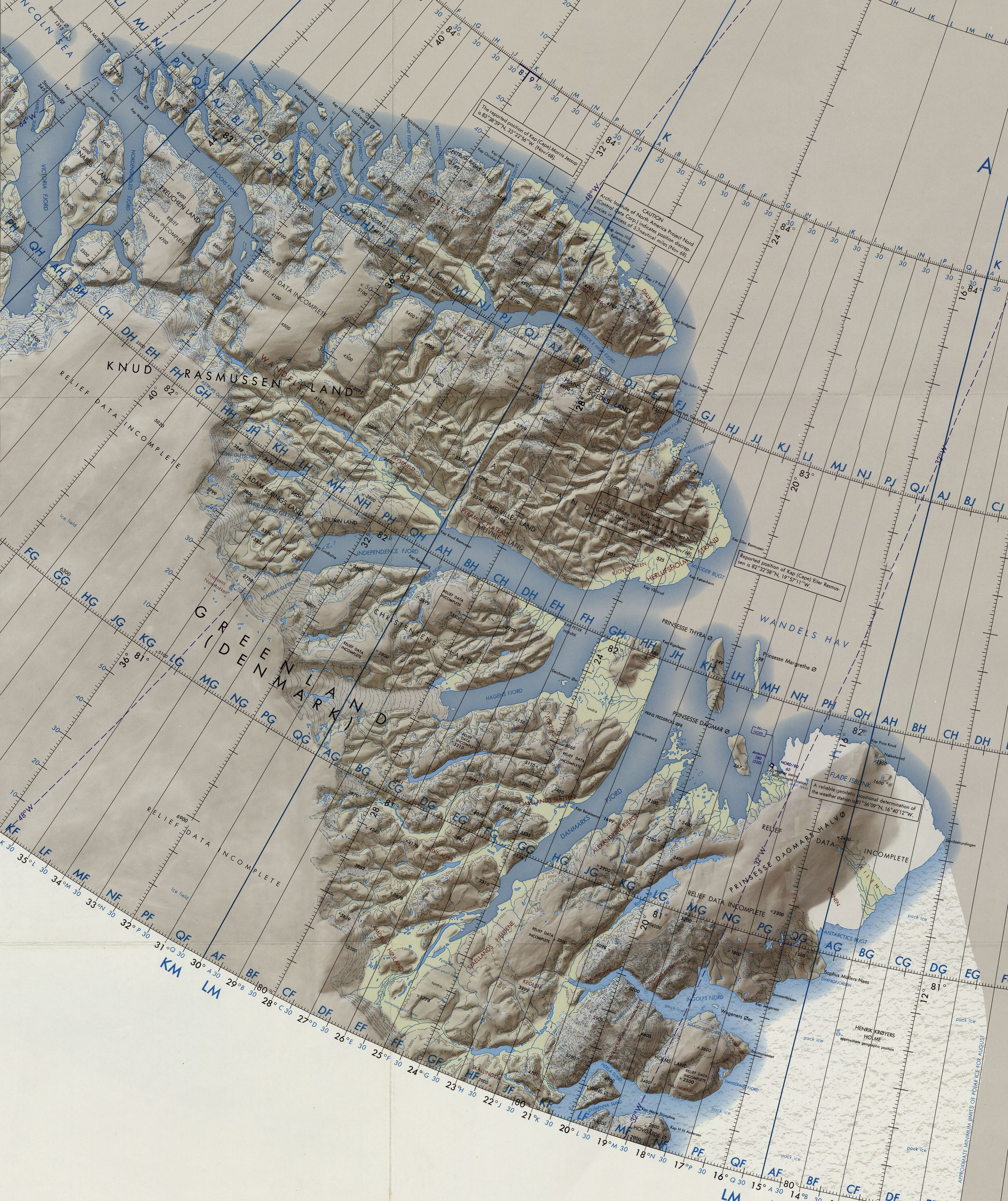
- Map of Northeastern Greenland

- Location in Greenland
- Location: Arctic
- Coordinates: 82°28′N 44°30′W
- Ocean/sea sources: Lincoln Sea
- Basin countries: Greenland

Nordenskiöld Fjord or Nordenskjöld Fjord is a fjord in Peary Land, northern Greenland.

== Geography ==
To the northwest the fjord opens into the Lincoln Sea of the Arctic Ocean. It separates the island of Nares Land, to the west of the fjord, from Freuchen Land to the east. A narrow sound between Nares Land and the mainland connects inner Nordenskiöld Fjord with Victoria Fjord. John Murray Island and Elison Island are located at its northern end off its mouth. Part of the middle and all of the inner fjord are covered by the large Jungerson Glacier.

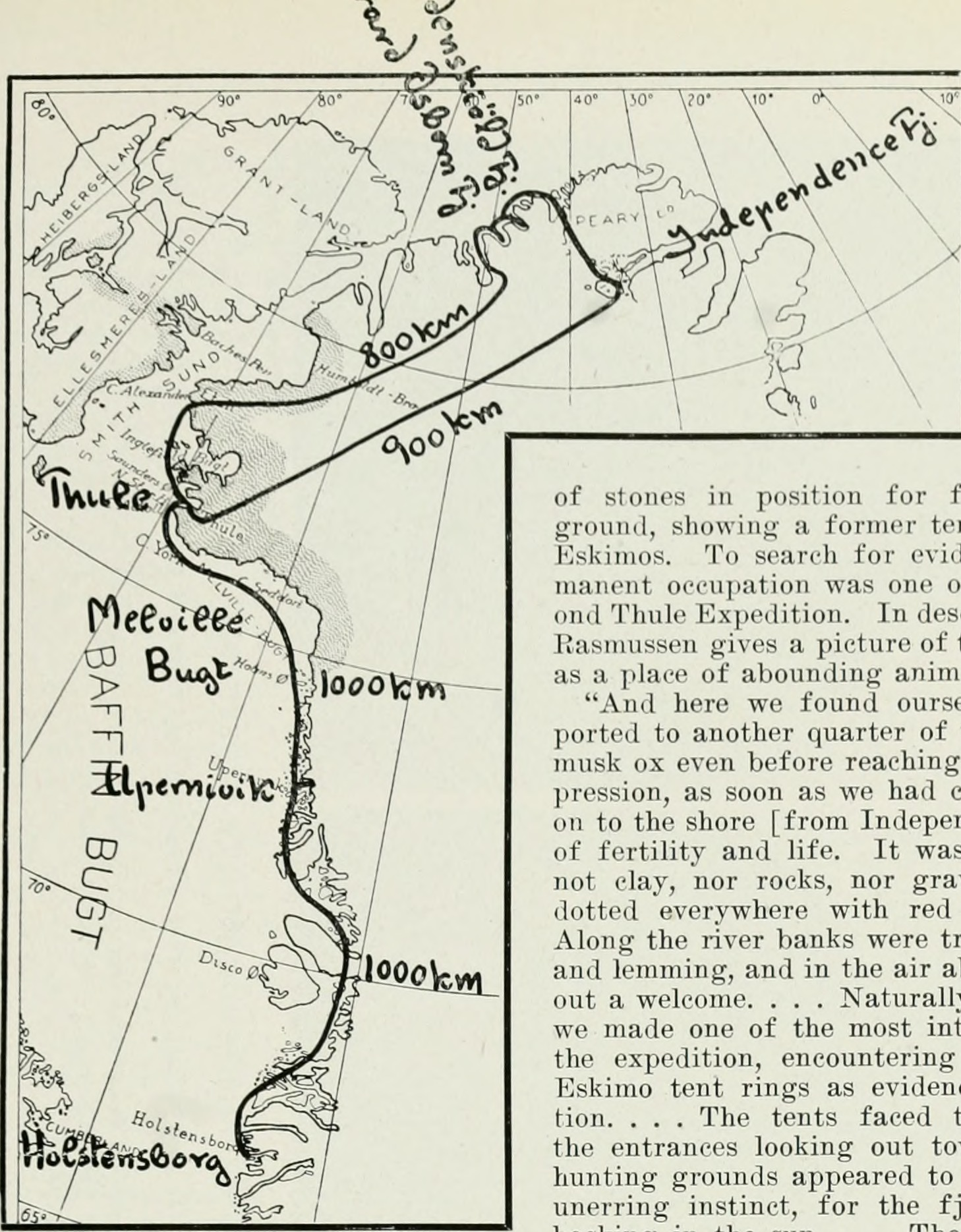
Map on which Rasmussen outlined in 1916 the intended route to Peary Land over the inland ice cap.

== See also ==
- List of fjords of Greenland
- Peary Channel (Greenland)
- Peary Land
