= Cape Verde hurricane =

Type of Atlantic hurricane

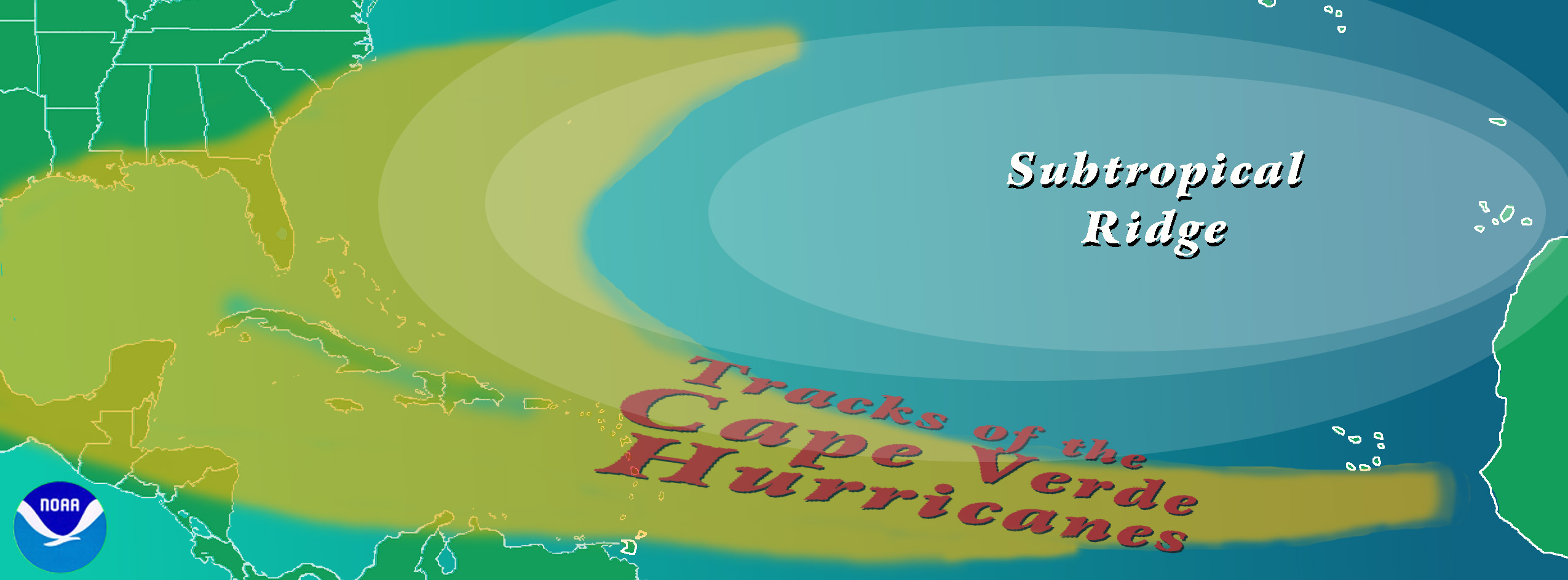
Cape Verde hurricane tracks

A Cape Verde hurricane or Cabo Verde hurricane is an Atlantic hurricane that originates at low latitude in the tropical Atlantic from a tropical wave that has passed over or near the Cape Verde islands after exiting the coast of West Africa. The average Atlantic hurricane season has about two Cape Verde hurricanes, which are often the largest and most intense storms of the season because of the large swath of warm open ocean over which to develop before encountering land or other factors prompting weakening.

A good portion of Cape Verde storms are large, and some, such as hurricanes Allen, Ivan, Dean, and Irma have set various records. Most of the longest-lived tropical cyclones in the Atlantic basin are Cape Verde hurricanes. While many move harmlessly out to sea, some move across the Caribbean Sea and into the Gulf of Mexico, becoming damaging storms for Caribbean nations, Central America, Mexico, Bermuda, the United States, and occasionally even Canada. Research projects since the 1970s have been launched to understand the formation of these storms and their movement through the main development region.

== Origin ==
Prior to the early 1940s, the term Cape Verde hurricane referred to August and early September storms that formed to the east of the surface plotting charts in use at the time. Cape Verde hurricanes typically develop from tropical waves which form in the African savanna during the wet season, then move into the African steppes. The disturbances move off the western coast of Africa and become tropical cyclones soon after moving off the coast, within 10 to 15 degrees latitude, or 1,100 kilometres (680 mi) to 1,600 kilometres (990 mi), of the Cape Verde Islands; this comprises the tropical latitudes east of the 40th meridian west.

== Research ==
Twenty nations took part in the GATE research project in 1974, where Douglas DC-6 aircraft examined tropical waves which spawned Cape Verde hurricanes. In 2006, there was a two-month research project known as NAMMA-06 (short for NASA African Monsoon Multidisciplinary Activities) which flew Douglas DC-8s into seedling disturbances in the eastern Atlantic which had the potential to become Cape Verde hurricanes.

== See also ==
- Tropical cyclogenesis
- Saharan air layer - dust aerosols blown from Africa that mitigates Atlantic hurricane formation
