= 140th meridian =

140th meridian may refer to:

- 140th meridian east, a line of longitude east of the Greenwich Meridian
- 140th meridian west, a line of longitude west of the Greenwich Meridian

140th meridian west	140th meridian east
