= Peary Channel (Greenland) =

Hypothetical channel in Greenland

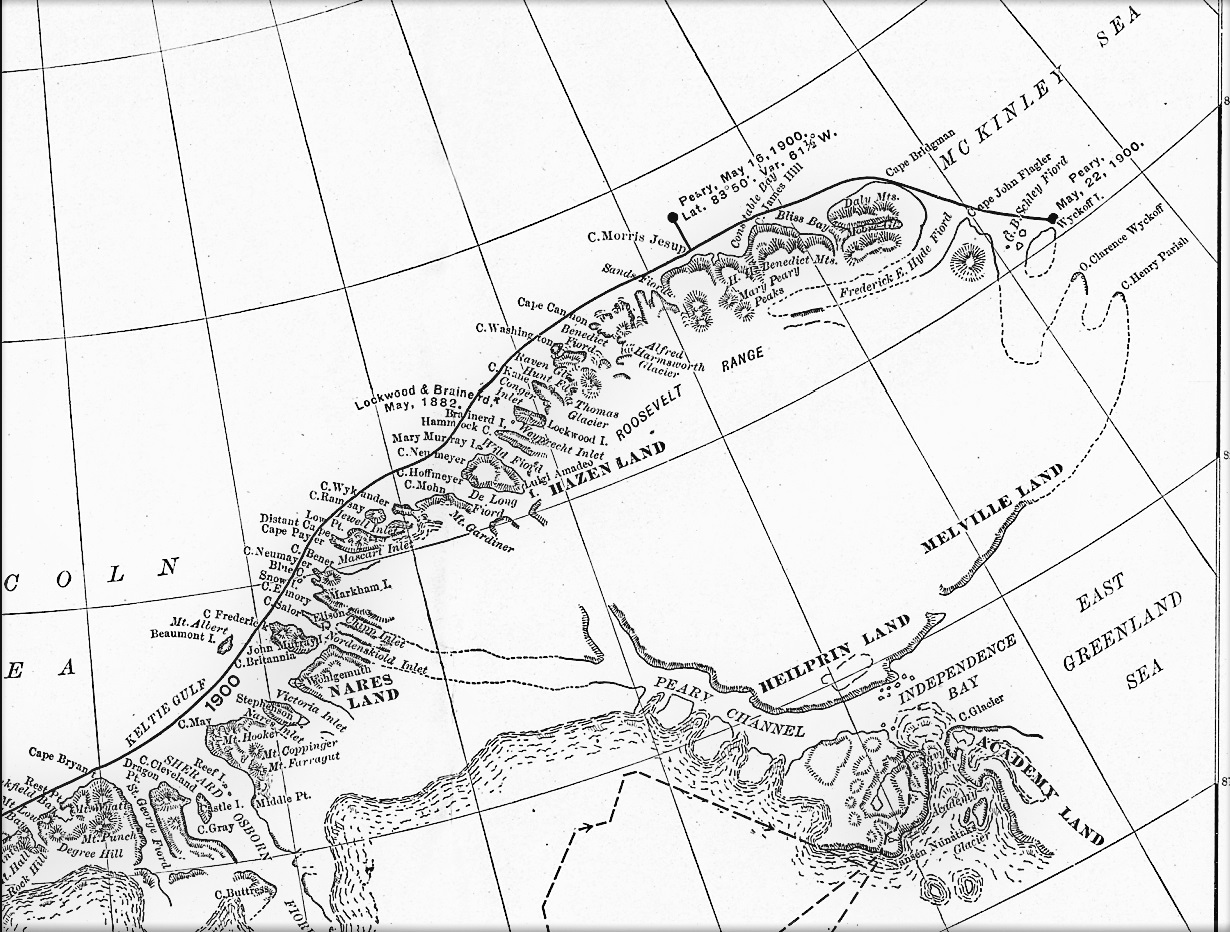
- Robert Peary's 1903 Northern Greenland map section showing the Peary Channel and the geographical features he named in the area.
- Created by: Robert E. Peary in 1892

In-universe information
- Type: Sound
- Locations: Nordenskiöld Fjord (Lincoln Sea); Independence Fjord (Wandel Sea)

The Peary Channel (Danish: Peary-kanal) was a hypothetical sound or marine channel running from east to west separating Peary Land in northernmost Greenland from the mainland further south.

The assumed existence of this channel and other errors in Peary's maps reportedly caused the tragic loss of the leading team of the Denmark expedition to Greenland's Northeast Coast 1906–1908.

== Geography ==
Robert Peary based his mapping of the area on observations he made in 1892 from Navy Cliff, located north of the Academy Glacier. From his perspective the channel allegedly connected the head of Independence Fjord in the east with the heads of Nordenskiöld Fjord and a parallel and misplaced "Chipp Inlet" in the west. There is a Chipp Sound that separates Sverdrup Island from smaller Elison Island, but it is located at the other end of Nordenskiöld Fjord, beyond its mouth.

In Peary's map Independence Fjord was merely a short bay and further to the east Peary had drawn the coast of hypothetical "Academy Land" slanting southeastwards with the "East Greenland Sea" to the north.

In the wake of the tragic outcome of the Denmark expedition's main team, many scholars were highly critical of Peary's cartographic errors, but Lauge Koch, who made detailed surveys of the area in the 1920s and 30s, took a more lenient view:

I would emphasize the high quality of Peary's sketch map, and the justification of his assumption of the insularity of the land he discovered — land which now properly bears his name.

Map of Northern Ellesmere Island and far Northern Greenland.

== History ==
In 1907 Ludvig Mylius-Erichsen (1872–1907), the ill-fated leader of the Denmark expedition, searched in vain for the Peary Channel and was misled to his death by existing maps. Two years later Ejnar Mikkelsen (1880–1971), leader of the Alabama expedition, assumed that the channel existed, until he found Mylius-Erichsen's report in a cairn at the head of Danmark Fjord, where Mylius-Erichsen had written emphatically that:

... the Peary Channel does not exist.

Finally Knud Rasmussen, during his First Thule Expedition, also realized in 1912 that Peary Land is a peninsula and corrections were made in the maps of northernmost Greenland printed after that date.

Not knowing about the non-existence of the Peary Channel beforehand, the leaders of these three expeditions had planned eventually to use the Peary Channel to reach the NW coast of Greenland for their return journey. Since 1892 it had taken a full twenty years after being put on the map to confirm that the Peary Channel had been a cartographic error.
