= 40th meridian =

40th meridian may refer to:

- 40th meridian east, a line of longitude east of the Greenwich Meridian
- 40th meridian west, a line of longitude west of the Greenwich Meridian
