= O.B. Bøggild Fjord =

Fjord in North Greenland

- O.B. Bøggilds Fjord
- Map of Northern Ellesmere Island and far Northern Greenland

- Location in Greenland
- Location: Arctic
- Coordinates: 83°00′N 38°29′W
- River sources: unnamed river
- Ocean/sea sources: De Long Fjord; Lincoln Sea
- Basin countries: Greenland
- Max. length: 22 km (14 mi)
- Max. width: 3.5 km (2.2 mi)
- Frozen: all year round
- Settlements: none

O.B. Bøggild Fjord (Danish: O.B. Bøggilds Fjord) is a fjord in Peary Land, far northern Greenland.

The fjord was first sighted in June 1917 by Knud Rasmussen and Lauge Koch from the top of Thule Mountain which rises in Hazenland above the shore of De Long Fjord. Rasmussen named it after Danish mineralogist Ove Balthasar Bøggild (1872-1956), a member of the Scientific Committee of the 1916-1918 Second Thule Expedition.

== Geography ==
O.B. Bøggild Fjord is the most easterly offshoot of the three fjords in the inner part of the De Long Fjord system. Its northern shore forms the southern limit of Amundsen Land. To the south lies the Hans Tausen Ice Cap from which some glaciers flow into its southern shore. The fjord is roughly oriented in an east / west direction and is over 20 km (12 mi) in length. Cape Holger Danske is the headland to the north of the mouth of the fjord, and Cape Bopa the one to the south, at the northern end of the Adolf Jensen Fjord.

At the head of the fjord lies the western mouth of the Nordpasset, extending 25 km (16 mi) in a ESE direction to the head of Frederick E. Hyde Fjord.

== See also ==
- Cartographic expeditions to Greenland
- List of fjords of Greenland
