= Cape Kane =

Headland in northern Greenland

Cape Kane Kap Kane
- Cape
- Map of part of Ellesmere Island and far Northern Greenland

- Coordinates: 83°29′N 39°10′W
- Location: Peary Land, Greenland
- Offshore water bodies: Conger Sound; Lincoln Sea; Hunt Fjord
- Elevation: 650 m (2,130 ft)

Cape Kane (Danish: Kap Kane) is a headland in North Greenland. Administratively it belongs to the Northeast Greenland National Park.

Cape Kane was named after Arctic explorer Elisha Kent Kane (1820 – 1857) at the time that it was the nearest land to the North Pole that had been put on the map.

== Geography ==
Cape Kane is a rocky headland located 14.5 km (9.0 mi) west of Cape Washington, northeast of Conger Sound and off the western side of the mouth of Hunt Fjord. Hunt Fjord is under the influence of slow-moving glaciers discharging on both sides of Cape Kane that completely fill it and partially clog neighboring Conger Sound as well.

Cape Kane is the westernmost point of the Roosevelt Land Peninsula. Cape Christiansen is the headland on the other side of Conger Sound, at the northern end of Lockwood Island.

== See also ==
- Peary Land
