= Nordpasset =

Valley in Peary Land, Greenland

- ONC map of Northern Ellesmere Island and far Northern Greenland

- Location within Greenland
- Floor elevation: 170 m (560 ft) to 1 m (3.3 ft)
- Length: 25 km (16 mi)

Geography
- Location: Peary Land
- Country: Greenland
- Coordinates: 82°57′N 36°15′W
- Interactive map of Nordpasset

The Nordpasset, meaning "North Pass" in Danish, is a glacial valley in Peary Land, Greenland. Administratively, it is part of the Northeast Greenland National Park.

The valley was first mapped by Lauge Koch during his cartographic air expedition of 1938. It was explored from the ground by Danish Arctic explorer Eigil Knuth together with Greenlander Jens Geisler in 1950 in the course of the Danish Peary Land Expedition.

== Geography ==
The Nordpasset extends from the Harebugt at the head of Frederick E. Hyde Fjord for 25 km (16 mi) in a WNW direction until the head of O.B. Bøggild Fjord, part of the inner De Long Fjord complex. Its maximum elevation is 170 m (560 ft). To the north, the valley is limited by Amundsen Land. To the south lies the Hans Tausen Ice Cap from which some glaciers flow into it.

== See also ==
- Sirius Passet
