= Nansen Land =

Peninsula of Greenland

- Map of part of Ellesmere Island and far Northern Greenland.

- Location within Greenland

Geography
- Location: Peary Land, Greenland
- Coordinates: 83°0′N 43°30′W
- Adjacent to: J.P. Koch Fjord; Mascart Inlet; Lincoln Sea; De Long Fjord
- Length: 100 km (60 mi)
- Width: 50 km (31 mi)
- Highest elevation: 1,320 m (4330 ft)

Administration
- Greenland (Denmark)

Demographics
- Population: Uninhabited

Nansen Land is a peninsula in far northwestern Greenland. It is a part of the Northeast Greenland National Park.

The Greenland wolf is present in the peninsula. The northern shore facing the Lincoln sea slopes evenly and is fertile for the area, being the northernmost limit of certain plant species.

== History ==
Nansen Land was named after Arctic explorer Fridtjof Nansen (1861–1930) at the time of Knud Rasmussen's Thule expeditions.

American geologist William E. Davies called the wider range north of J.P. Koch Fjord and Frederick E. Hyde Fjord the "Nansen-Jensen Alps", with the westernmost foothills in Nansen Land, stretching past the De Long Fjord area across Roosevelt Land and the Roosevelt Range, and reaching all the way to Johannes V. Jensen Land in the east.

== Geography ==
Nansen Land is located to the northeast of Freuchen Land, east of Sverdrup Island, and west of Borup Island and Amundsen Land. The westernmost headland is Cape Payer and the northernmost headland is Cape Daugaard-Jensen, near the entrance of De Long Fjord, separated from Nansen Land by a narrow sound.

The peninsula is bounded to the west by the Mascart Sund, to the southwest by the J.P. Koch Fjord and to the east by the Brainard Sund (82°57′N 41°40′W) and Thomas Thomsen Fjord, a branch of the De Long Fjord system. The peninsula is cut by faults roughly from east to west. To the southeast lies the Hans Tausen Ice Cap and to the south the Sirius Pass, a broad valley connecting J.P. Koch Fjord in the west and Brainard Sund in the east in the area where the peninsula is attached to the mainland and its ice cap.

Northwestern Nansen Land is deeply indented on its Lincoln Sea shore. The main indentations are Jewell Fjord and Gardiner Fjord. The interior is mountainous and partly glaciated. Elevations reaching 1,320 metres (4,331 ft) are found in the central part of the peninsula.

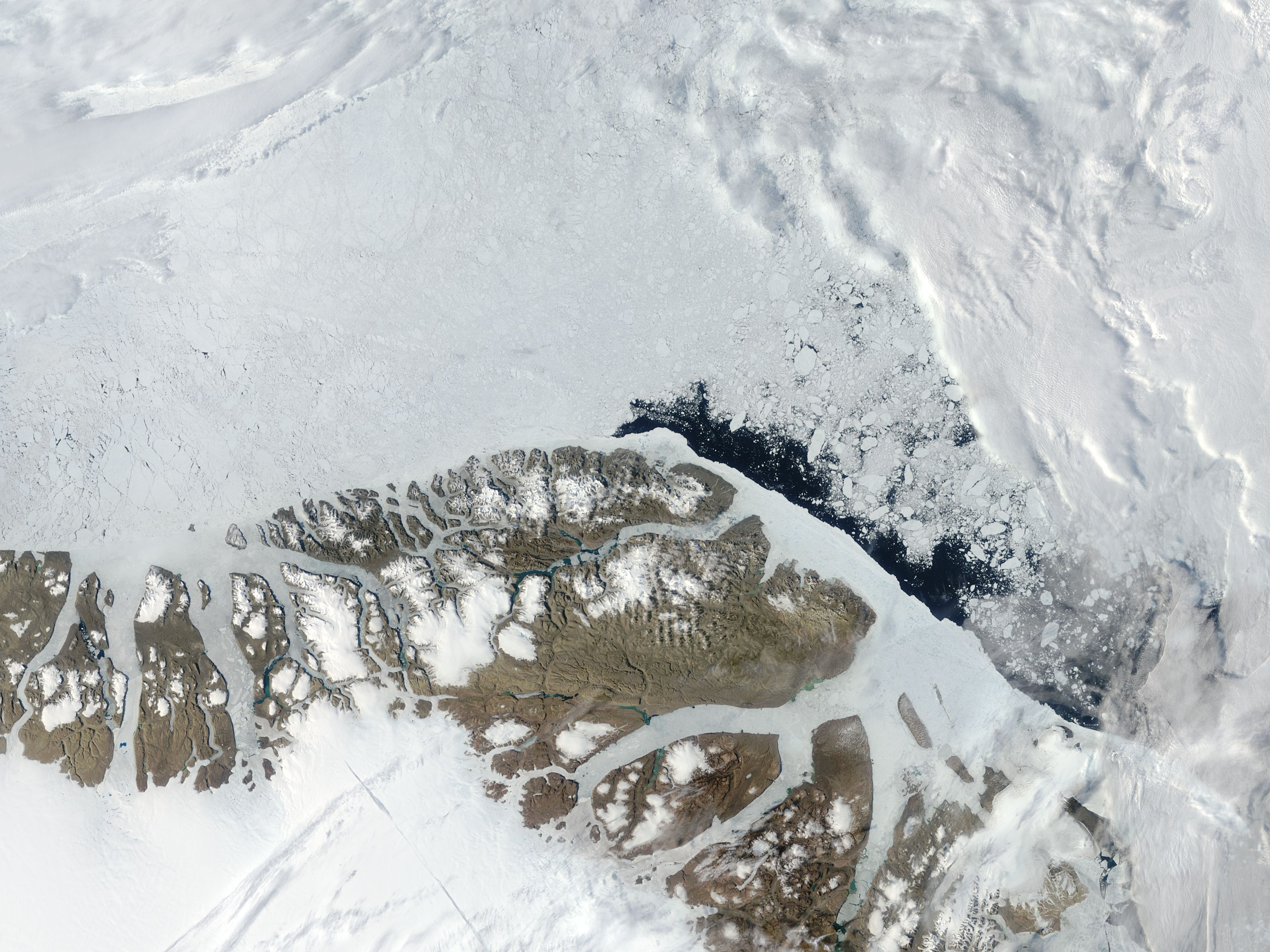
Satellite image of the northern end of Greenland.

== Bibliography ==
- H.P. Trettin (ed.), Geology of the Innuitian Orogen and Arctic Platform of Canada and Greenland. 1991

== See also ==
- Innuitian orogeny
