= Jewell Fjord =

Fjord in Peary Land, Greenland

- Location in Greenland
- Location: Arctic
- Coordinates: 83°9′N 43°30′W
- Ocean/sea sources: Lincoln Sea
- Basin countries: Greenland
- Max. length: 30 km (19 mi)
- Max. width: 5 km (3.1 mi)
- Frozen: All year round
- Settlements: Uninhabited

Jewell Fjord, also known as "Jewell Inlet", is a fjord in Peary Land, northern Greenland. To the northwest, the fjord opens into the Lincoln Sea of the Arctic Ocean. It is part of the Northeast Greenland National Park.

== History ==
The fjord is named after US Sgt. Winfield Scott Jewell (1850–1884), meteorologist and member of the ill-fated Lady Franklin Bay Expedition led by Arctic explorer Lt. Adolphus Greely. Jewell died of starvation and exposure during the expedition. His body was later recovered.

== Geography ==
Jewell Fjord opens to the northwest to the Lincoln Sea on the shore of Nansen Land, southwest of Gardiner Fjord and northeast of Mascart Sound. Its mouth is located to the east of Distant Cape and west of Low Pynt. There are three glaciers discharging at its head. The sea in the area is almost permanently covered by ice.

Map of Northern Ellesmere Island and far Northern Greenland.

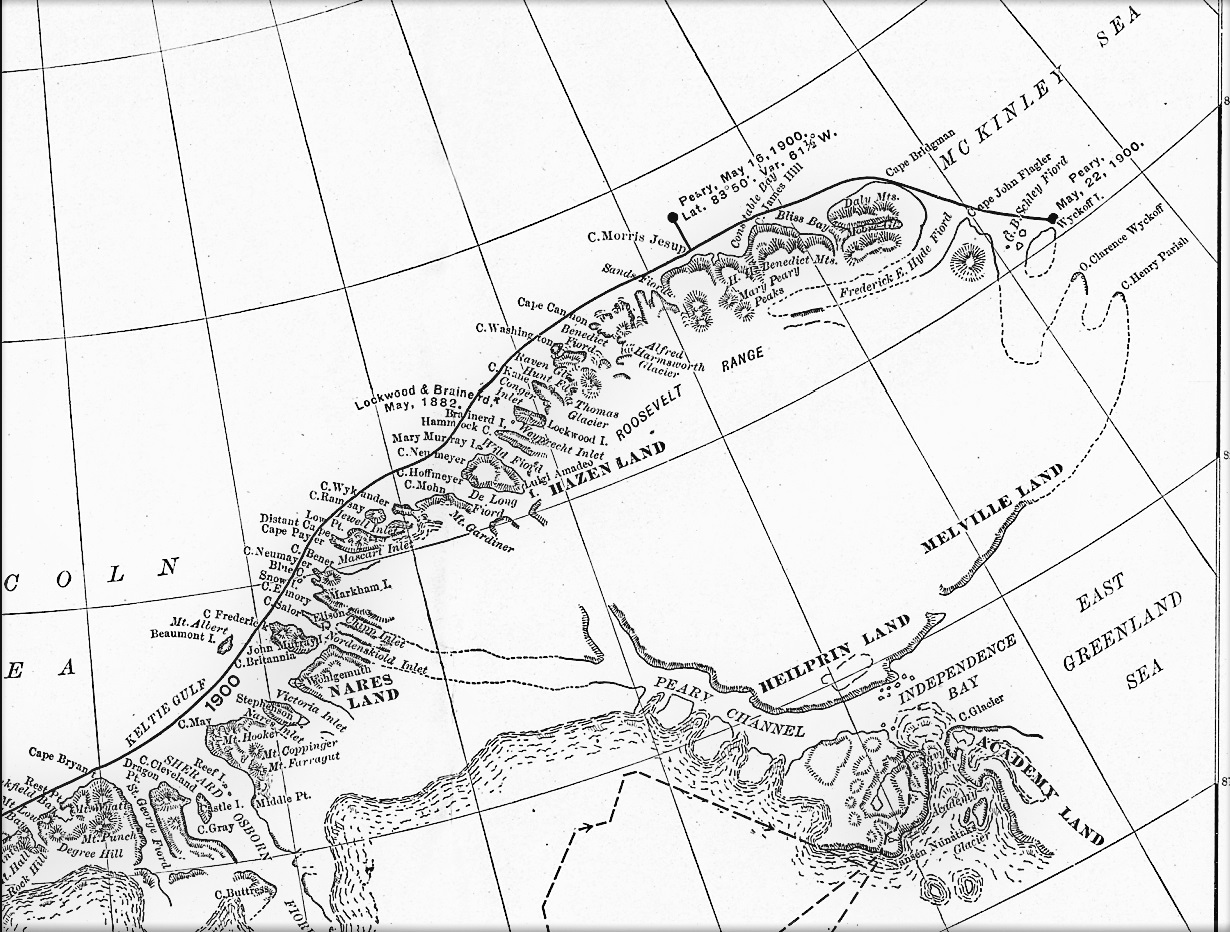
Robert Peary's 1903 Northern Greenland map section showing "Jewell Inlet".

== See also ==
- List of fjords of Greenland
- Peary Land
