= 138th meridian east =

Line of longitude

138th meridian east (interactive map)

In Australia, the meridian approximately defines the border between the Northern Territory and Queensland.

The meridian 138° east of Greenwich is a line of longitude that extends from the North Pole across the Arctic Ocean, Asia, the Pacific Ocean, Australasia, the Indian Ocean, the Southern Ocean, and Antarctica to the South Pole.

The 138th meridian east forms a great circle with the 42nd meridian west.

In Australia, the border between the Northern Territory and Queensland approximates the meridian. The border runs north from Poeppel Corner at a bearing of 359° 59' 30", reaching the Gulf of Carpentaria several hundred meters west of the meridian.

== From Pole to Pole ==
Starting at the North Pole and heading south to the South Pole, the 138th meridian east passes through:

Co-ordinates	Country, territory or sea	Notes
90°0′N 138°0′E	Arctic Ocean	
76°0′N 138°0′E	Russia	Sakha Republic — Kotelny Island, New Siberian Islands
74°51′N 138°0′E	Laptev Sea	
71°33′N 138°0′E	Russia	Sakha Republic — Yarok Island and the mainland Khabarovsk Krai — from 59°49′N 138°0′E
56°23′N 138°0′E	Sea of Okhotsk	
55°5′N 138°0′E	Russia	Khabarovsk Krai — Bolshoy Shantar Island
54°46′N 138°0′E	Sea of Okhotsk	
53°37′N 138°0′E	Russia	Khabarovsk Krai; Primorsky Krai — from 48°18′N 138°0′E; Khabarovsk Krai — from 47°41′N 138°0′E; Primorsky Krai — from 47°38′N 138°0′E; Khabarovsk Krai — from 47°36′N 138°0′E; Primorsky Krai — from 47°28′N 138°0′E
46°8′N 138°0′E	Sea of Japan	Passing just west of Sado island, Niigata Prefecture, Japan (at 37°49′N 138°12′E)
37°7′N 138°0′E	Japan	Island of Honshū — Niigata Prefecture — Nagano Prefecture — from 36°54′N 138°0′E (passing just east of Matsumoto city) — Shizuoka Prefecture — from 35°17′N 138°0′E (passing through Kakegawa city)
34°40′N 138°0′E	Pacific Ocean	Passing just west of Yap island, Federated States of Micronesia (at 9°27′N 138°3′E)
1°33′S 138°0′E	Indonesia	Island of New Guinea
5°29′S 138°0′E	Arafura Sea	
7°43′S 138°0′E	Indonesia	Island of Yos Sudarso
8°24′S 138°0′E	Arafura Sea	
12°1′S 138°0′E	Gulf of Carpentaria	
16°33′S 138°0′E	Australia	Northern Territory / Queensland border (approximately); South Australia — from 26°0′S 138°0′E, passing through Port Pirie (at 33°11′S 138°0′E)
34°21′S 138°0′E	Gulf St Vincent	
35°44′S 138°0′E	Australia	South Australia — Kangaroo Island
35°54′S 138°0′E	Indian Ocean	Australian authorities consider this to be part of the Southern Ocean
60°0′S 138°0′E	Southern Ocean	
66°29′S 138°0′E	Antarctica	Adélie Land, claimed by France

== See also ==
- 137th meridian east
- 139th meridian east
