= De Long Fjord =

Fjord in Greenland

- Location in Greenland
- Location: Arctic
- Coordinates: 83°12′N 41°0′W
- Ocean/sea sources: Lincoln Sea
- Basin countries: Greenland
- Max. length: 60 km (37 mi)
- Max. width: 6 km (3.7 mi)
- Frozen: All year round
- Settlements: Uninhabited

De Long Fjord is a fjord system in Peary Land, northern Greenland. To the northwest, the fjord opens into the Lincoln Sea of the Arctic Ocean. It is part of the Northeast Greenland National Park.

The fjord was named after Arctic explorer George W. De Long during the Lady Franklin Bay Expedition from 1881 to 1884.

== Geography ==
De Long Fjord opens to the northwest east of Nansen Land and to the west of Weyprecht Fjord, separated from it by the island of Hazenland. Its mouth is located to the south of the Wild Sound and southeast of Luigi Amadeo Island and Cape Mohn, and south of Hanne Island. The Tjalfe Glacier discharges ice from the Hans Tausen Ice Cap at its head. Although the islands in the fjord, as well as the peninsula flanking it, are unglaciated, the sea in the area is permanently covered by ice.

The De Long Fjord is a fjord system with three branches separated by islands in its outer section:

- Brainard Sound in the west, between Nansen Land and Borup Island (Borup Island).
- Thomas Thomsen Fjord (Qajuuttaq), between Borup Island and MacMillan Island.
- Adolf Jensen Fjord, between the eastern end of MacMillan Island and the mainland.
- O.B. Bøggild Fjord in the inner part to the southeast, south of Amundsen Land, with the Nordpasset at its head.

Map of part of Ellesmere Island and far Northern Greenland.

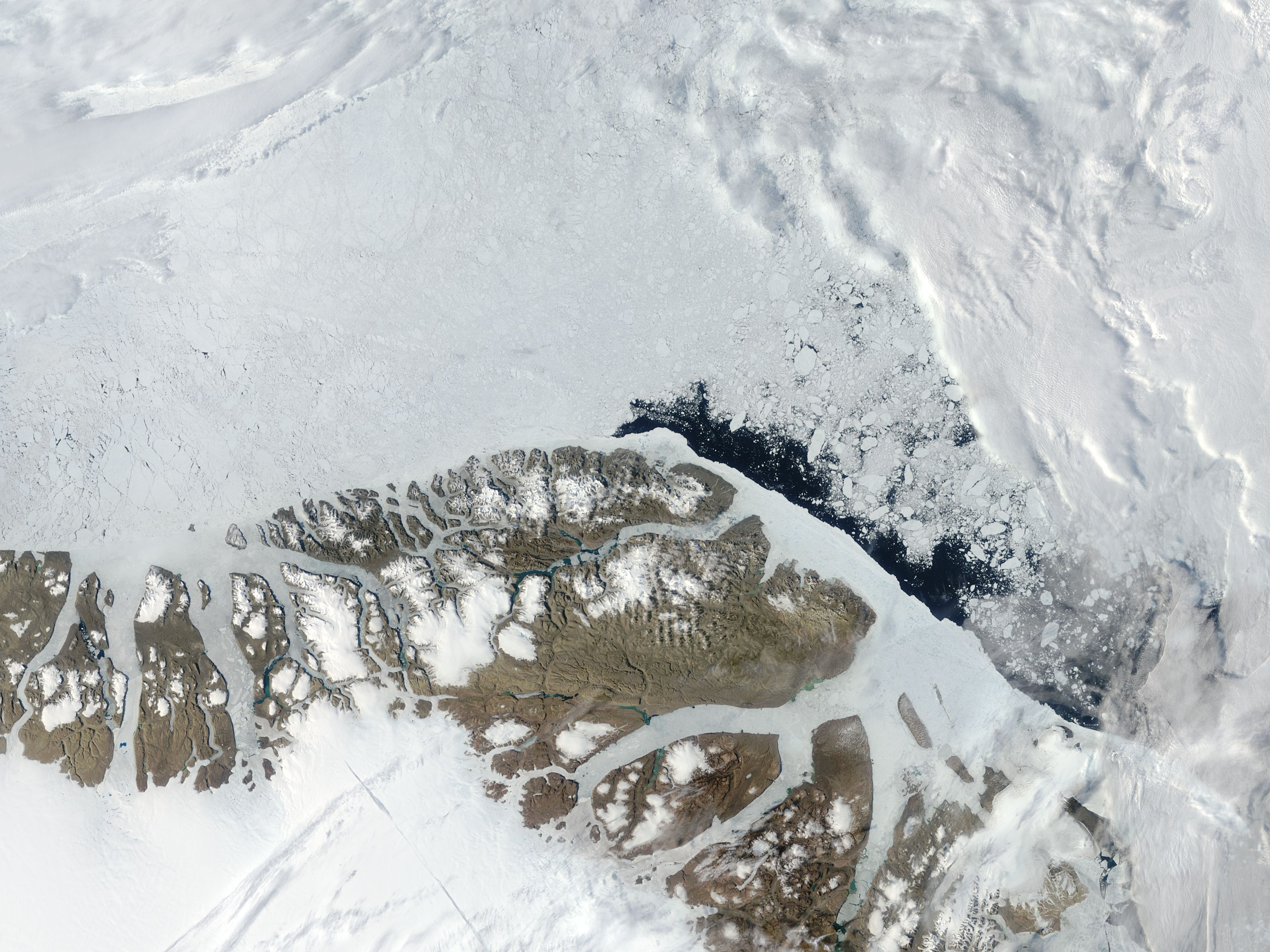
Satellite image of the northern end of Greenland.

== See also ==
- List of fjords of Greenland
- Peary Land
