= C. H. Ostenfeld Glacier =

Glacier in Greenland

- C. H. Ostenfeld Gletscher
- Location within Greenland
- Type: Tidal outlet glacier
- Location: Greenland
- Coordinates: 81°43′00″N 44°10′00″W
- Length: 50 km (31 mi)
- Width: 8 km (5.0 mi)
- Thickness: 93 m (305 ft)
- Terminus: Victoria Fjord; Lincoln Sea

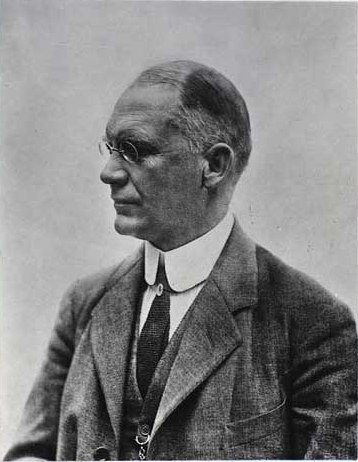
Carl Hansen Ostenfeld (1873–1931) who the glacier is named after

C. H. Ostenfeld Glacier (Danish: C. H. Ostenfeld Gletscher) is one of the major glaciers in northern Greenland, originating from the Greenland Ice Sheet. Its catchment area covers nearly 14 500 km^{2}, or about 1.2% of Greenland’s entire ice sheet surface. If all that ice were to melt, it would raise global sea levels by an estimated 3.9 centimeters.

This glacier was first mapped by Lauge Koch in 1917 during Knud Rasmussen's 1916-1918 Second Thule Expedition to north Greenland and was named after Danish botanist Carl Hansen Ostenfeld (1873–1931), author of Flora of Greenland and its origin.

== Geography ==
The C. H. Ostenfeld Glacier originates from the North-Central sector of the Greenland Ice Sheet, at around 81.6 N, 45.2W. It is roughly southeast–northwest oriented and drains into Victoria Fjord, moving about 2.3 cubic kilometers of ice into the ocean each year — making it the largest single contributor to the total ice and freshwater discharge to the fjord. Ice at the glacier’s grounding line, where the glacier ice meets the fjord's seawater and forms a floating ice tongue, flows at about 770–800 meters per year, a speed comparable to other nearby giants such as Ryder and Petermann Glaciers.

The glacier terminus is characterised by the presence of three nunataks close to the grounding line. Two smaller glaciers, Harder and Brikkerne Glaciers, also drain into Victoria Fjord near C. H. Ostenfeld Glacier. Though they originate from a separate dome of ice, their tongues once merged with C. H. Ostenfeld's, effectively creating a shared floating front.

Map of part of Ellesmere Island and far Northern Greenland.

== Recent advances and retreats ==
Although the C.H. Ostenfeld Glacier is one of North Greenland’s major outlets in both size and ice flow, its past behavior is still poorly understood. Its remote location has made long-term monitoring extremely difficult, and most of current knowledge comes from satellite images collected only in recent decades. These modern observations reveal a glacier that has not changed steadily, but rather has alternated between periods of advance and retreat. Remarkably, there is significant scientific disagreement with regards to the magnitude of frontal position shifts over time. This uncertainty likely stems from the glacier’s ice tongue's heavily fractured surface, which makes it difficult to pinpoint the true edge of the ice front.

Aerial photographs from the late 1970s show that the glacier floating ice tongue was once stretching more than 25 kilometers into the fjord. This configuration dramatically changed in the early 2000s, when the ice tongue collapsed. In 2003 alone, C. H. Ostenfeld glacier lost about 80% of its floating extension, amounting to a total loss of roughly 27 cubic kilometers of ice compared to 1978. This was one of the earliest abrupt ice tongue collapses ever observed in North Greenland.

== Bibliography ==
- Anthony K. Higgins, North Greenland Glacier Velocities and Calf Ice Production
- A Review of Recent Changes in Major Marine-Terminating Outlet Glaciers

== See also ==
- List of glaciers in Greenland
