= Wulff Land =

Peninsula in Greenland

- Location within Greenland

Geography
- Location: NW Greenland
- Coordinates: 82°0′N 48°0′W
- Adjacent to: Sherard Osborn Fjord; Victoria Fjord
- Length: 150 km (93 mi)
- Width: 60 km (37 mi)
- Highest elevation: 1,128 m (3701 ft)

Administration
- Greenland (Denmark)

Demographics
- Population: Uninhabited

Wulff Land (Danish: Wulffs Land) is a peninsula in far northwestern Greenland. Administratively it is a part of the Northeast Greenland National Park.

== History ==
Wulff Land was named after Swedish botanist and Arctic explorer Thorild Wulff (1867–1917), who went with Knud Rasmussen on the Second Thule Expedition and died from fatigue near Cape Agassiz in Inglefield Land in southern Peabody Bay.

The Wulff Land peninsula is a barren and inhospitable place. Unlike Peary Land to the northeast, no remains of human habitation have been found.

== Geography ==
Wulff Land is located to the northeast of Warming Land and east of Hendrik Island across the Sherard Osborn Fjord. Nares Land lies to the east, across the Victoria Fjord and Stephenson Island to the northeast. Cape May in the Lincoln Sea is its northernmost headland. To the south, the peninsula is attached to the mainland and its ice cap.

Wulff Land is a largely unglaciated and mountainous peninsula with a large firn cap, The Sven Hedin Firn, in its northern part. There are lakes with a landlocked fjord structure in the southern part where the Blue Cliffs rise above one of the lakes.

In the southwest lies Aage Bistrup Land, and west of it the Ryder Glacier, across which lies Permin Land.

Map of part of Ellesmere Island and far Northern Greenland.

== Geology ==
A number of geological formations have been defined in Wulff Land, some of which are fossil-bearing. The Wulff Land Formation, a sequence of black mudstones and fine-grained black or green siltstones, was erected by Hurst & Surlyk in 1982. Trace fossils dating back to the Silurian period have been found in the formation.

== Bibliography ==
- H.P. Trettin (ed.), Geology of the Innuitian Orogen and Arctic Platform of Canada and Greenland. Geological Survey of Canada (1991) ISBN 978-0660131313

== See also ==
- Cartographic expeditions to Greenland
