= East Jensen Island =

Island in Greenland

MacMillan Island
MacMillan Ø
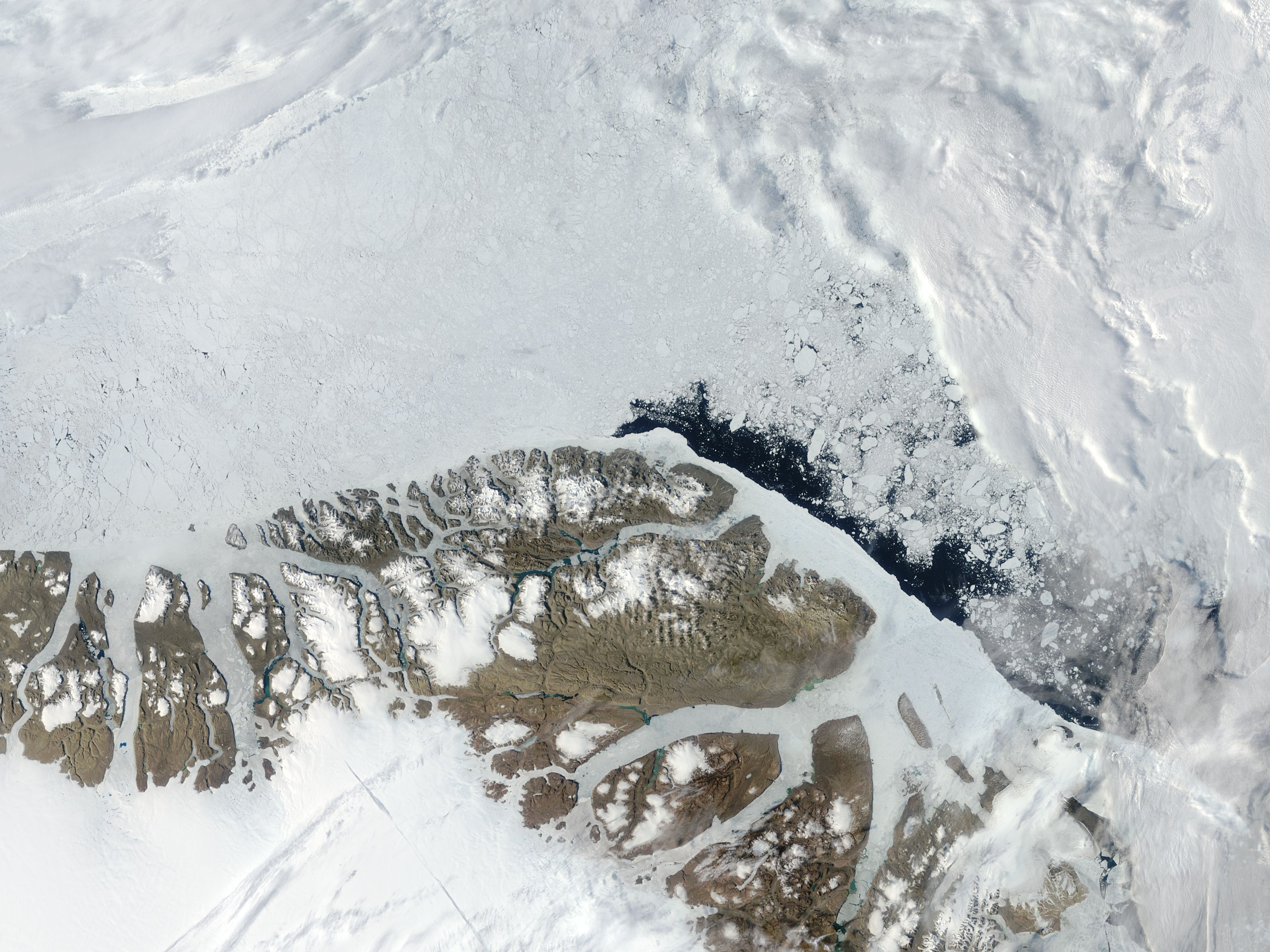
- Satellite image of the northern end of Greenland

- Location within Greenland

Geography
- Location: Lincoln Sea
- Coordinates: 83°3′N 40°36′W
- Area: 186 km^{2} (72 sq mi)
- Length: 23 km (14.3 mi)
- Width: 9 km (5.6 mi)
- Coastline: 57.2 km (35.54 mi)
- Highest elevation: 853 m (2799 ft)

Administration
- Greenland
- Zone: Northeast Greenland National Park

Demographics
- Population: 0

MacMillan Island (Danish: MacMillan Ø), also known as East Jensen Island, is an uninhabited island of the Lincoln Sea in Peary Land, far northern Greenland.

The island was formerly named after Danish zoologist Adolf Severin Jensen (1866 - 1953), professor at the University of Copenhagen, who had carried out extensive research on the fisheries of West Greenland, and who was a member of the committee of the 1931–34 Three-year Expedition (Treårsekspeditionen).

== Geography ==
East Jensen Island is located off the western side of Hazenland in the De Long Fjord. The island has an area of 163.7 km^{2} (63.2 sq mi) and a shoreline of 57.2 km (35.5 mi).

Its western shore forms the eastern side of Adolf Jensen Fjord (Qajuutaq), beyond which lies Borup Island (West Jensen Island). Small and narrow Inge Island, located at the mouth of De Long Fjord lies 3 km to the north off the northern end of East Jensen Island.

Map of Northern Ellesmere Island and far Northern Greenland.

== See also ==
- List of islands of Greenland
