= Borup Island =

Island in Greenland

Borup Ø
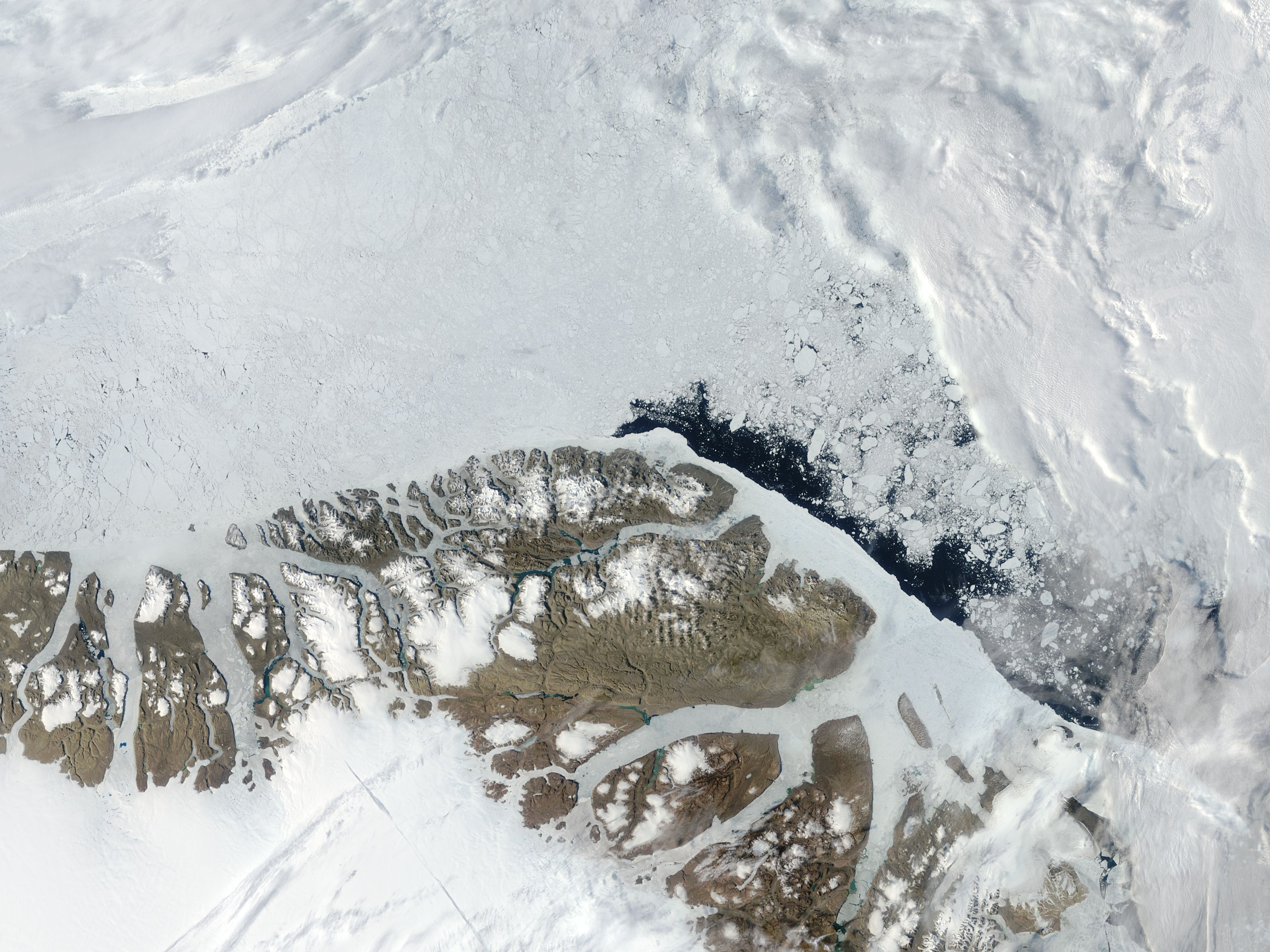
- Satellite image of the northern end of Greenland

- Location of Borup Island in Greenland
- Interactive map of Borup Island

Geography
- Location: Lincoln Sea
- Coordinates: 83°2′N 41°23′W
- Area: 183 km^{2} (71 sq mi)
- Length: 30 km (19 mi)
- Width: 7 km (4.3 mi)
- Coastline: 68.2 km (42.38 mi)
- Highest elevation: 945 m (3100 ft)

Administration
- Greenland
- Zone: Northeast Greenland National Park

Demographics
- Population: 0

Borup Island (Danish: Borup Ø), also known as West Jensen Island, is an uninhabited island of the Lincoln Sea in Peary Land, far northern Greenland. The island is named after George Borup, an American explorer.

The island was formerly named after Danish zoologist Adolf Severin Jensen (1866 - 1953), professor at the University of Copenhagen, who had carried out extensive research on the fisheries of West Greenland, and who was a member of the committee of the 1931–34 Three-year Expedition (Treårsekspeditionen)

== Geography ==
It is a long island off the western side of the Nansen Land Peninsula on the other side of the Thomas Thomsen Fjord, part of the De Long Fjord system. Its eastern shore forms the western side of Adolf Jensen Fjord (Qajuutaq) beyond which lies slightly larger MacMillan Island. Smaller Hanne Island lies 3 km to the north. East Jensen Island has an area of 161.4 km^{2} (62.3 sq mi) and a shoreline of 68.2 km (42.4 mi).

Map of Northern Ellesmere Island and far Northern Greenland.

== See also ==
- List of islands of Greenland
