= 139th meridian east =

Line of longitude

139th meridian east (interactive map)

The meridian 139° east of Greenwich is a line of longitude that extends from the North Pole across the Arctic Ocean, Asia, the Pacific Ocean, Australasia, the Indian Ocean, the Southern Ocean, and Antarctica to the South Pole.

The 139th meridian east forms a great circle with the 41st meridian west.

== From Pole to Pole ==
Starting at the North Pole and heading south to the South Pole, the 139th meridian east passes through:

Co-ordinates	Country, territory or sea	Notes
90°0′N 139°0′E	Arctic Ocean	
76°12′N 139°0′E	Russia	Sakha Republic — Kotelny Island, New Siberian Islands
74°39′N 139°0′E	Laptev Sea	
71°35′N 139°0′E	Russia	Sakha Republic; Khabarovsk Krai — from 61°20′N 139°0′E
57°9′N 139°0′E	Sea of Okhotsk	
54°13′N 139°0′E	Russia	Khabarovsk Krai
47°21′N 139°0′E	Sea of Japan	
37°54′N 139°0′E	Japan	Island of Honshū — Niigata Prefecture (passing just west of Niigata city center) — Gunma Prefecture — from 36°59′N 139°0′E (passing through Takasaki city center) — Saitama Prefecture — from 36°8′N 139°0′E — Tokyo Prefecture — from 35°53′N 139°0′E — Yamanashi Prefecture — from 35°45′N 139°0′E — Kanagawa Prefecture — from 35°28′N 139°0′E — Shizuoka Prefecture — from 35°24′N 139°0′E — Kanagawa Prefecture — from 35°17′N 139°0′E — Shizuoka Prefecture — from 35°11′N 139°0′E
34°43′N 139°0′E	Pacific Ocean	Passing just west of the island of Kōzushima, Tokyo Prefecture, Japan (at 34°11′N 139°7′E)
1°58′S 139°0′E	Indonesia	Islands of New Guinea, Yos Sudarso and New Guinea again
8°12′S 139°0′E	Arafura Sea	
11°42′S 139°0′E	Gulf of Carpentaria	Passing just west of Mornington Island, Australia (at 16°38′S 139°9′E)
16°53′S 139°0′E	Australia	Queensland; South Australia — from 26°0′N 139°0′E
35°37′S 139°0′E	Indian Ocean	Australian authorities consider this to be part of the Southern Ocean
60°0′S 139°0′E	Southern Ocean	
66°33′S 139°0′E	Antarctica	Adélie Land, claimed by France

== See also ==
- 138th meridian east
- 140th meridian east
