= Academy Glacier (Greenland) =

Glacier in Greenland

- Academy Gletscher
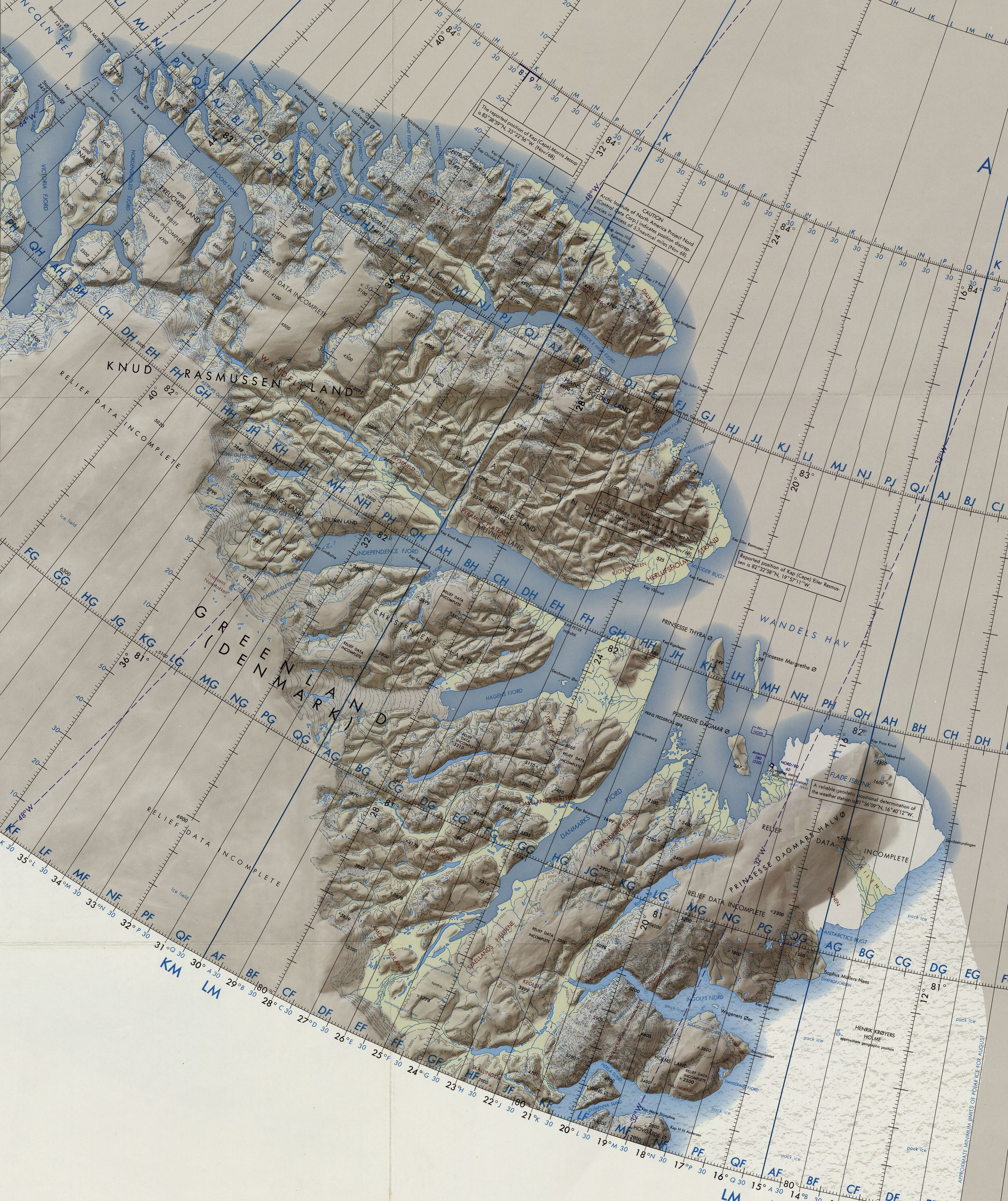
- Map of Far Northeastern Greenland.

- Location within Greenland
- Type: Tidal outlet glacier
- Location: Greenland
- Coordinates: 81°30′N 32°39′W
- Length: c. 40 km (25 mi)
- Width: 8.5 km (5.3 mi)
- Thickness: 120 m (390 ft)
- Terminus: Independence Fjord; Arctic Ocean

Academy Glacier (Danish: Academy Gletscher or Academy Brae), is one of the major glaciers in northern Greenland.

It was named in 1892 after the Academy of Natural Sciences in Philadelphia by Robert Peary during his expedition to north Greenland.

This glacier forms the geographical limit between Peary Land and King Frederick VIII Land.

== Geography ==
The Academy Glacier is roughly northeast–southwest oriented and has its terminus at the head of the Independence Fjord. Navy Cliff rises north of the last stretch of the fjord beyond which lies the smaller Marie Sophie Glacier. J.C. Christensen Land lies to the east and Vildtland lies to the northwest. Gletscher Cape is a headland located east of the glacier terminus.

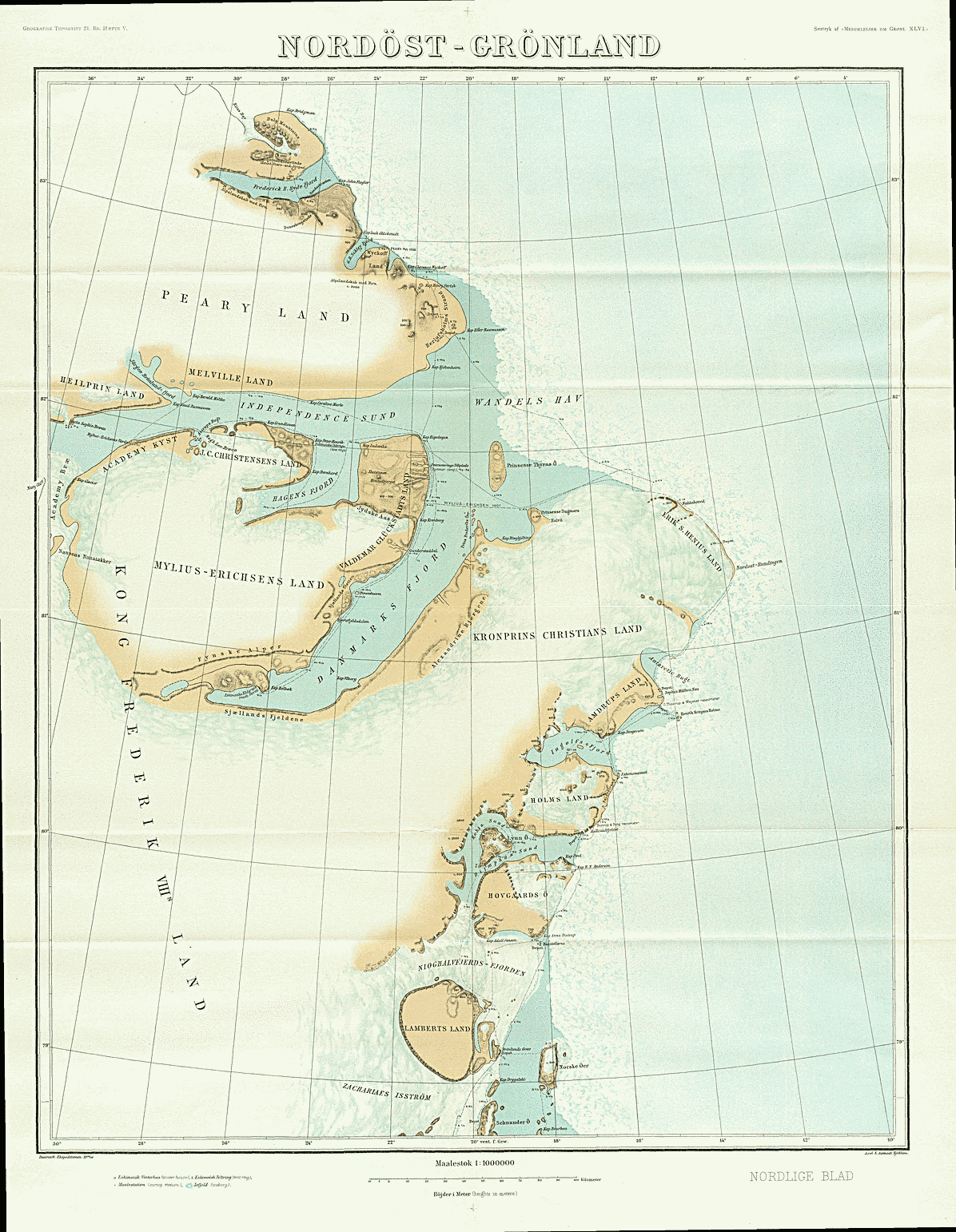
J. P. Koch's 1911 map of NE Greenland showing Academy Brae and the southern inner shore of Independence Fjord as Academy Kyst.

== See also ==
- List of glaciers in Greenland
- Cartographic expeditions to Greenland
- Peary Channel
