= Conger Sound =

Fjord in Peary Land, Greenland

- Conger Sund
- Map of Northern Ellesmere Island and far Northern Greenland

- Location in Greenland
- Location: Arctic
- Coordinates: 83°25′N 39°40′W
- Ocean/sea sources: Weyprecht Fjord; Lincoln Sea
- Basin countries: Greenland
- Max. length: 22 km (14 mi)
- Max. width: 4 km (2.5 mi)
- Frozen: all year round
- Settlements: none

Conger Sound (Danish: Conger Sund), also known as Conger Inlet, is a fjord in Peary Land, far northern Greenland.

The sound was first put on the map at the time of the Lady Franklin Bay Expedition led by Adolphus Greely. It was named after U.S. Senator Omar D. Conger, a sponsor of the venture.

== Geography ==
Conger Sound is a marine channel with a fjord structure, It is part of the Weyprecht Fjord system, extending for over 22 km (14 mi) in a roughly north / south direction to the east of Lockwood Island and west of Roosevelt Land.

It opens to the frozen Lincoln Sea in the north, between Cape Kane in the east and Cape Christiansen in the west. To the south it opens to the inner section of Weyprecht Fjord.

== See also ==
- List of fjords of Greenland
