= Stephenson Island (Greenland) =

Island in Greenland

- Location within Greenland

Geography
- Location: Greenland
- Coordinates: 82°30′N 48°30′W
- Total islands: 1
- Length: 20 km (12 mi)
- Width: 7 km (4.3 mi)
- Highest elevation: 303 m (994 ft)

Administration
- Greenland

Demographics
- Population: 0

Stephenson Island (Danish: Stephenson Ø) is a small, uninhabited island in the Victoria Fjord of the Lincoln Sea, which is part of the Arctic Ocean. It is located off of the northern shore of Avannaa county, Greenland, between the island Nares Land 13 km to the east and the peninsula Wulff Land 6 km to the west.

== Illustrations ==
Map of part of Ellesmere Island and far Northern Greenland.

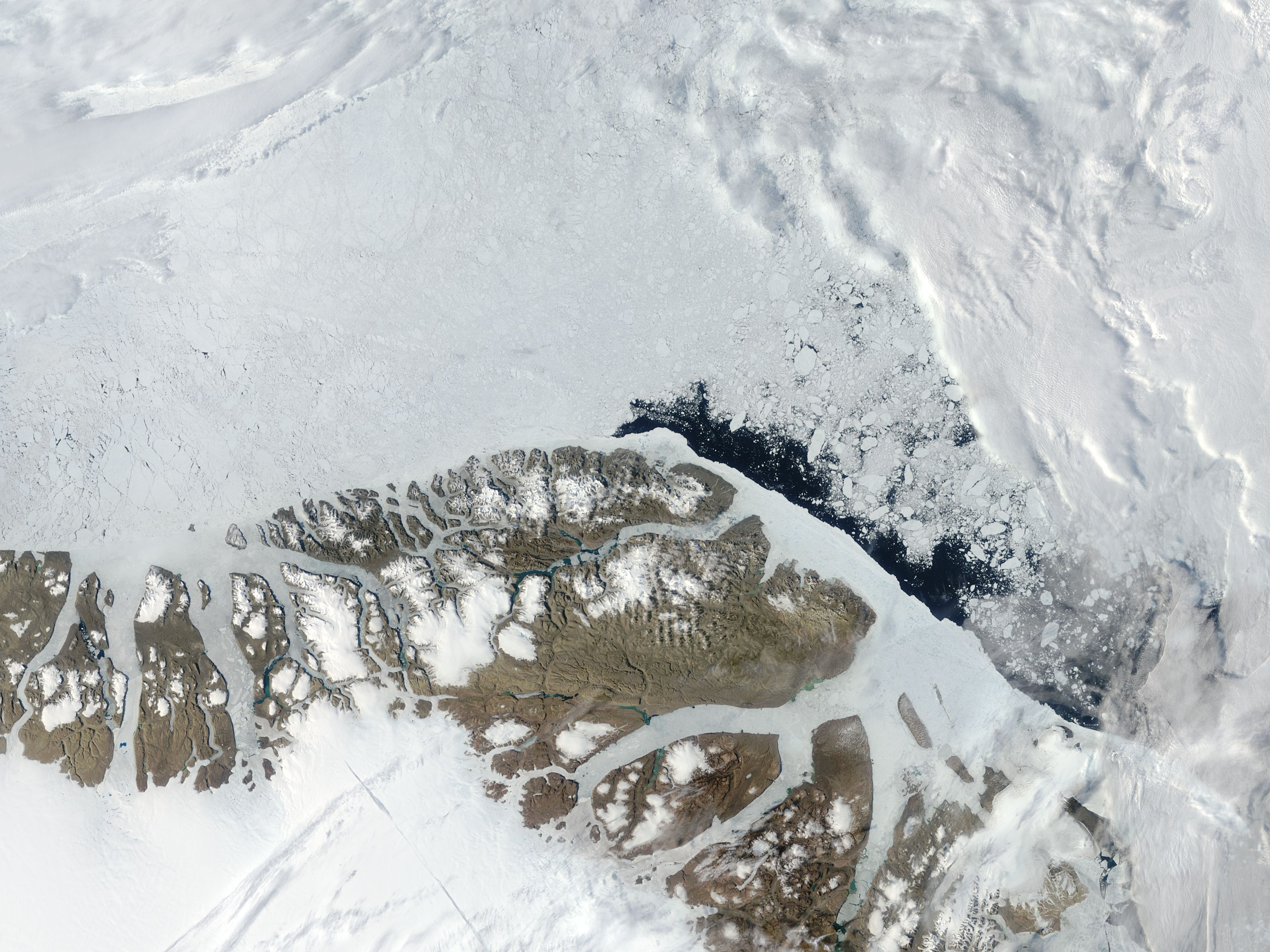
MODIS Satellite Image of Northern Greenland

== See also ==
- List of islands of Greenland
