= Hazenland =

Island in northern Greenland

Hazen Land
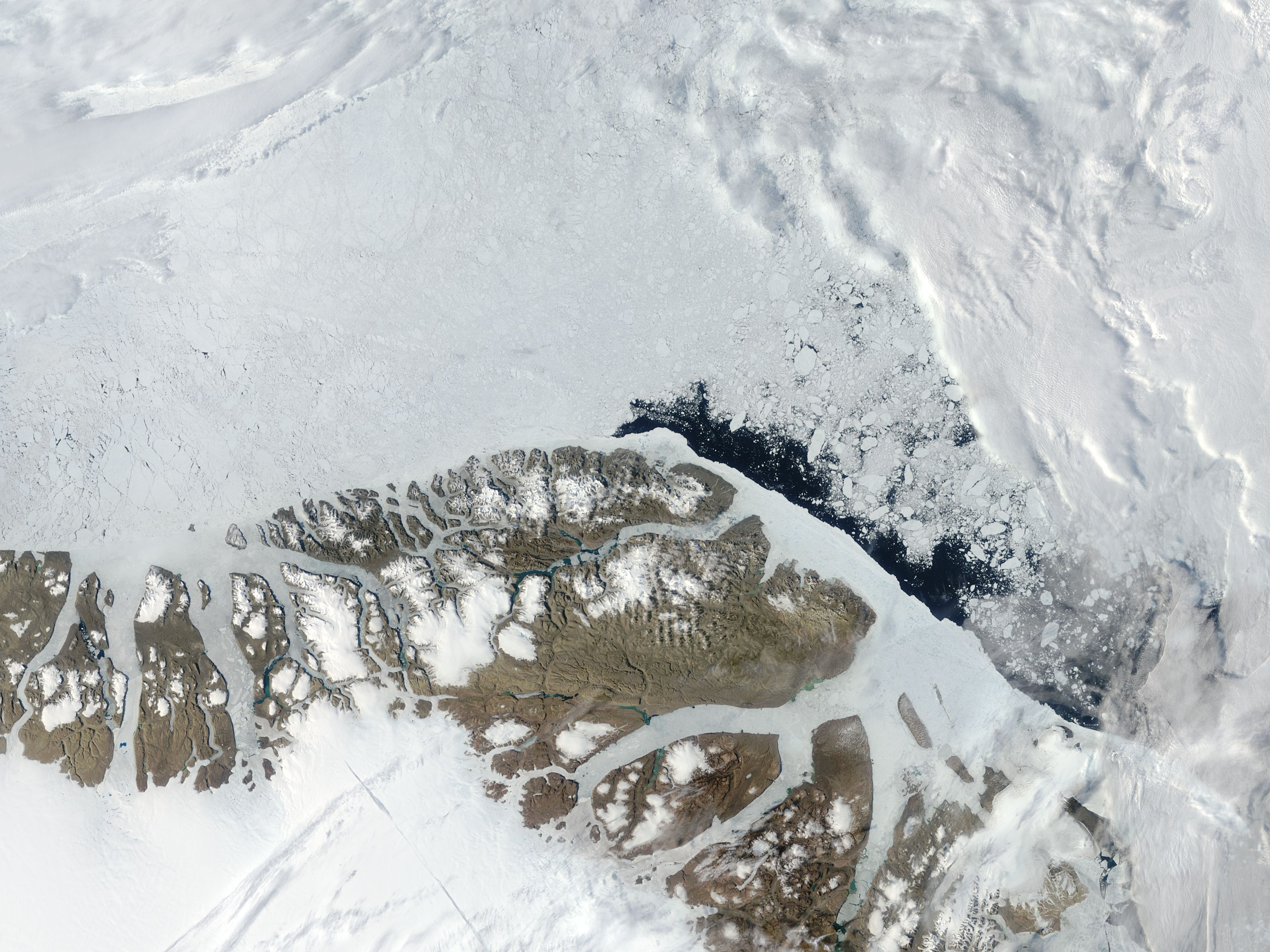
- Satellite image of the northern end of Greenland

- Location of Hazenland in Greenland
- Interactive map of Hazenland

Geography
- Location: Lincoln Sea
- Coordinates: 83°12′N 40°27′W
- Area: 226 km^{2} (87 sq mi)
- Length: 37 km (23 mi)8
- Coastline: 85.3 km (53 mi)

Administration
- Greenland
- Zone: Northeast Greenland National Park

Demographics
- Population: 0

Hazenland or Hazen Land is an uninhabited island of the Lincoln Sea in Peary Land, far northern Greenland.

The island was named in May 1882 by James Booth Lockwood of the Lady Franklin Bay Expedition after General William Babcock Hazen, who had organized the venture. Lockwood reached his farthest north (83° 24′N) on neighboring Lockwood Island.

== Geography ==
Hazenland is located off the eastern side of East Jensen Island in the De Long Fjord zone. The island has an area of 226 km^{2} (87 sq mi) and a shoreline of 85.3 km (53.0 mi).

Its eastern shore forms the western side of Weyprecht Fjord, beyond which lies Lockwood Island. Small and narrow Inge Island, located at the mouth of De Long Fjord lies 2 km (1.2 mi) off the western side of Hazenland Island. Wild Sound extends off the southwestern shore and MacMillan Island rises beyond it. Moa Island lies to the southeast at the mouth of Harder Fjord, separated from Hazenland's shore by a narrow sound.

Map of Northern Ellesmere Island and far Northern Greenland.

== See also ==
- List of islands of Greenland
