= List of features in Greenland named after Greenlandic Inuit =

A number of geographic features in Greenland were named after Greenlandic Inuit. Arctic explorer Knud Rasmussen was partly of Greenlandic origin and several places and landforms in Greenland, such as the Knud Rasmussen Range and Knud Rasmussen Land, were named after him. The following places were named after not so well-known Inuit persons:

- Brønlund's Grave
- Cape Christiansen
- Hannah Island
- Hans Island
- Hendrik Island
- Joe Island
- Jørgen Brønlund Fjord
- Navarana Fjord
- Tobias Glacier
- Tobias Island (Tuppiap Qeqertaa)
- Tobias Valley
