= Weyprecht Fjord =

Fjord in Greenland

- Map of Northern Ellesmere Island and far Northern Greenland

- Location in Greenland
- Location: Arctic
- Coordinates: 83°12′N 39°0′W
- Ocean/sea sources: Lincoln Sea
- Basin countries: Greenland
- Max. length: 50 km (31 mi)
- Max. width: 7 km (4.3 mi)
- Frozen: All year round
- Settlements: Uninhabited

Weyprecht Fjord is a fjord in Peary Land, northern Greenland. To the northwest, the fjord opens into the Lincoln Sea of the Arctic Ocean. It is part of the Northeast Greenland National Park.

The fjord is named after Austro-Hungarian Arctic explorer Karl Weyprecht.

== Geography ==
Weyprecht Fjord is located east of the De Long Fjord. It opens to the northwest east of Hazenland and to the west of Lockwood Island with the Conger Sound branching east of the island separating it from Roosevelt Land. Its mouth is located between Cape Hommock and Cape Christiansen.

In its inner part, by Moa Island, Harder Fjord opens into Weyprecht Fjord, extending eastwards. It forms the northern limit of Amundsen Land to the southeast and at its head is a valley running eastwards north of which rises the Roosevelt Range. The sea in the area is almost permanently covered by ice.

== See also ==
- List of fjords of Greenland
- Peary Land
