= Cape Christiansen =

Headland in Greenland

Cape Christiansen Kap Christiansen
- Cape
- Map of part of Ellesmere Island and far Northern Greenland

- Coordinates: 83°25′N 39°40′W
- Location: Peary Land, Greenland
- Offshore water bodies: Conger Sound; Lincoln Sea; Weyprecht Fjord

Cape Christiansen (Danish: Kap Christiansen) is a headland in North Greenland. Administratively it belongs to the Northeast Greenland National Park.

Cape Christiansen was named after Frederick Thorlip Christiansen (1846 – 1884), Inughuit dogsled driver and guide of the Lady Franklin Bay Expedition who died of starvation on April 5, 1884 at Camp Clay.

== Geography ==
Cape Christiansen is a headland located at the northern end of Lockwood Island, on the western side of the mouth of Conger Sound and on the eastern side of Weyprecht Fjord. Near the point there is a cairn that was built by Lieutenant Lockwood in 1882. The cairn was surveyed by Robert Peary in 1900 and by Lauge Koch in 1921.

Cape Kane is the headland on the eastern side of Conger Sound, at the northern end of Roosevelt Land.

== See also ==
- List of geographic features in Greenland named after Greenlandic Inuit
