= Harder Fjord =

Fjord in Peary Land, Greenland

- Harders Fjord
- Map of Northern Ellesmere Island and far Northern Greenland

- Location in Greenland
- Location: Arctic
- Coordinates: 83°08′N 38°00′W
- River sources: Dreng Glacier
- Ocean/sea sources: Weyprecht Fjord; Lincoln Sea
- Basin countries: Greenland
- Max. length: 24 km (15 mi)
- Max. width: 3 km (1.9 mi)
- Frozen: all year round
- Settlements: none

Harder Fjord (Danish: Harders Fjord) is a fjord in Peary Land, far northern Greenland.

The Harder Ford Fault Zone (HFFZ) is a geological structural feature in North Greenland named after the fjord.

== Geography ==
Harder Fjord is the innermost branch of the Weyprecht Fjord system. Its southern shore forms the northern limit of Amundsen Land. To the north lies the southern end of Hazenland, Moa Island and Roosevelt Land. The fjord is roughly oriented in an east / west direction and is over 24 km (15 mi) in length. Cape Holger Danske is the headland to the south of the mouth of the fjord, in the inner Wild Sound area.

The Dreng Glacier (Dreng Brae) has its terminus at the head of the fjord, deep inside the mainland of the Peary Land peninsula.

== See also ==
- List of fjords of Greenland
