= Sverdrup Island (Greenland) =

Island in Greenland

Native name: Sverdrup Ø
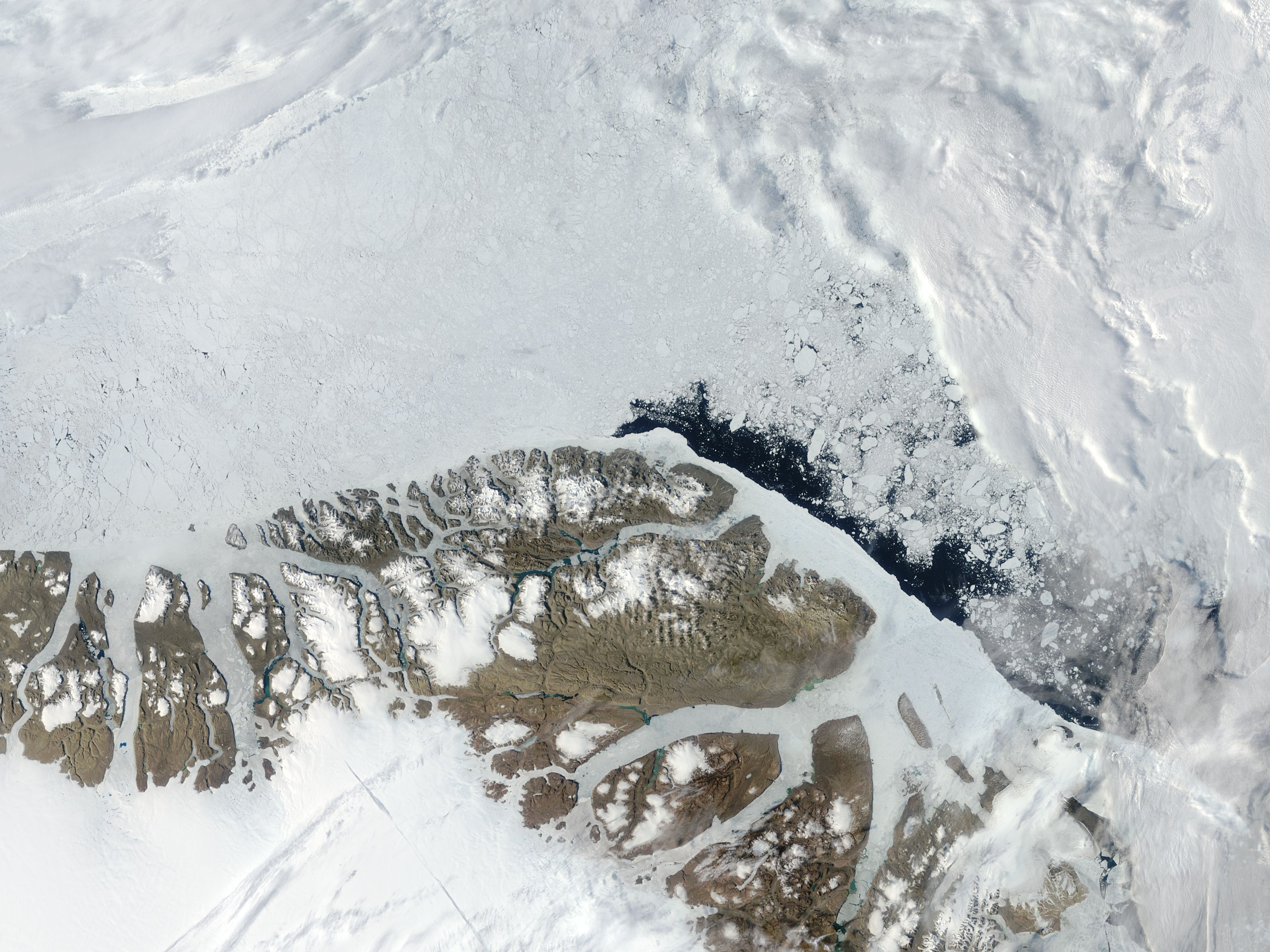
- Satellite image of the northern end of Greenland with Sverdrup Island in centre left.

- Location of Sverdrup Island in Greenland
- Interactive map of Sverdrup Island

Geography
- Location: Lincoln Sea
- Coordinates: 82°54′N 46°36′W
- Adjacent to: Arctic Ocean
- Area: 436 km^{2} (168 sq mi)
- Area rank: 20th largest in Greenland
- Length: 28 km (17.4 mi)
- Width: 20 km (12 mi)
- Coastline: 130 km (81 mi)
- Highest elevation: 1,317 m (4321 ft)

Administration
- Greenland
- Municipality: Northeast Greenland National Park

Demographics
- Population: 0 (2022)
- Pop. density: 0/km^{2} (0/sq mi)
- Ethnic groups: None

Sverdrup Island (Danish: Sverdrup Ø) is an uninhabited island in the far north of Greenland, in the Northeast Greenland National Park area. It was named after Otto Sverdrup during the Second Thule Expedition lead by Knud Rasmussen, from 1916 to 1918.

== Geography ==
Sverdrup Island is located west of Nansen Land, to the north of Freuchen Land off the mouth of J.P. Koch Fjord in the Lincoln Sea, and to the east of Elison Island and John Murray Island. The island has an area of 436 km² and a shoreline of 130 kilometres.

Chipp Sound in the west separates Sverdrup Island from smaller Elison Island and Mascart Sound in the east separates it from Nansen Land. Lemming Fjord has its mouth in the NW side of the island and extends deeply southwards, almost cutting Sverdrup Island in two. The island is mountainous, with the highest summit rising to a height of 1,317 m.

Map of part of Ellesmere Island and far Northern Greenland.

== See also ==
- List of islands of Greenland
- Peary Land
