= 140th meridian east =

Line of longitude

140th meridian east (interactive map)

The meridian 140° east of Greenwich is a line of longitude that extends from the North Pole across the Arctic Ocean, Asia, the Pacific Ocean, Australasia, the Indian Ocean, the Southern Ocean, and Antarctica to the South Pole.

The 140th meridian east forms a great ellipse with the 40th meridian west.

== From Pole to Pole ==
Starting at the North Pole and heading south to the South Pole, the 140th meridian east passes through:

Co-ordinates	Country, territory or sea	Notes
90°0′N 140°0′E	Arctic Ocean	
75°57′N 140°0′E	Russia	Sakha Republic — Kotelny Island, New Siberian Islands
74°54′N 140°0′E	Laptev Sea	
73°26′N 140°0′E	Russia	Sakha Republic — Great Lyakhovsky Island, New Siberian Islands
73°20′N 140°0′E	Laptev Sea	
72°29′N 140°0′E	Russia	Sakha Republic; Khabarovsk Krai — from 61°58′N 140°0′E
57°42′N 140°0′E	Sea of Okhotsk	
54°6′N 140°0′E	Russia	Khabarovsk Krai
48°20′N 140°0′E	Sea of Japan	
42°41′N 140°0′E	Japan	Island of Hokkaidō — Hokkaidō Prefecture
42°7′N 140°0′E	Sea of Japan	
41°38′N 140°0′E	Japan	Island of Hokkaidō — Hokkaidō Prefecture
41°32′N 140°0′E	Sea of Japan	
40°44′N 140°0′E	Japan	Island of Honshū — Aomori Prefecture — Akita Prefecture — from 40°25′N 140°0′E
39°51′N 140°0′E	Sea of Japan	
39°20′N 140°0′E	Japan	Island of Honshū — Akita Prefecture — Yamagata Prefecture — from 39°6′N 140°0′E — Fukushima Prefecture — from 37°45′N 140°0′E — Tochigi Prefecture — from 37°8′N 140°0′E — Ibaraki Prefecture — from 36°22′N 140°0′E — Chiba Prefecture — from 35°54′N 140°0′E
35°39′N 140°0′E	Tokyo Bay	
35°28′N 140°0′E	Japan	Island of Honshū — Chiba Prefecture (Bōsō Peninsula)
35°1′N 140°0′E	Pacific Ocean	Passing just east of the island of Hachijōjima, Tokyo Prefecture, Japan (at 33°5′N 139°52′E); Passing just east of the island of Aogashima, Tokyo Prefecture, Japan (at 32°27′N 139°47′E); Passing through the Bayonnaise Rocks, Tokyo Prefecture, Japan (at 31°55′N 139°0′E); Passing just west of Smith Island, Tokyo Prefecture, Japan (at 31°26′N 140°2′E); Passing just west of Tori Shima, Tokyo Prefecture, Japan (at 30°29′N 140°18′E); Passing just east of Ulithi Atoll, Federated States of Micronesia (at 9°55′N 139°34′E)
2°21′S 140°0′E	Indonesia	Island of New Guinea
8°14′S 140°0′E	Arafura Sea	
11°22′S 140°0′E	Gulf of Carpentaria	
17°43′S 140°0′E	Australia	Queensland; South Australia — from 26°0′S 140°0′E
37°29′S 140°0′E	Indian Ocean	Australian authorities consider this to be part of the Southern Ocean
60°0′S 140°0′E	Southern Ocean	
66°42′S 140°0′E	Antarctica	Adélie Land, claimed by France

== Japan ==
=== Gallery ===
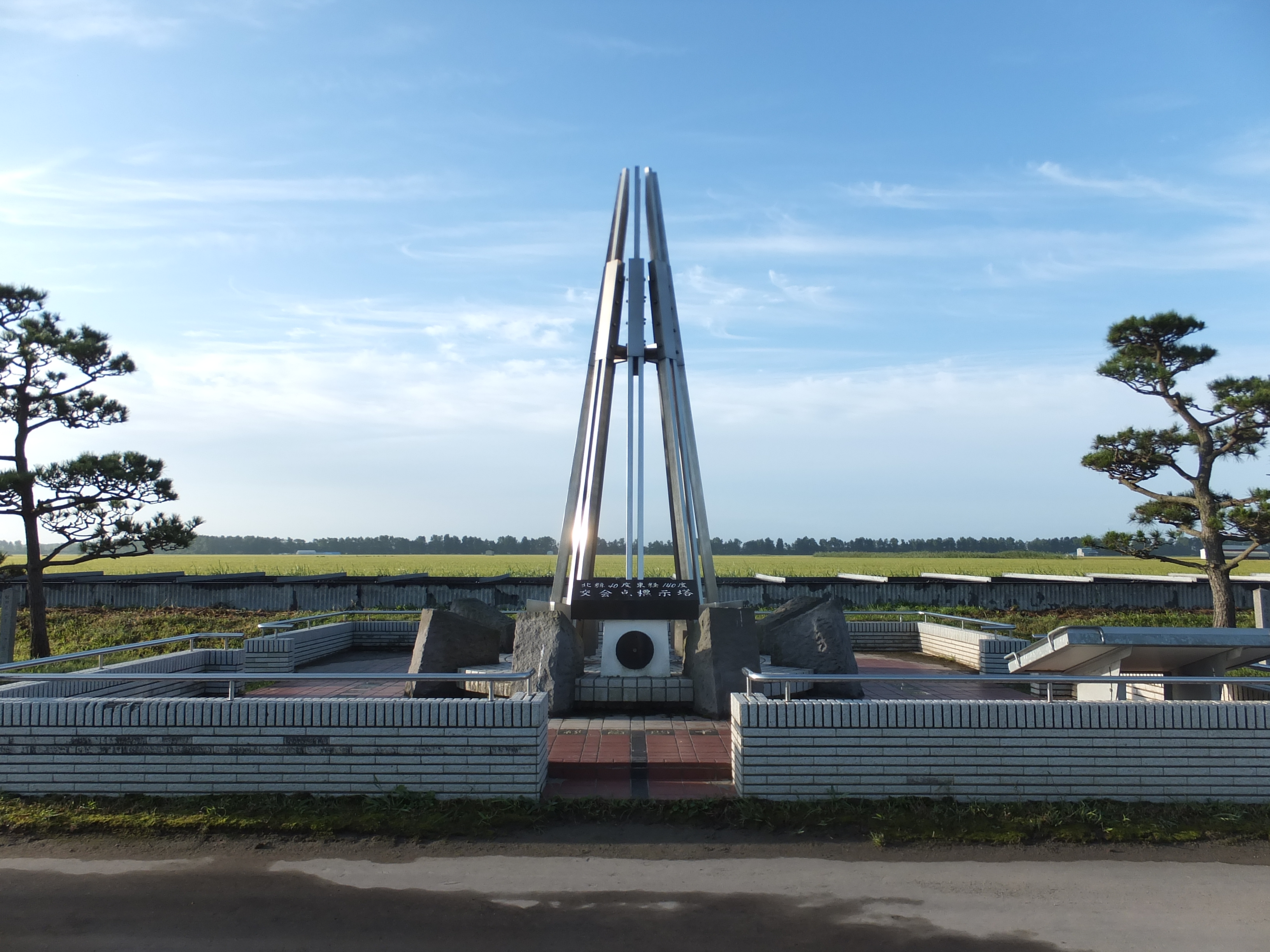
40°N and 140°E Crossing Point in Ogata, Akita

== See also ==
- 139th meridian east
- 141st meridian east
