= Nares Land =

Island in Greenland

- Location of Nares Land in Greenland
- Interactive map of Nares Land
- Etymology: Named after Polar explorer Sir George Nares

Geography
- Location: Lincoln Sea
- Coordinates: 82.4167°N 46°W
- Area: 1,466 km^{2} (566 sq mi)
- Area rank: 8th largest in Greenland; 259th largest in world
- Coastline: 192.4 km (119.55 mi)
- Highest elevation: 1,067 m (3501 ft)

Administration
- Greenland
- Unincorporated area: NE Greenland National Park

Demographics
- Population: 0 (2021)
- Pop. density: 0/km^{2} (0/sq mi)
- Ethnic groups: none

Nares Land or Naresland is an island in far northern Greenland. The island was named after Polar explorer Sir George Nares during the Lady Franklin Bay Expedition, lead by Adolphus Greely, from 1881 to 1884.

== Geography ==
The island lies between the Victoria Fjord and the Nordenskjöld Fjord separated from the Freuchen Land Peninsula of the mainland by a narrow sound. Stephenson Island and John Murray Island lie off its northern end. Nares Land is fairly large, with an area of 1,466 square kilometres (566 square miles) and a shoreline of 192.4 kilometres (119.6 miles). It is 75 kilometres (47 miles) long and up to 30 kilometres (19 miles) wide in its widest place. It has an average elevation of 161 metres (528 feet) and its highest point is 1,067 metres (3,501 feet).

The area where the island lies has a severe Polar climate and was formerly part of Avannaa, originally Nordgrønland ("North Greenland"), a former county of Greenland until 31 December 2008. The sea around the island is frozen practically the whole year round.

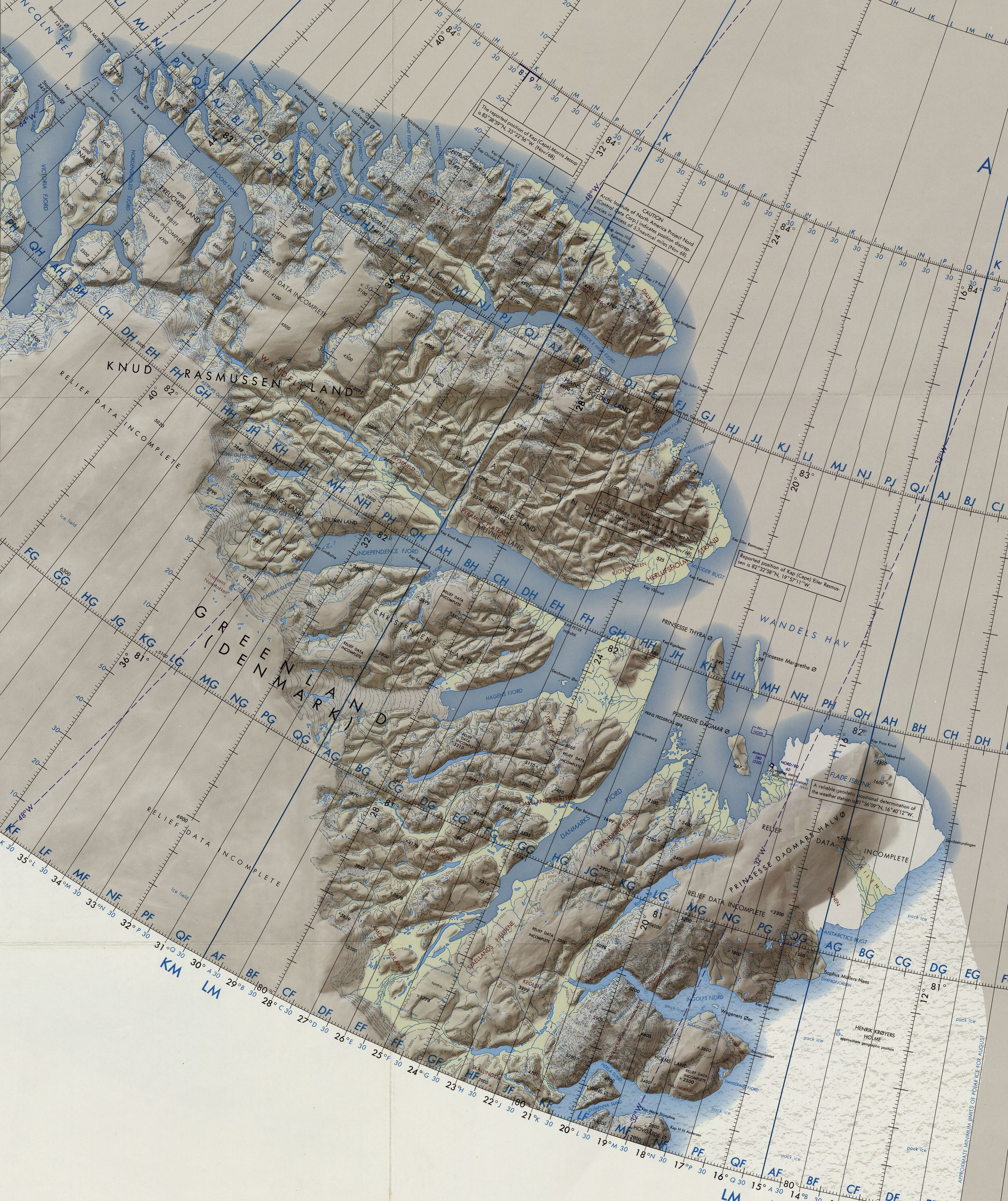
Map of Northeastern Greenland.

== See also ==
- List of islands of Greenland
- Peary Land
