= Thorild Wulff =

Swedish botanist (1877–1917)

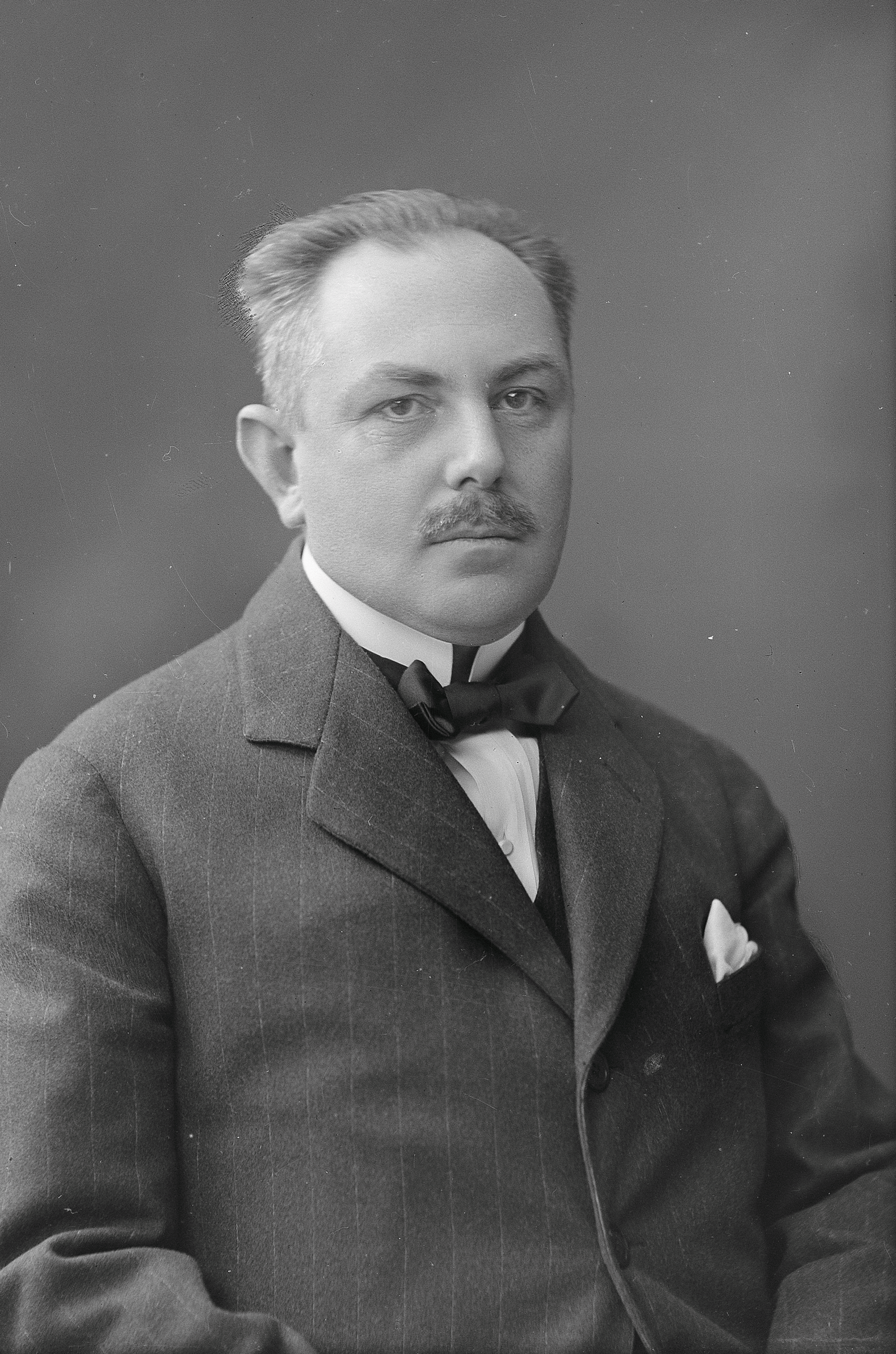
Thorild Wulff in 1915

Thorild Wulff (born 1 April 1877 in Gothenburg; died late August or early September 1917 in Northwest Greenland) was a Swedish botanist and polar explorer.

== Career ==
He obtained his doctorate degree from Lund University in 1902 based on observation he had made during a Swedish-Russian geodesy expedition to Svalbard.

Wulff was research assistant in horticulture ("Centralanstalten för försöksväsendet på jordbruksområdet") 1905–09, docent of botany at Stockholm University College 1909–13. In 1911 he travelled to Iceland with his friend the author Albert Engström who gave an account of the journey ("Åt Häcklefjäll" 1913).

He participated in the Second Thule Expedition led by Knud Rasmussen from Thule to Cape Bridgman in the northeastern corner of Peary Land. On the return trip, the expedition suffered from bad weather and insufficient supplies, resulting in casualties, one of them being Wulff. He died from fatigue in the northeastern part of Inglefield Land near Cape Agassiz off the Humboldt Glacier.

== Honours ==
The Greenlandic plant species Braya thorild-wulffii (Brassicaceae) was named after him in 1923. The Wulff Land peninsula in Northern Greenland is similarly named for him.
