= 39th meridian west =

Line of longitude

39th meridian west

The meridian 39° west of Greenwich is a line of longitude that extends from the North Pole across the Arctic Ocean, Greenland, the Atlantic Ocean, South America, the Southern Ocean, and Antarctica to the South Pole.

The 39th meridian west forms a great circle with the 141st meridian east.

== From Pole to Pole ==
Starting at the North Pole and heading south to the South Pole, the 39th meridian west passes through:

Co-ordinates	Country, territory or sea	Notes
90°0′N 39°0′W	Arctic Ocean	
83°39′N 39°0′W	Lincoln Sea	
83°19′N 39°0′W	Greenland	
65°33′N 39°0′W	Atlantic Ocean	
3°24′S 39°0′W	Brazil	Ceará; Pernambuco — from 7°51′S 39°0′W; Bahia — from 8°45′S 39°0′W
14°22′S 39°0′W	Atlantic Ocean	Passing close to the coast of Brazil, just east of Ilhéus
15°15′S 39°0′W	Brazil	Bahia
16°14′S 39°0′W	Atlantic Ocean	
60°0′S 39°0′W	Southern Ocean	
77°43′S 39°0′W	Antarctica	Claimed by both Argentina (Argentine Antarctica) and United Kingdom (British Antarctic Territory)

== See also ==
- 38th meridian west
- 40th meridian west
