= Victoria Fjord =

Fjord in Greenland

- Location in Greenland
- Location: Arctic
- Coordinates: 82°10′N 46°00′W
- Ocean/sea sources: Lincoln Sea
- Basin countries: Greenland
- Max. length: 130 km (81 mi)
- Max. width: 27 km (17 mi)
- Settlements: Uninhabited

Victoria Fjord, also known as Victoria Inlet, is a large fjord in northern Greenland.

Its eastern shore forms the western limit of Peary Land.

== Geography ==
To the northwest the fjord opens into the Lincoln Sea of the Arctic Ocean. Wulff Land forms the western shore of the fjord. The C. H. Ostenfeld Glacier has its terminus at the head of the fjord.

=== Islands ===
Nares Land lies east of the fjord and a narrow sound between this island and the mainland connects inner Victoria Fjord with Nordenskiöld Fjord to the east. Stephenson Island is located at its northern end by its mouth.

Map of Northern Ellesmere Island and far Northern Greenland.

== See also ==
- List of fjords of Greenland
- Peary Land
