= Lockwood Island =

Island in Greenland

Lockwood Ø
- Map of part of Ellesmere Island and far Northern Greenland.

- Location within Greenland

Geography
- Location: Weyprecht Fjord; Lincoln Sea
- Coordinates: 83°21′N 39°20′W
- Length: 12 km (7.5 mi)
- Width: 5 km (3.1 mi)
- Highest elevation: 760 m (2490 ft)
- Highest point: Mount Schley

Administration
- Greenland
- Zone: Northeast Greenland National Park

Demographics
- Population: 0

Lockwood Island (Danish: Lockwood Ø) is an island of the Lincoln Sea, Greenland. Administratively it belongs to the Northeast Greenland National Park.

Lockwood Island is the northernmost sizeable coastal island of Greenland. The waters around the island are frozen the year round.

== History ==
This island was named after U.S. Arctic explorer James Booth Lockwood (1852-1884). Lockwood and Sgt. David Legge Brainard achieved a new "farthest north" record of 83°23'8" on the island at the time of Greely's Lady Franklin Bay Expedition.

== Geography ==
Lockwood Island is located at the mouth of Weyprecht Fjord, its western shore forming the eastern side of the area at the entrance of the fjord. On the eastern shore of the island 3 km (1.9 mi) broad Conger Sound separates it from Cape Kane in Roosevelt Land in the mainland whose northernmost point is Cape Washington to the east beyond Hunt Fjord. The island rises to a height of 760 m (2,490 ft) at Mount Schley.

Cape Christiansen is the headland at the northern end and small Brainard Island lies 2.7 km (1.7 mi) west of the island's western shore. The waters around Lockwood Island are icebound most of the year.

== See also ==
- List of islands of Greenland
- Lady Franklin Bay Expedition
- Peary Land
