= John Murray Island =

Island in Greenland

Native name: John Murray Ø
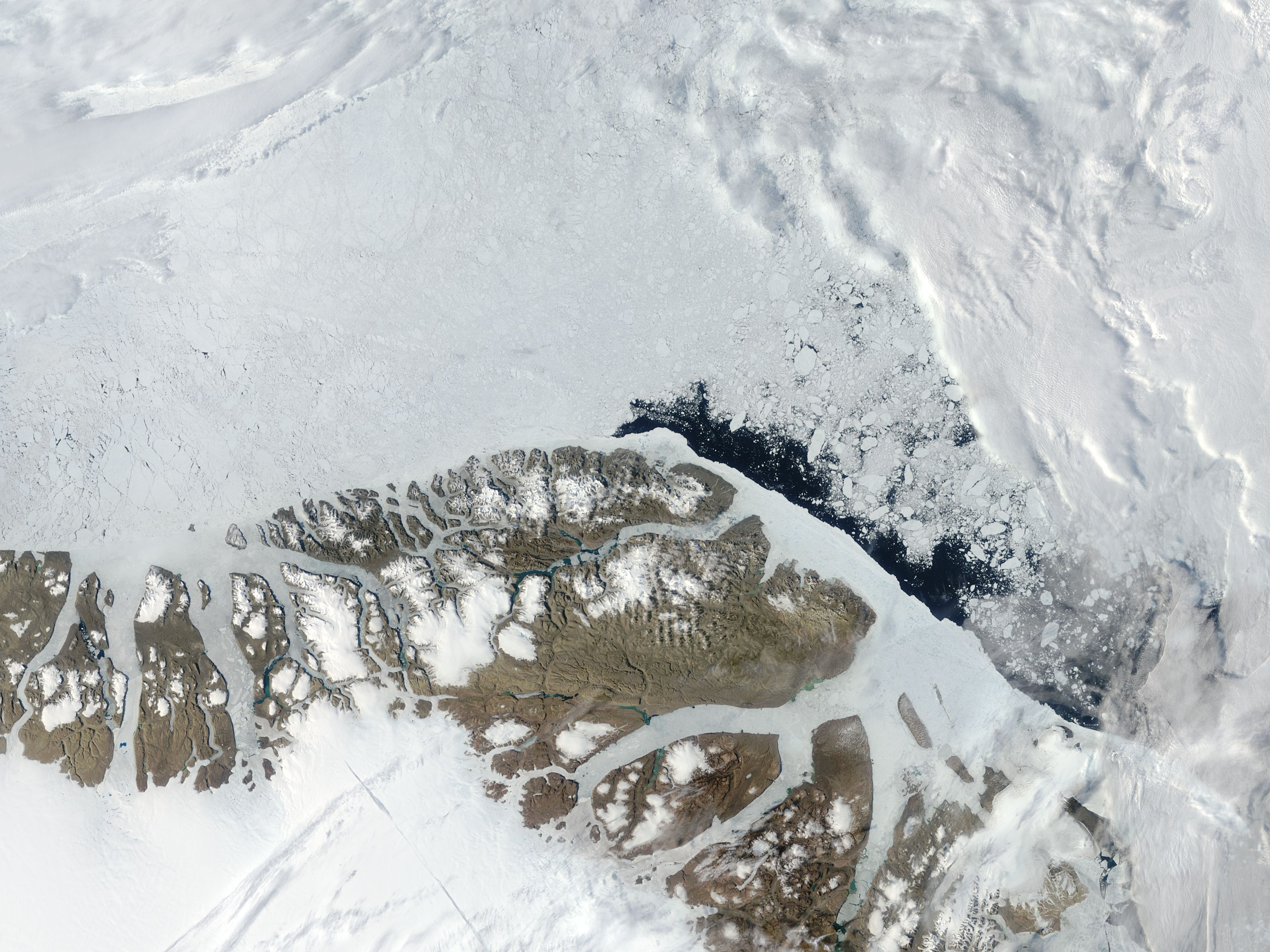
- Satellite image of the northern end of Greenland with John Murray Island centre left.

- Location of John Murray Island in Greenland
- Interactive map of John Murray Island

Geography
- Location: Lincoln Sea
- Coordinates: 82°46′N 48°42′W
- Adjacent to: Arctic Ocean
- Area: 143 km^{2} (55 sq mi)
- Area rank: Top 50 largest in Greenland
- Coastline: 47 km (29.2 mi)
- Highest elevation: 799 m (2621 ft)

Administration
- Greenland
- Municipality: Northeast Greenland National Park

Demographics
- Population: 0 (2022)
- Pop. density: 0/km^{2} (0/sq mi)
- Ethnic groups: Inuit

John Murray Island, Danish John Murray Ø, is an uninhabited island in the far north of Greenland, in the Northeast Greenland National Park area.

== Geography ==
John Murray Island is located off the mouth of J.P. Koch Fjord in the Lincoln Sea, to the west of Sverdrup Island and to the north of Nares Land. The island has an area of 120.9 km ² and a shoreline of 43.1 kilometres. Beaumont Island lies 20 km to the west of the western end of the island.

== Illustrations ==
Map of part of Ellesmere Island and far Northern Greenland.

== See also ==
- List of islands of Greenland
