= 40th meridian west =

Line of longitude

40th meridian west (interactive map)

The meridian 40° west of Greenwich is a line of longitude that extends from the North Pole across the Arctic Ocean, Greenland, the Atlantic Ocean, South America, the Southern Ocean, and Antarctica to the South Pole.

The 40th meridian west forms a great circle with the 140th meridian east.

Part of the 40th meridian west, from 22.3°N to 45°N, serves as the boundary between the New York and Santa Maria Oceanic flight information regions.

== From Pole to Pole ==
Starting at the North Pole and heading south to the South Pole, the 40th meridian west passes through:

Co-ordinates	Country, territory or sea	Notes
90°0′N 40°0′W	Arctic Ocean	
83°39′N 40°0′W	Lincoln Sea	
83°18′N 40°0′W	Greenland	
65°1′N 40°0′W	Atlantic Ocean	
2°50′S 40°0′W	Brazil	Ceará; Pernambuco — from 7°22′S 40°0′W; Bahia — from 9°3′S 40°0′W; Minas Gerais — from 15°59′S 40°0′W; Bahia — from 16°21′S 40°0′W; Espírito Santo — from 18°7′S 40°0′W
19°46′S 40°0′W	Atlantic Ocean	
60°0′S 40°0′W	Southern Ocean	
77°35′S 40°0′W	Antarctica	Claimed by both Argentina (Argentine Antarctica) and United Kingdom (British Antarctic Territory)

== See also ==
- 39th meridian west
- 41st meridian west
