= Freuchen Land =

Peninsula of Greenland

- 1987 map of part of Ellesmere Island and far Northern Greenland. In it, Freuchen Land is shown with unknown inland relief.

- Location within Greenland

Geography
- Location: NW Greenland
- Coordinates: 82°30′N 43°0′W
- Adjacent to: J.P. Koch Fjord; Nordenskiöld Fjord
- Length: 90 km (56 mi)
- Width: 60 km (37 mi)
- Highest elevation: 1,432 m (4698 ft)

Administration
- Greenland (Denmark)

Demographics
- Population: Uninhabited

Freuchen Land is a peninsula in far northwestern Greenland. It is a part of the Northeast Greenland National Park.

== History ==
Freuchen Land was named after Arctic explorer Peter Freuchen (1886–1957), who took part in the 1906–1908 Denmark expedition and later in Knud Rasmussen's Thule Expeditions.

== Geography ==
Freuchen Land is located to the northeast of Nares Land, south of Sverdrup Island, and west of Nansen Land and the Hans Tausen Ice Cap. Its westernmost headland is Cape Wegener.

The peninsula is bounded to the west by the Nordenskiöld Fjord and to the east by the J.P. Koch Fjord. Navarana Fjord, a branch of J.P. Koch Fjord, cuts deeply southwards into the peninsula, nearly dividing it in two. This fjord was named after Peter Freuchen's Inuk wife, Navarana Mequpaluk (died 1921).

To the southeast lie the Henson Gletscher and the Expedition Glacier which have their terminus at the J.P. Koch Fjord. To the south the peninsula is attached to the mainland and its ice cap.

Freuchen Land is mountainous and mostly glaciated in its high interior. Elevations reaching 1,432 metres (4,698 ft) are found in the central part of the peninsula.

== See also ==
- Cartographic expeditions to Greenland
