= Navarana Fjord =

Fjord in Peary Land, Greenland

- Map of Northern Ellesmere Island and far Northern Greenland.

- Location in Greenland
- Location: Arctic
- Coordinates: 82°35′N 42°0′W
- Ocean/sea sources: J.P. Koch Fjord; Lincoln Sea
- Basin countries: Greenland
- Max. length: 40 km (25 mi)
- Max. width: 3 km (1.9 mi)
- Settlements: 0

Navarana Fjord is a fjord in Peary Land, far northern Greenland. It is named after an Inuk woman.

In 1984 important zinc and barium deposits were discovered in the Navarana Fjord. Australian Ironbark Zinc corporation was granted an exploration licence in 2007.

== History ==
This fjord was mapped by Danish Arctic explorer Eigil Knuth during the Danish Peary Land Expedition of 1947–1950. It was named after Navarana Mequpaluk (died 1921), the wife of Arctic explorer Peter Freuchen (1886–1957). Navarana had died at Upernavik in 1921 just before joining the Fifth Thule Expedition with her husband. Her death came at the time of the influenza epidemic that ravaged indigenous populations in Greenland in the early 1920s.

== Geography ==
Navarana Fjord is located in the northeastern part of Freuchen Land, western Peary Land. It is the only significant branch of J.P. Koch Fjord, with the junction about 45 km (28 mi) east of the mouth in the southern shore. The fjord runs roughly southwards in the middle fjord zone, deeply dividing the Freuchen Land Peninsula. It is about 40 km (25 mi) in length and high mountains rise on both sides of the shore, with impressive up to 1,300 m (4,300 ft) high cliffs in some places.

There is a fairly large glacier, the Navarana Fjord Glacier, at the head of the fjord discharging from the southeast.

== Geology ==
Geologically this fjord is located in the Paleozoic Franklinian Basin. Navarana Fjord is part of an escarpment at the northern edge of a Silurian limestone shelf with a fault running for 500 km (310 mi) reaching Nyeboe Land.

Sisamatispongia is a genus of fossil sponges whose spicules are only recorded from Navarana Fjord.

== Bibliography ==
- H.P. Trettin (ed.), Geology of the Innuitian Orogen and Arctic Platform of Canada and Greenland. 1991

== See also ==
- List of fjords of Greenland
- List of geographic features in Greenland named after Greenlandic Inuit
