= Amundsen Land =

Peninsula in Peary Land, Greenland

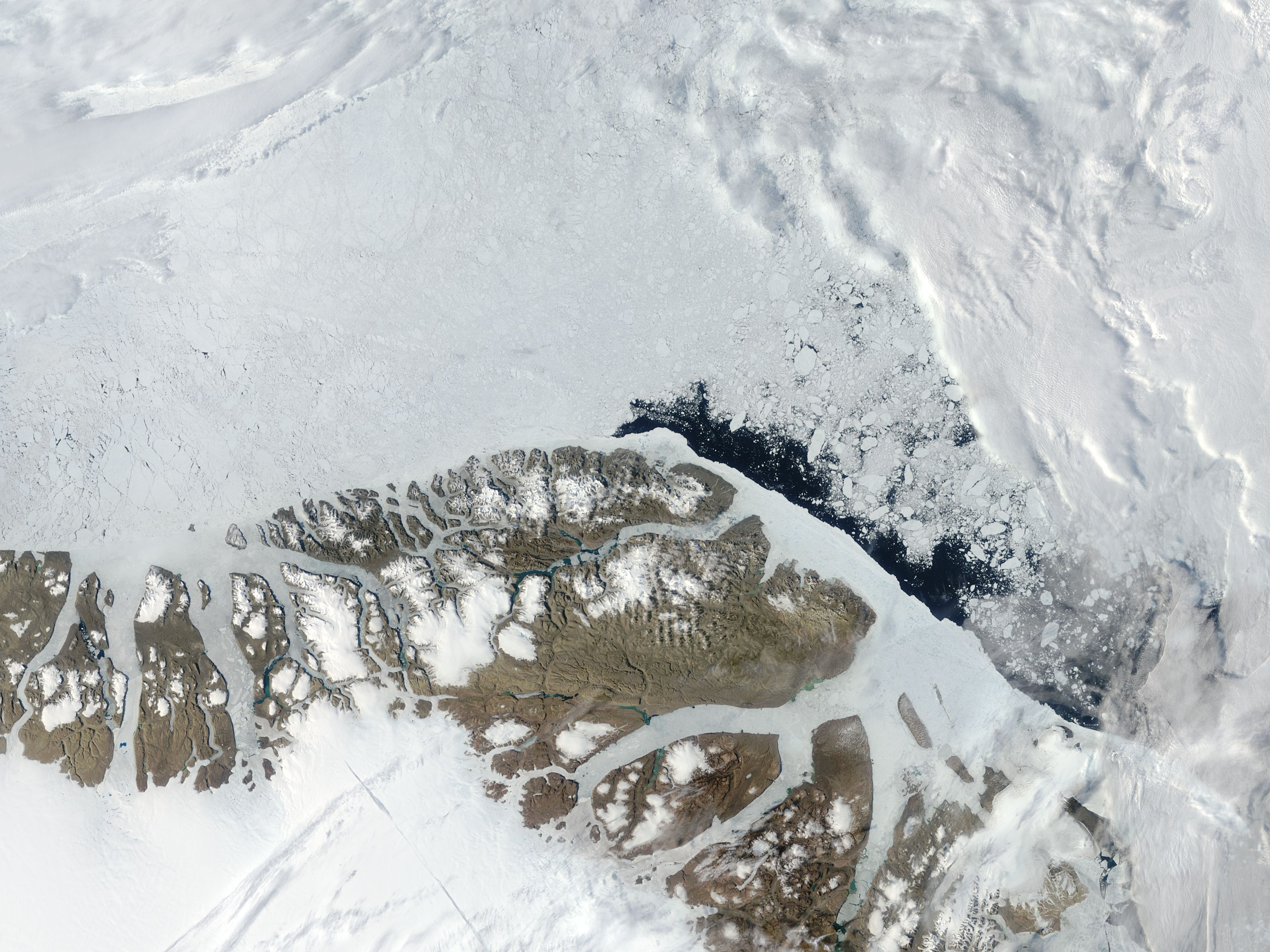
- Satellite image of the northern end of Greenland.

- Location within Greenland

Geography
- Location: Peary Land, Greenland
- Coordinates: 83°0′N 36°20′W
- Adjacent to: Harder Fjord; O.B. Bøggild Fjord
- Length: 50 km (31 mi)
- Width: 30 km (19 mi)
- Highest elevation: 1,466 m (4810 ft)
- Highest point: Unnamed

Administration
- Greenland (Denmark)

Demographics
- Population: Uninhabited

Amundsen Land (Danish: Amundsens Land) or Amundsenland, is a peninsula in central North Greenland. It is a part of the Northeast Greenland National Park.

The territory was named after Norwegian explorer Roald Amundsen (1872 – 1928).

== Geography ==
Amundsen Land is located in western Peary Land, to the south of Roosevelt Land, separated from it by the Harder Fjord and the Dreng Glacier (Dreng Brae) at its head. To the west it is limited by the Weyprecht Fjord, and to the south by the O.B. Bøggild Fjord and the Nordpasset, beyond which lies the Hans Tausen Ice Cap. The westernmost headland is Cape Holger Danske.

Amundsen Land is mountainous with many glaciated areas. The highest point is a 1,466 metres (4,810 ft) summit in the central part of the peninsula.

== Bibliography ==
- H.P. Trettin (ed.), Geology of the Innuitian Orogen and Arctic Platform of Canada and Greenland. 1991

== See also ==
- Innuitian orogeny
