= J.P. Koch Fjord =

Fjord in Greenland

- Location in Greenland
- Location: Arctic
- Coordinates: 82°49′N 43°30′W
- Ocean/sea sources: Lincoln Sea
- Basin countries: Greenland
- Max. length: 80 km (50 mi)
- Max. width: 7 km (4.3 mi)
- Settlements: Uninhabited

J.P. Koch Fjord is a fjord in Peary Land, northern Greenland. To the west, the fjord opens into the Lincoln Sea of the Arctic Ocean.

It is named after Danish captain and explorer of the Arctic Johan Peter Koch (1870 – 1928),

== Geography ==
The fjord opens to the northwest to the east of Freuchen Land and the south and west of Nansen Land. The Hans Tausen Ice Cap lies to the east of the inner fjord. The Navarana Fjord branches south in the middle fjord zone. The Henson Glacier discharges from the south at its head and the Expedition Glacier from the east further north from the terminus of the Henson Glacier.

Sverdrup Island and Elison Island are located to the north of its mouth. John Murray Island lies further off to the NW. Merqujoq Island is located in the inner reaches, in a bend in the fjord.

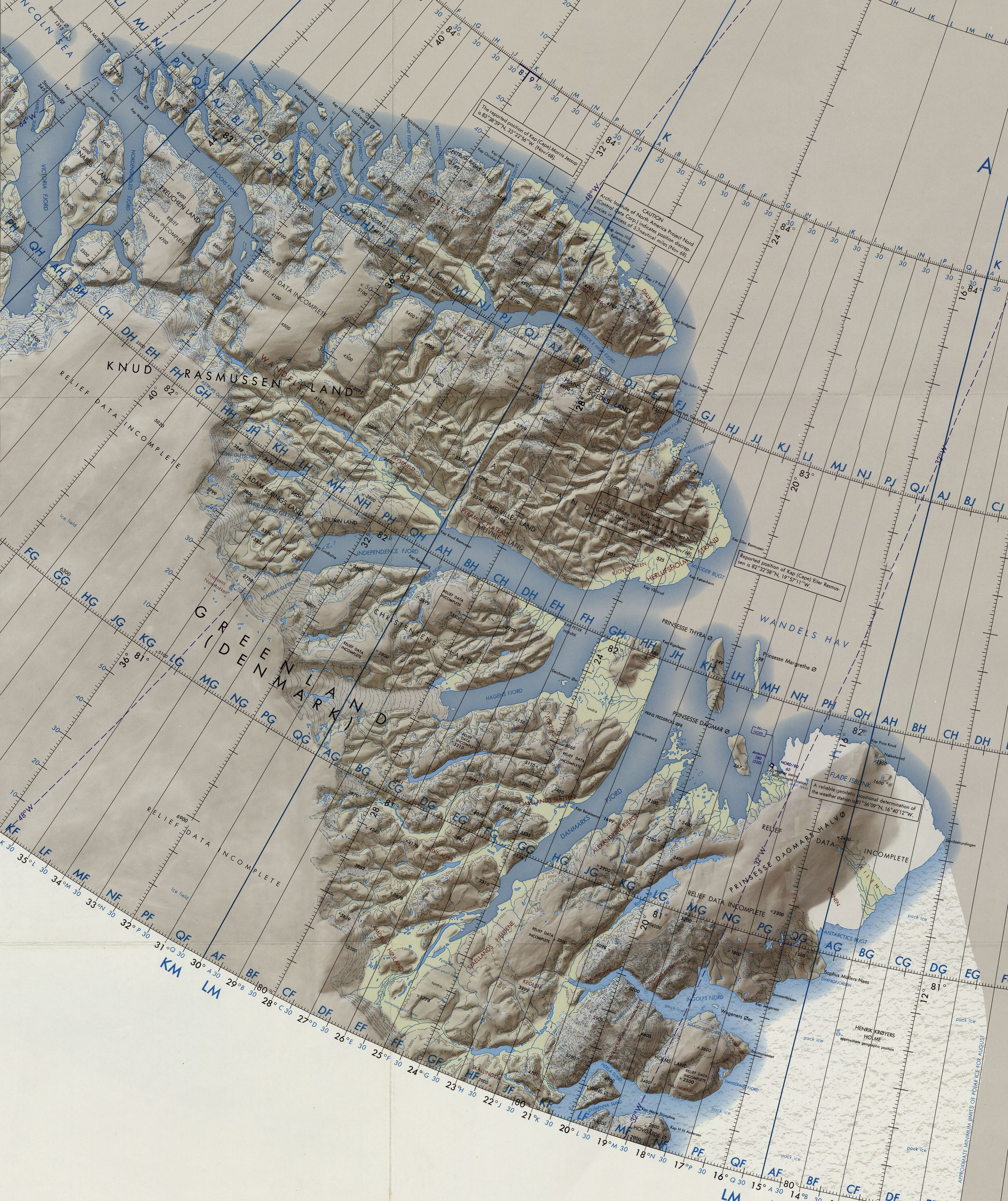
Map of Northeastern Greenland

== See also ==
- List of fjords of Greenland
- Sirius Passet
