= Hans Tausen Ice Cap =

Ice cap in Greenland

- Hans Tausens Iskappe
- Map of Far Northern Greenland.

- Location within Greenland
- Type: Ice cap
- Location: Greenland
- Coordinates: 82°30′N 37°30′W
- Area: ca 4,000 km^{2} (1,500 sq mi)
- Length: 100 km (62 mi)
- Width: 80 km (50 mi)
- Thickness: max 600 m (2,000 ft)
- Status: The future development of the ice cap is highly dependent upon summer temperatures.

Hans Tausen Ice Cap (Danish: Hans Tausens Iskappe) is an ice cap in Peary Land, northern Greenland. Administratively it is part of the Northeast Greenland National Park.

== Age ==
Ice cores show it is around 3500–4000 years old. It formed since the Holocene climatic optimum of 6000-8000 BP. It is a well studied ice cap, and is important to understanding the Holocene climatic optimum.

== Geography ==
The ice cap is located south of Amundsen Land and the Nordpasset, at the western end of the De Long Fjord area, east of Freuchen Land across the inner J.P. Koch Fjord, west of Odin Fjord and south of the O.B. Bøggild Fjord. It is about 100 km (62 mi) from north to south and 80 km (50 mi) from east to west and sits on a 1,300 m (4,300 ft) high plateau.

The Hans Tausen Ice Cap is the source of many glaciers, including the Ymer Glacier to the east, the Aajaku Glacier, Inukitsaq Glacier and Persuaq Glacier to the west, and the Lur Glacier and Tjalfe Glacier to the north.

== See also ==
- List of glaciers in Greenland
