= 136th meridian =

136th meridian may refer to:

- 136th meridian east, a line of longitude east of the Greenwich Meridian
- 136th meridian west, a line of longitude west of the Greenwich Meridian

136th meridian west	136th meridian east
