= 43rd meridian =

43rd meridian may refer to:

- 43rd meridian east, a line of longitude east of the Greenwich Meridian
- 43rd meridian west, a line of longitude west of the Greenwich Meridian
