= 44th meridian =

44th meridian may refer to:

- 44th meridian east, a line of longitude east of the Greenwich Meridian
- 44th meridian west, a line of longitude west of the Greenwich Meridian
