= 137th =

137th may refer to:

- 137th (Calgary) Battalion, CEF, unit in the Canadian Expeditionary Force during the First World War
- 137th Air Reconnaissance Regiment, air reconnaissance and guidance regiment, part of the SFR Yugoslav Air Force
- 137th Special Operations Wing (137 SOW), Oklahoma Air National Guard wing operationally-gained by the Special Operations Command (AFSOC)
- 137th Airlift Squadron flies the C-5 Galaxy and the C-17A Globemaster III
- 137th Armoured Brigade (United Kingdom), British Army unit during the Second World War
- 137th Delaware General Assembly, meeting of the legislative branch of the Delaware state government
- 137th Field Artillery Battalion (United States), Field Artillery battalion of the Army National Guard
- 137th Georgia General Assembly succeeded the 136th and served as the precedent for the 138th General Assembly in 1985
- 137th Illinois Volunteer Infantry Regiment, infantry regiment that served in the Union Army during the American Civil War
- 137th Marine Battalion (Ukraine)
- 137th meridian east, line of longitude across the Arctic Ocean, Asia, the Pacific Ocean, Australasia, the Indian Ocean, the Southern Ocean and Antarctica
- 137th meridian west, line of longitude across the Arctic Ocean, North America, the Pacific Ocean, the Southern Ocean and Antarctica
- 137th Ohio Infantry (or 137th OVI), infantry regiment in the Union Army during the American Civil War
- 137th Operations Group, Flying element of the 137th Air Refueling Wing of the Oklahoma Air National Guard
- 137th Space Warning Squadron (137 SWS), Air National Guard ground-mobile space communications unit of the United States Air Force in Greeley, Colorado
- 137th Street (Manhattan), New York
- 137th Street (Metra) or Riverdale (Metra), one of two commuter rail stations on the Metra Electric main branch in Riverdale, Illinois
- 137th Street – City College (IRT Broadway – Seventh Avenue Line), local station on the New York City Subway
- 137th Street Yard serves the IRT Flushing Line (7 <7> trains)
- Pennsylvania's 137th Representative District or Pennsylvania House of Representatives, District 137

== See also ==
- 137 (number)
- AD 137, the year 137 (CXXXVII) of the Julian calendar
- 137 BC
