= 137th meridian =

137th meridian may refer to:

- 137th meridian east, a line of longitude east of the Greenwich Meridian
- 137th meridian west, a line of longitude west of the Greenwich Meridian

137th meridian west	137th meridian east
