= 137 =

137 may refer to:

- 137 (number), the natural number following 136 and preceding 138
- 137 BC
- AD 137
- 137 (album), an album by The Pineapple Thief
- Route 137 (MBTA), a bus route in Massachusetts, US
- 137 (New Jersey bus)
- 137 Meliboea, a main-belt asteroid

== See also ==
- 137th (disambiguation)
- 2011 Mumbai bombings or 13/7, 13 July 2011 terrorist attacks at various locations in Mumbai by the Indian Mujahideen
