= 45th meridian =

45th meridian may refer to:

- 45th meridian east, a line of longitude east of the Greenwich Meridian
- 45th meridian west, a line of longitude west of the Greenwich Meridian
