= 138th meridian =

138th meridian may refer to:

- 138th meridian east, a line of longitude east of the Greenwich Meridian
- 138th meridian west, a line of longitude west of the Greenwich Meridian

138th meridian west	138th meridian east
