= 2001–02 Australian region cyclone season =

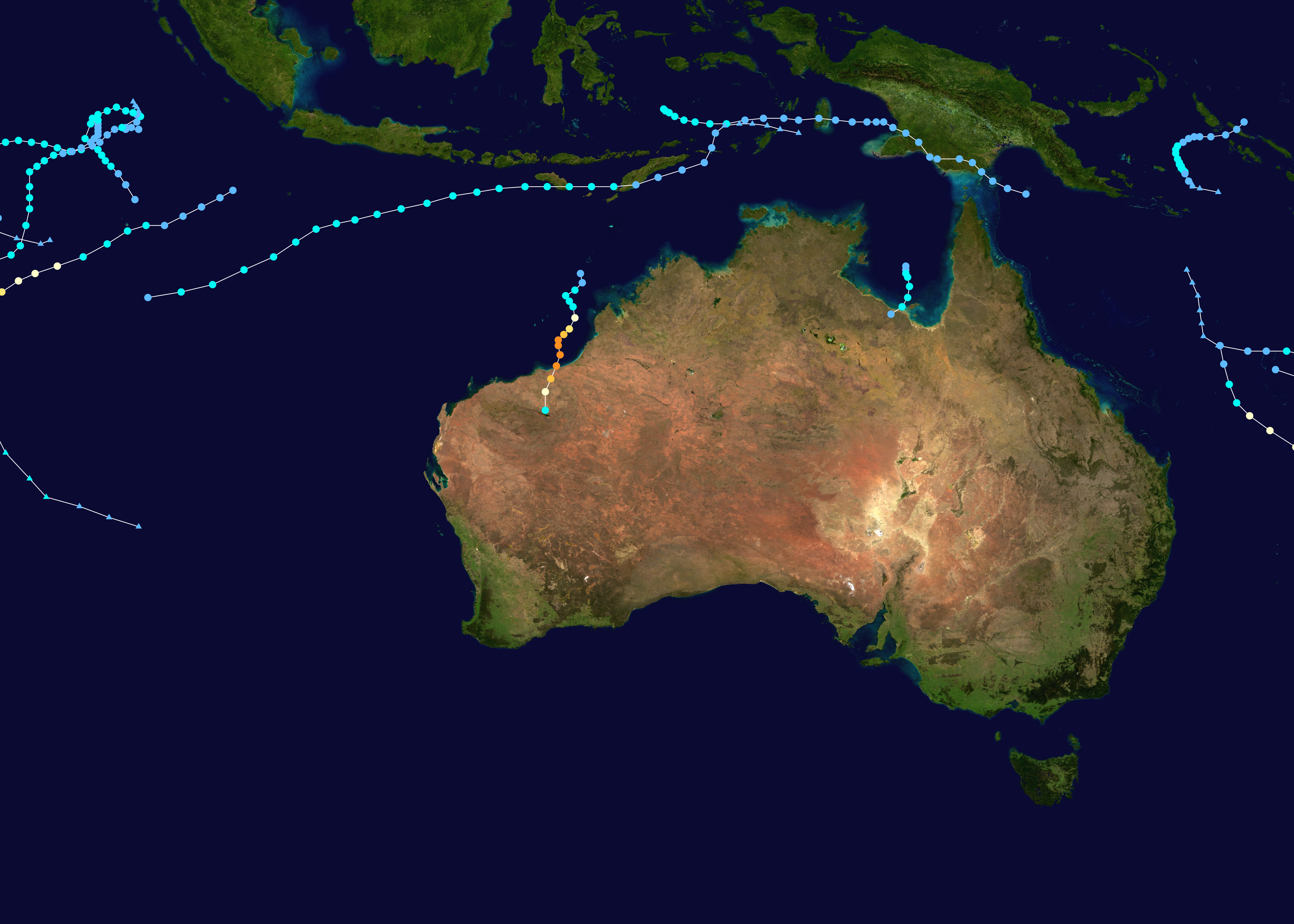
- Season summary map

Seasonal boundaries
- First system formed: 26 October 2001
- Last system dissipated: 29 May 2002

Strongest storm
- Name: Chris
  - Maximum winds: 205 km/h (125 mph) (10-minute sustained)
  - Lowest pressure: 915 hPa (mbar)

Seasonal statistics
- Tropical lows: 14
- Tropical cyclones: 10
- Severe tropical cyclones: 3
- Total fatalities: None
- Total damage: $929,000 (2002 USD)

Related articles
- 2001–02 South-West Indian Ocean cyclone season; 2001–02 South Pacific cyclone season

The 2001–02 Australian region cyclone season was a slightly below average tropical cyclone season. It officially started on 1 November 2001, and ended on 30 April 2002. However, the formation of Tropical Cyclone Alex on 26 October 2001 marked an earlier beginning to the season, and the season extended past the official end of the season when Tropical Cyclone Upia formed on 25 May 2002. The regional tropical cyclone operational plan also defines a "tropical cyclone year" separately from a "tropical cyclone season"; the "tropical cyclone year" began on 1 July 2001 and ended on 30 June 2002. The scope of the Australian region is limited to all areas south of the equator, east of 90°E and west of 160°E. This area includes Australia, Papua New Guinea, western parts of the Solomon Islands, East Timor and southern parts of Indonesia.

Tropical cyclones in this area are monitored by five Tropical Cyclone Warning Centres (TCWCs): the Australian Bureau of Meteorology in Perth, Darwin, and Brisbane; TCWC Jakarta in Indonesia; and TCWC Port Moresby in Papua New Guinea. The Joint Typhoon Warning Center issues unofficial warnings for the region, designating tropical depressions with the "S" suffix when they form west of 135°E, and the "P" suffix when they form east of 135°E.

== Systems ==
=== Tropical Cyclone Alex–Andre ===
- Category 2 tropical cyclone (Australian scale)
- Tropical storm (SSHWS)
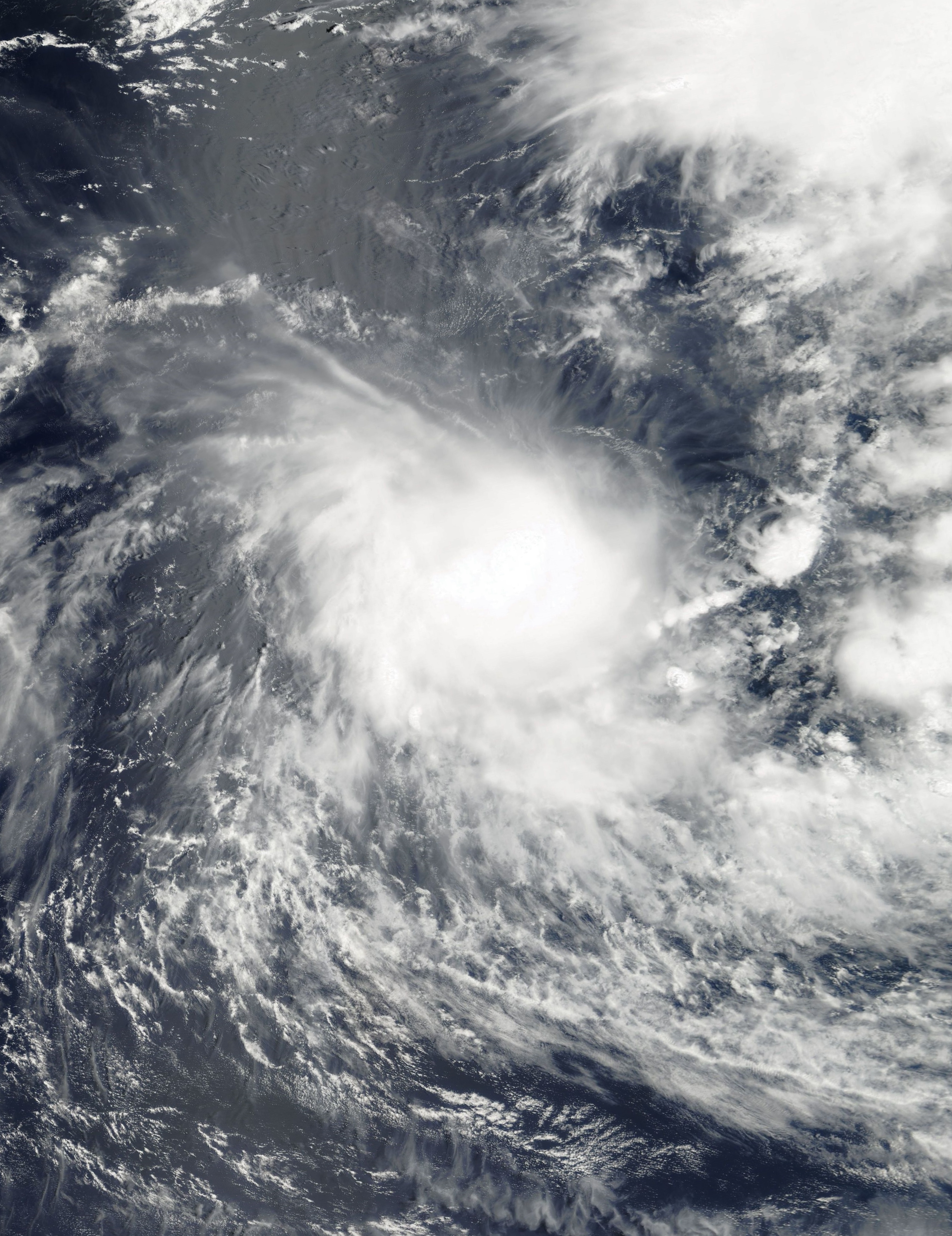
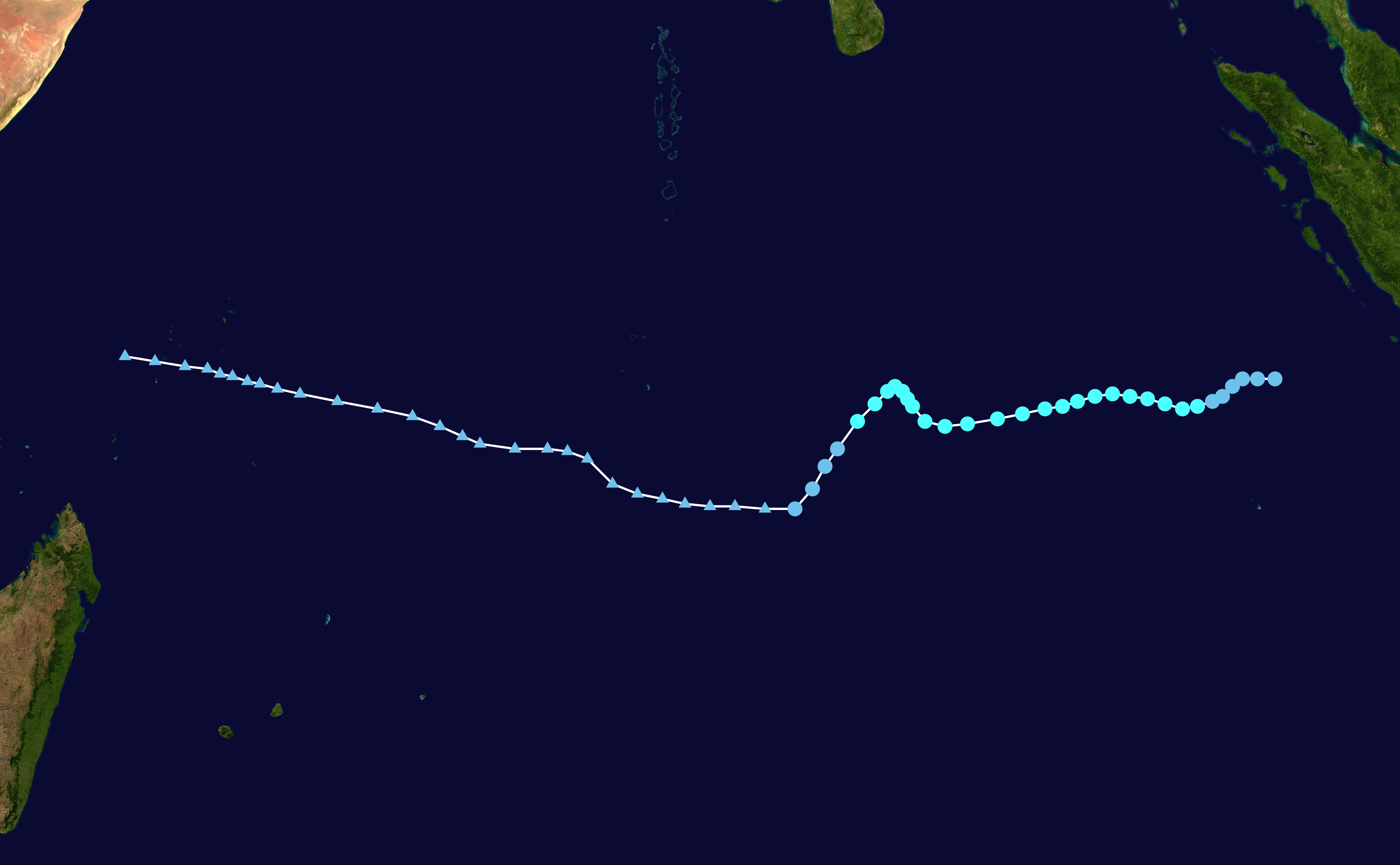
- Duration: 26 October – 28 October (Exited basin)
- Peak intensity: 95 km/h (60 mph) (10-min); 984 hPa (mbar)

Tropical Cyclone Alex began on 24 October 2001 when the Joint Typhoon Warning Center (JTWC) noted an area of convection developing southwest of Sumatra and north of Cocos (Keeling) Islands. On 25 October, the JTWC relocated the disturbance further west as it became better organised. The JTWC issued a Tropical Cyclone Formation Alert on the tropical low later that day. On 26 October, the Tropical Cyclone Warning Centre in Perth issued a gale warning on the system, forecasting further development. Three hours later, TCWC Perth upgraded the low to Tropical Cyclone Alex 555 km (345 mi) northwest of Cocos (Keeling) Islands. The JTWC followed suit, upgrading the low to tropical cyclone status in its first advisory. It moved slowly westward while upper-level wind shear prevented the storm from intensifying. However, late on 27 October, the storm's deep convection had become better organised and Perth raised Alex's peak winds to 95 km/h (59 mph). Alex continued to move to the west-southwest, steered by a mid-level ridge to the southeast. Alex moved west of 90°E into La Réunion's area of responsibility early on 28 October and was renamed Severe Tropical Storm Andre by Mauritius. Alex-Andre at this time reached its peak intensity, with Météo-France estimating 10-min sustained winds to be 55 kn, while the JTWC estimated 1-min sustained winds to be 55 kn as well; see 2001–02 South-West Indian Ocean cyclone season.

=== Tropical Low 03S ===
- Tropical low (Australian scale)
- Tropical storm (SSHWS)
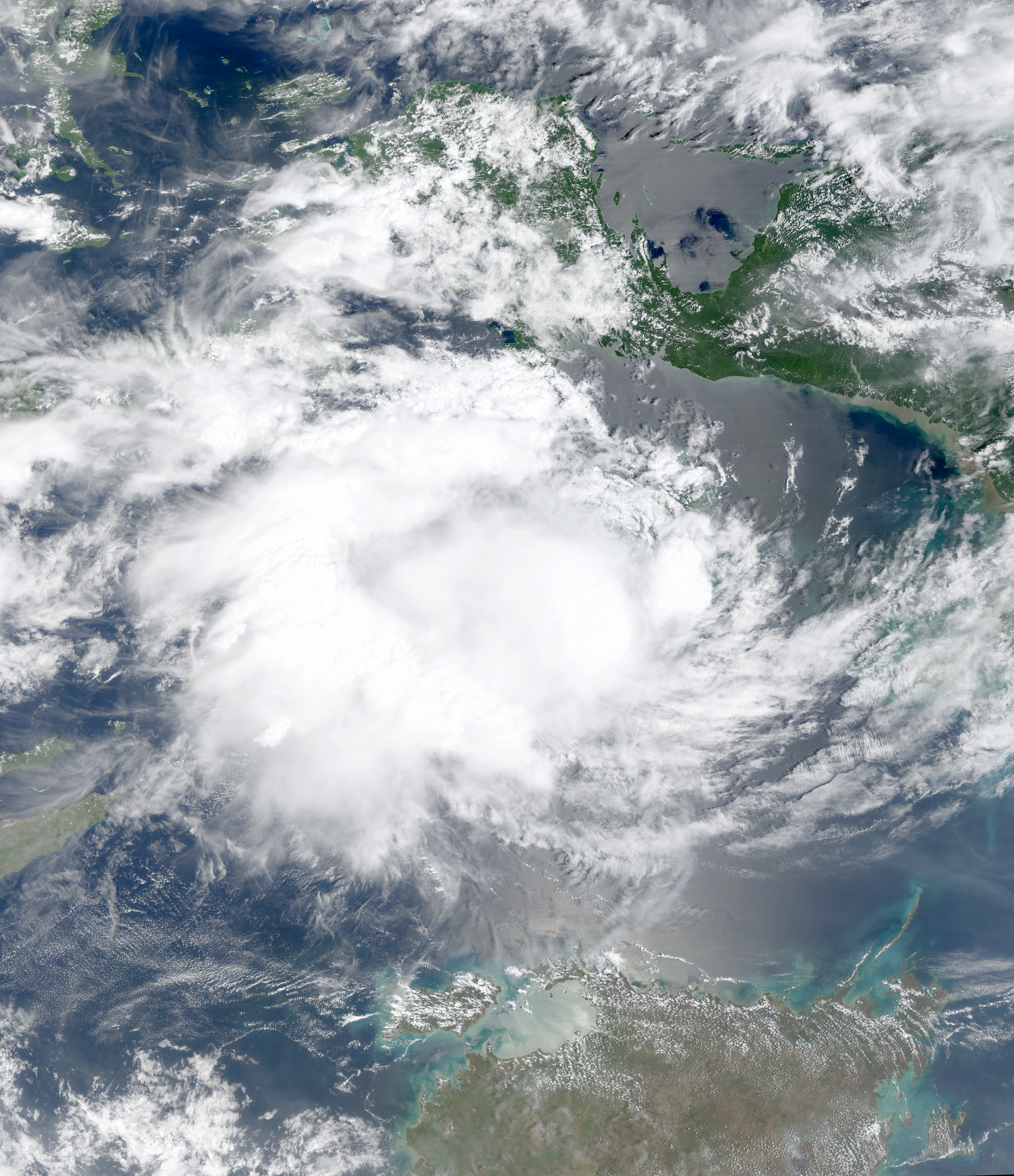
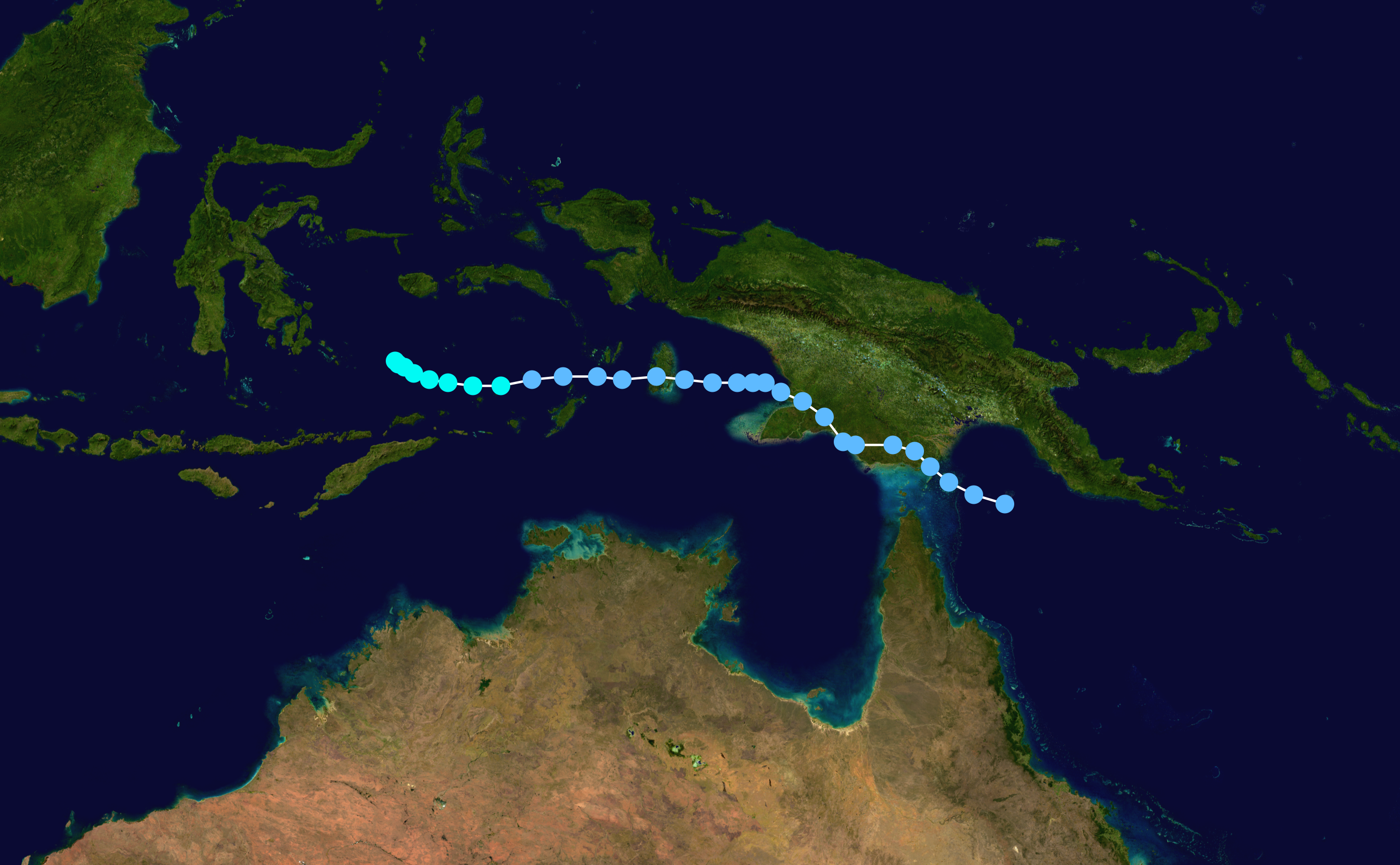
- Duration: 17 November – 22 November
- Peak intensity: 65 km/h (40 mph) (1-min); 997 hPa (mbar)

A monsoon trough present near the equator spawned a low near eastern New Guinea. The system tracked westward at a very low latitude. Convection rapidly built around the system because of its position near the axis of the ridge and the low vertical wind shear in the environment. The storm was mentioned by TCWC Darwin in the daily Tropical Weather Outlook on 15 November and given a low to moderate chance of developing into a tropical cyclone within 72 hours. On 17 November, tropical depression formed near southern Papua New Guinea.

By the 19th conditions were less favourable, and the JTWC indicated that convection was sheared to the west of the well-defined, yet weak, circulation centre. Up to this point, Darwin and JTWC were in agreement regarding the system's strength and its potential for development. However, JTWC issued their first Tropical Cyclone Formation Alert on 21 November, placing the system's center about 200 nm east-northeast of Timor. At 0600 UTC they upgraded the low to a weak tropical cyclone and issued their first warning. JTWC forecast slight strengthening which did not materialise. They issued their second and final warning at 1800 UTC. In their final best track, JTWC held the estimated tropical cyclone-strength intensity through the next day. Though the system was overland for some time, the damage it caused is unknown.

=== Tropical Cyclone Bessi–Bako ===
- Category 2 tropical cyclone (Australian scale)
- Tropical storm (SSHWS)
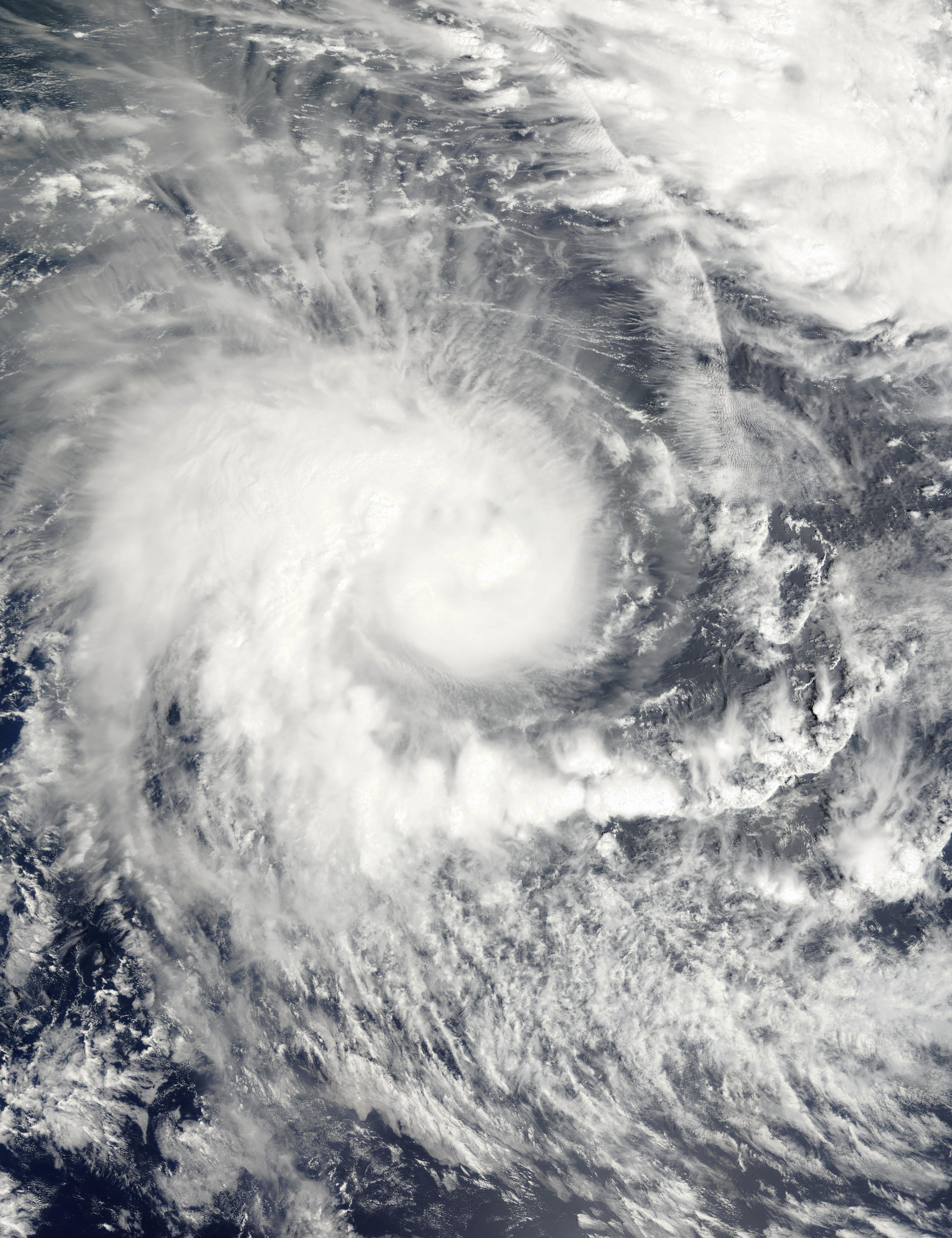
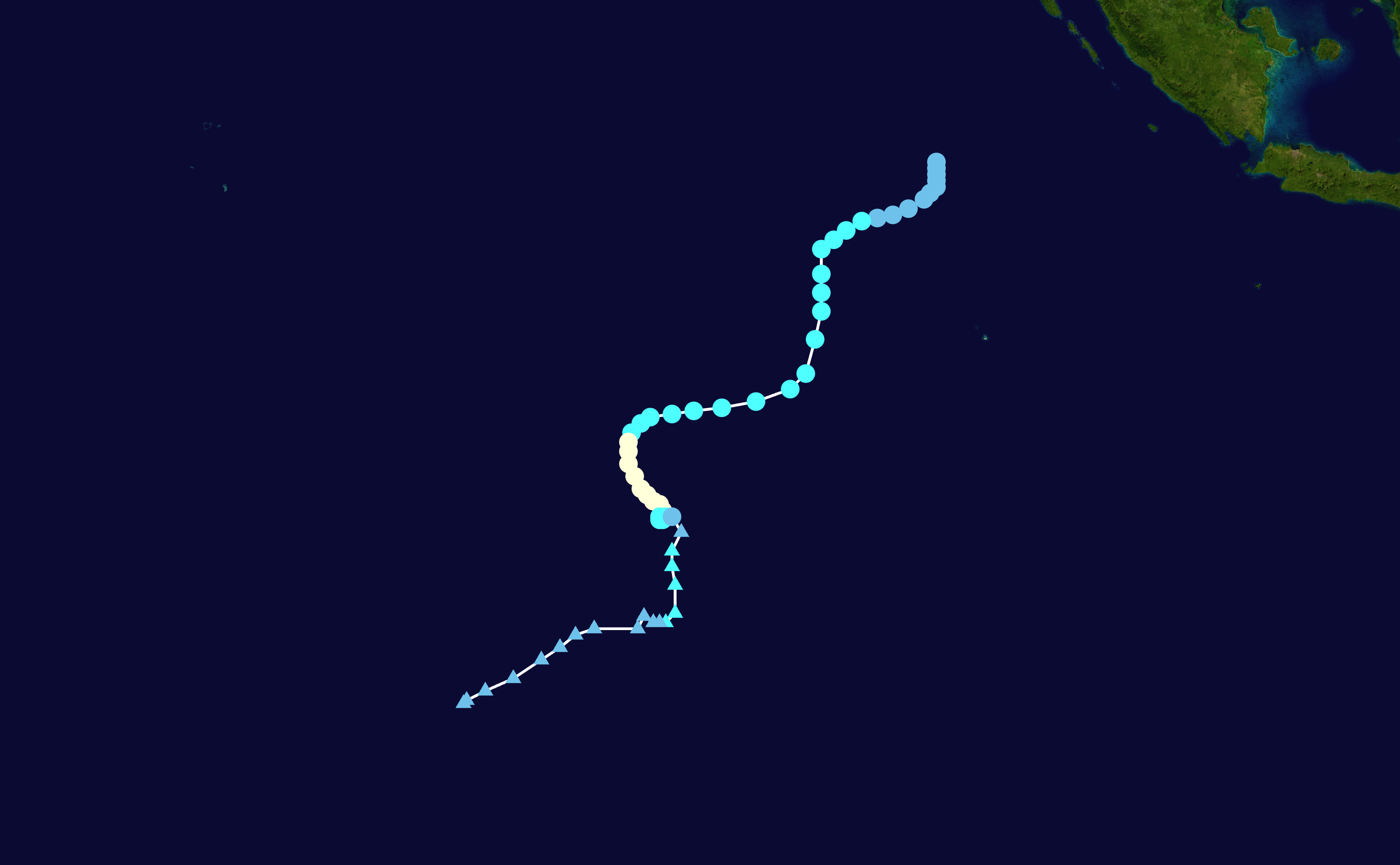
- Duration: 26 November – 30 November (Exited basin)
- Peak intensity: 100 km/h (65 mph) (10-min); 980 hPa (mbar)

An area of convection developed on 25 November 2001 southwest of Sumatra. The Joint Typhoon Warning Center (JTWC) issued a Tropical Cyclone Formation Alert (TCFA) on 26 November when the low continued to become better organised. At the same time, the Tropical Cyclone Warning Centre in Perth began releasing gale warnings for the storm, anticipating further development. Moderate wind shear prevented the low from intensifying, which made it necessary for the JTWC to issue another TCFA on 27 November. Shortly after, the JTWC issued their first warning on the storm, designating it 05S, while Perth upgraded the cyclone to Tropical Cyclone Bessi. At this time, the cyclone was located about 650 km (400 mi) northwest of Cocos (Keeling) Islands. Bessi was initially moving westwards, but turned to the south as a mid-level trough weakened the subtropical ridge which was steering the cyclone westwards. Bessi reached its first peak intensity of 110 km/h (68 mph) on 28 November while located 695 km (432 mi) west-northwest of Cocos Islands. It weakened thereafter as it moved into an area of high vertical wind shear. Bessi moved to the south-southeast on 29 November, then curved to the west on 30 November while weakening to 75 km/h (47 mph). It moved west of 90°E, entering La Réunion's area of responsibility, and was renamed Tropical Storm Bako. Cyclone Bessi-Bako later reached its peak intensity of 65 knots as estimated by Météo-France; see 2001–02 South-West Indian Ocean cyclone season.

=== Tropical Cyclone Bernie ===
- Category 2 tropical cyclone (Australian scale)
- Tropical storm (SSHWS)
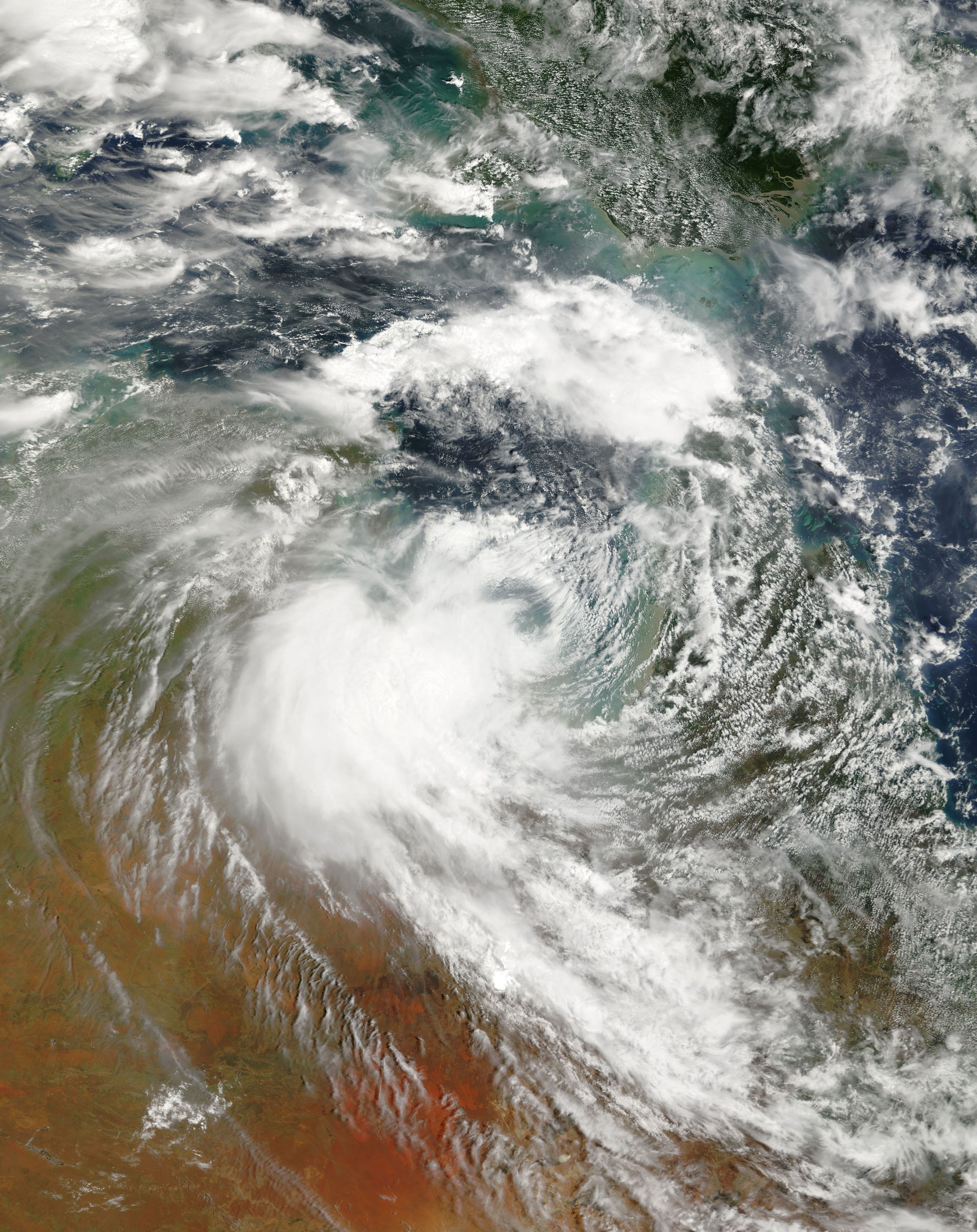
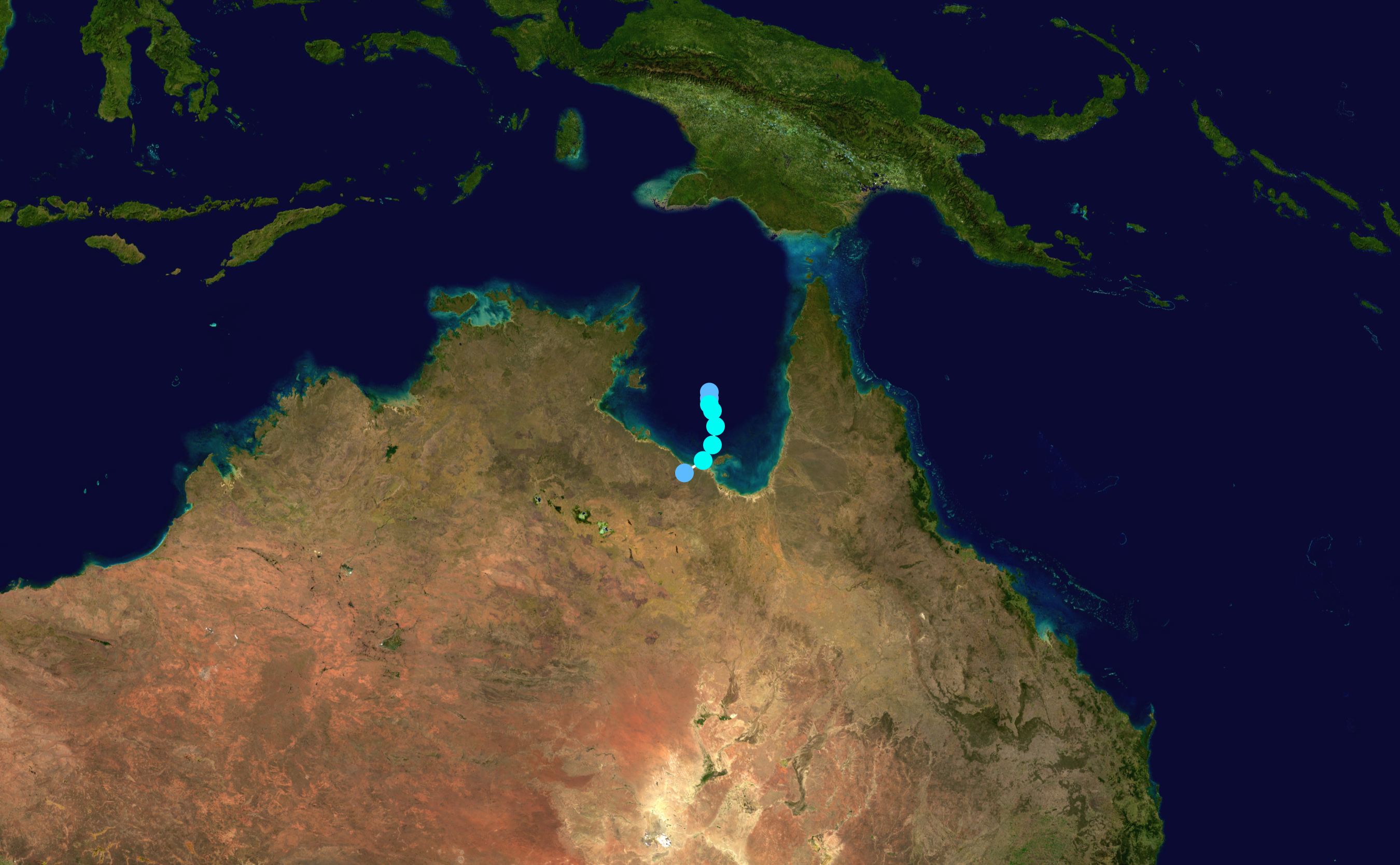
- Duration: 30 December – 6 January
- Peak intensity: 95 km/h (60 mph) (10-min); 980 hPa (mbar)

A weak tropical low developed in the Gulf of Carpentaria northeast of Nhulunbuy, Northern Territory on 30 December. It moved slowly to the south and intensified to Tropical Cyclone Bernie on 3 January. It peaked in intensity early the next day as a Category 2 cyclone, with wind gusts reaching 130 km/h (81 mph). Bernie was moving to the southwest and started to weaken, before crossing the coast near the borderline between Queensland and Northern Territory early on 5 January as a Category 1 cyclone. It weakened to a rain depression shortly after and continued to move southwards into the Barkly district on 6 January.

Early on 4 January, Bernie was close to making landfall over Mornington Island, and cyclone warnings were declared between the Northern Territory border and Kowanyama in Queensland. However, the cyclone warnings were shifted to the west later in the day for areas between Port McArthur in the Northern Territory and the Gilbert-Einasleigh River mouth in Queensland. As the cyclone neared the island, many residents in Mornington Island were moved to a more secure shelter. A few hours later, residents between Port McArthur and Karumba, Queensland were warned of a dangerous storm surge associated with Bernie.

Mornington Island recorded more than 300 mm (12 in) of precipitation in a 24‑hour period and experienced gusts of 100 km/h (62 mph). A few houses in the island lost power. However, only light damages occurred, and there were no casualties on the island. The town of Karumba also experienced heavy damage, with the storm surge damaging the beach. The towns Burketown and Doomadgee in Queensland were isolated for two weeks due to flooded roads.

Pastoralists in the Gulf country were anticipating high rainfall from Bernie, but only received low rainfall. Further south in Roma, Queensland, the rains helped lift up the prices in the cattle market. People in inland areas of the Gulf country were hit by bushfires in November and December 2001 and were anticipating the arrival of Bernie, hoping that it will bring rain to extinguish the fires. However, Bernie delivered very little rain to the area.

=== Severe Tropical Cyclone Chris ===
- Category 5 severe tropical cyclone (Australian scale)
- Category 4 tropical cyclone (SSHWS)
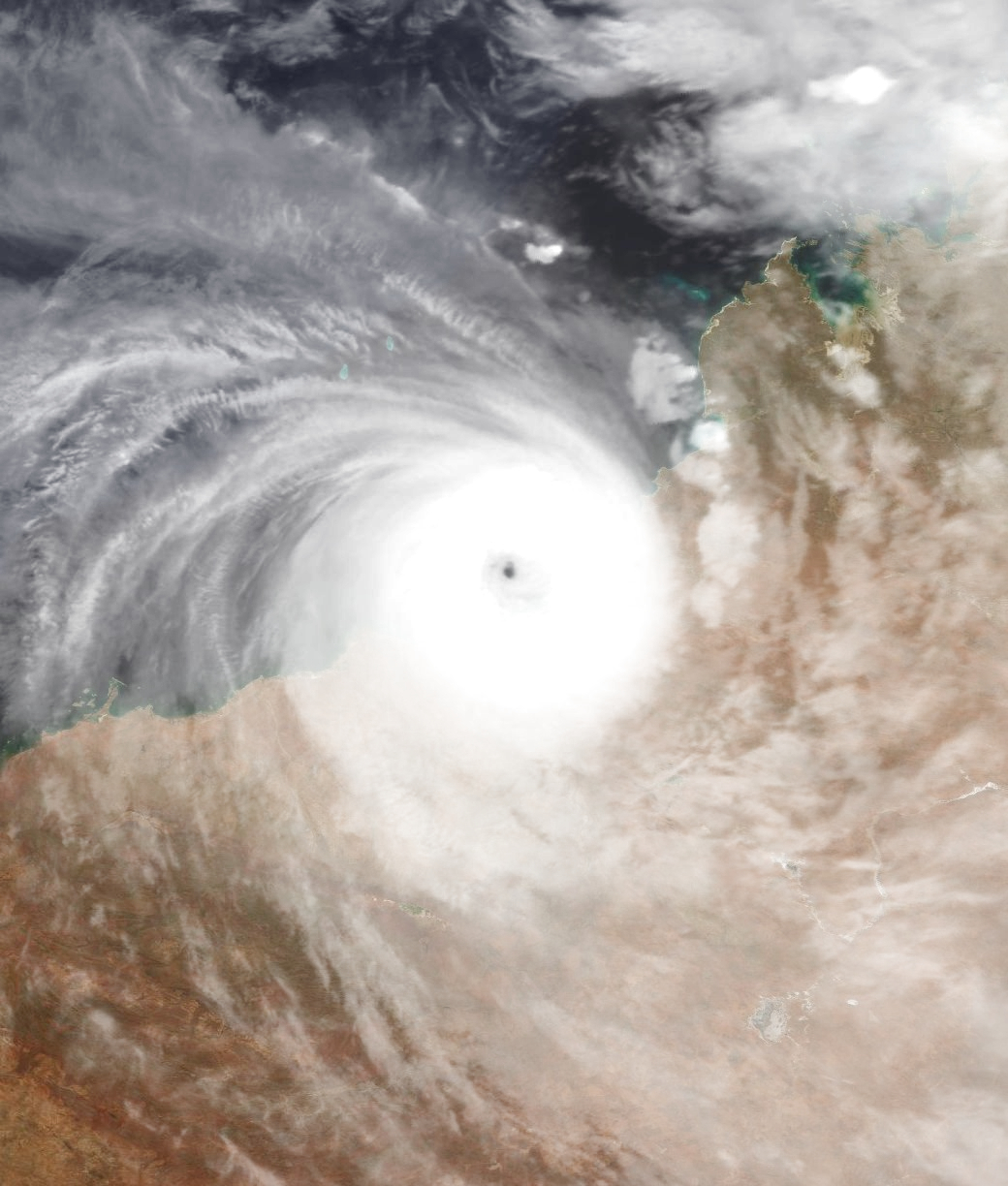
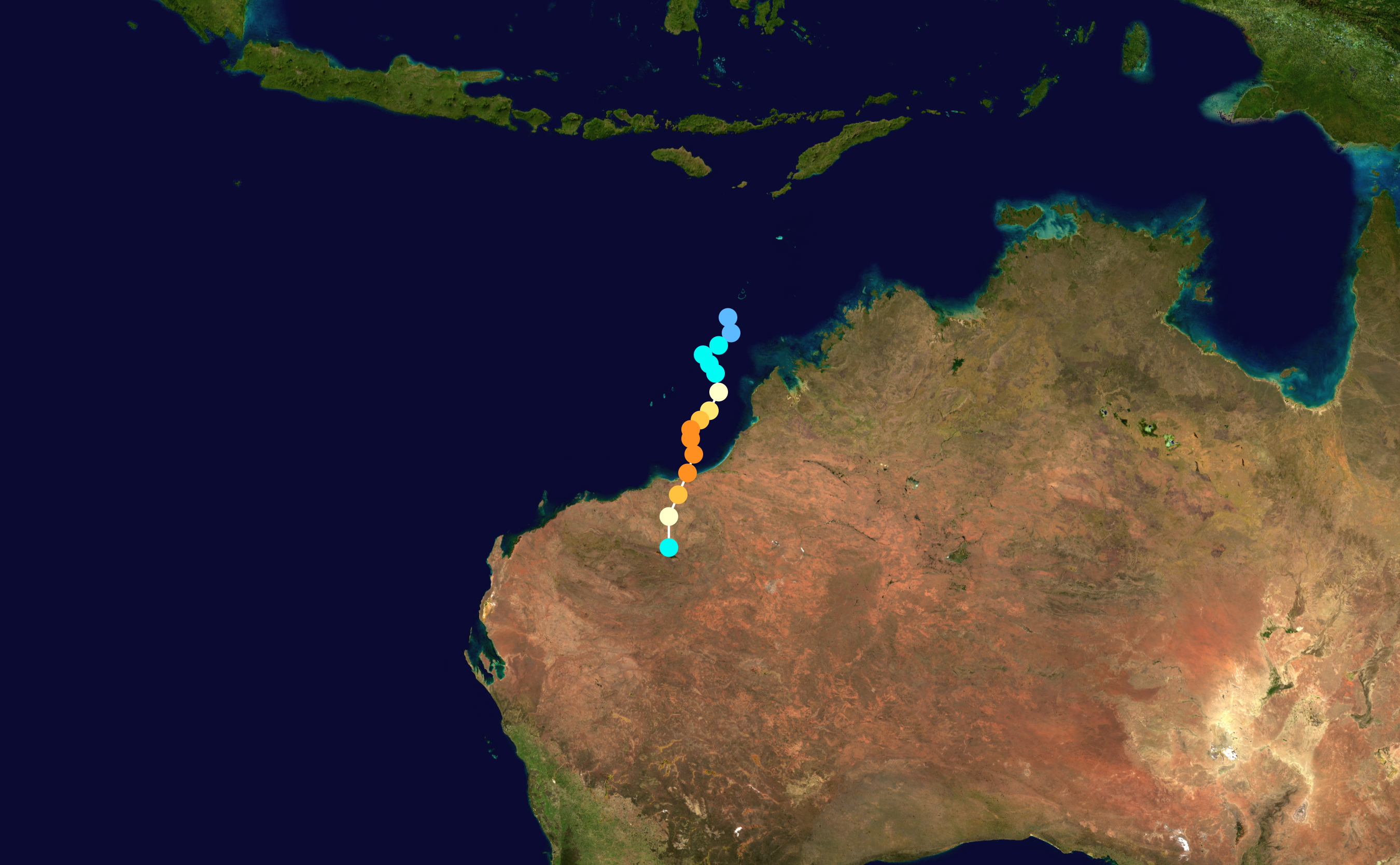
- Duration: 2 February – 6 February
- Peak intensity: 205 km/h (125 mph) (10-min); 915 hPa (mbar)

Severe Tropical Cyclone Chris developed on 2 February off the north Western Australia coast. The storm peaked with 230 km/h (140 mph) winds before making landfall to the east of Port Hedland, Western Australia and dissipated overland on 6 February. Chris was responsible for some inland flooding.

=== Severe Tropical Cyclone Claudia ===
- Category 3 severe tropical cyclone (Australian scale)
- Category 1 tropical cyclone (SSHWS)
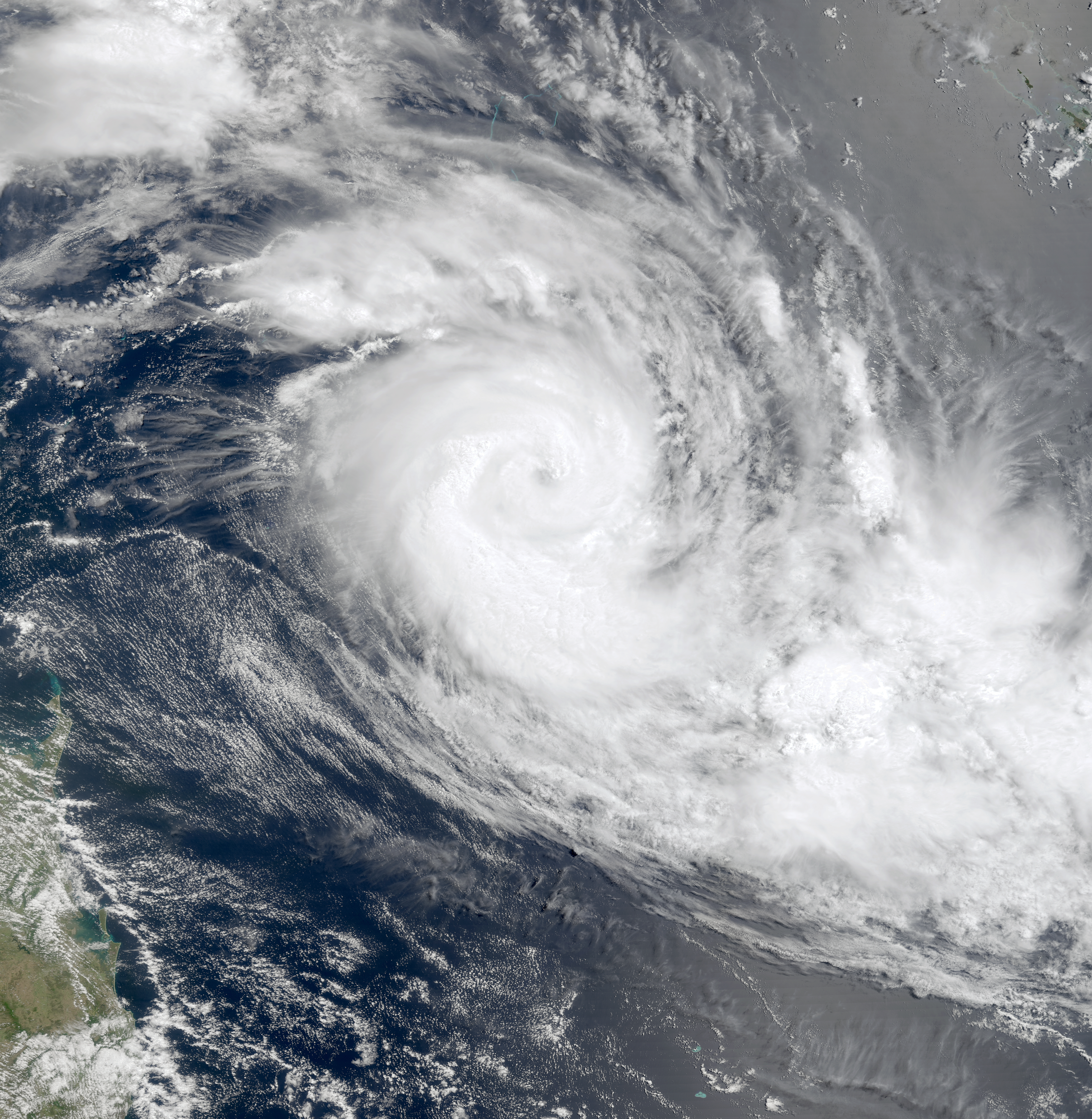
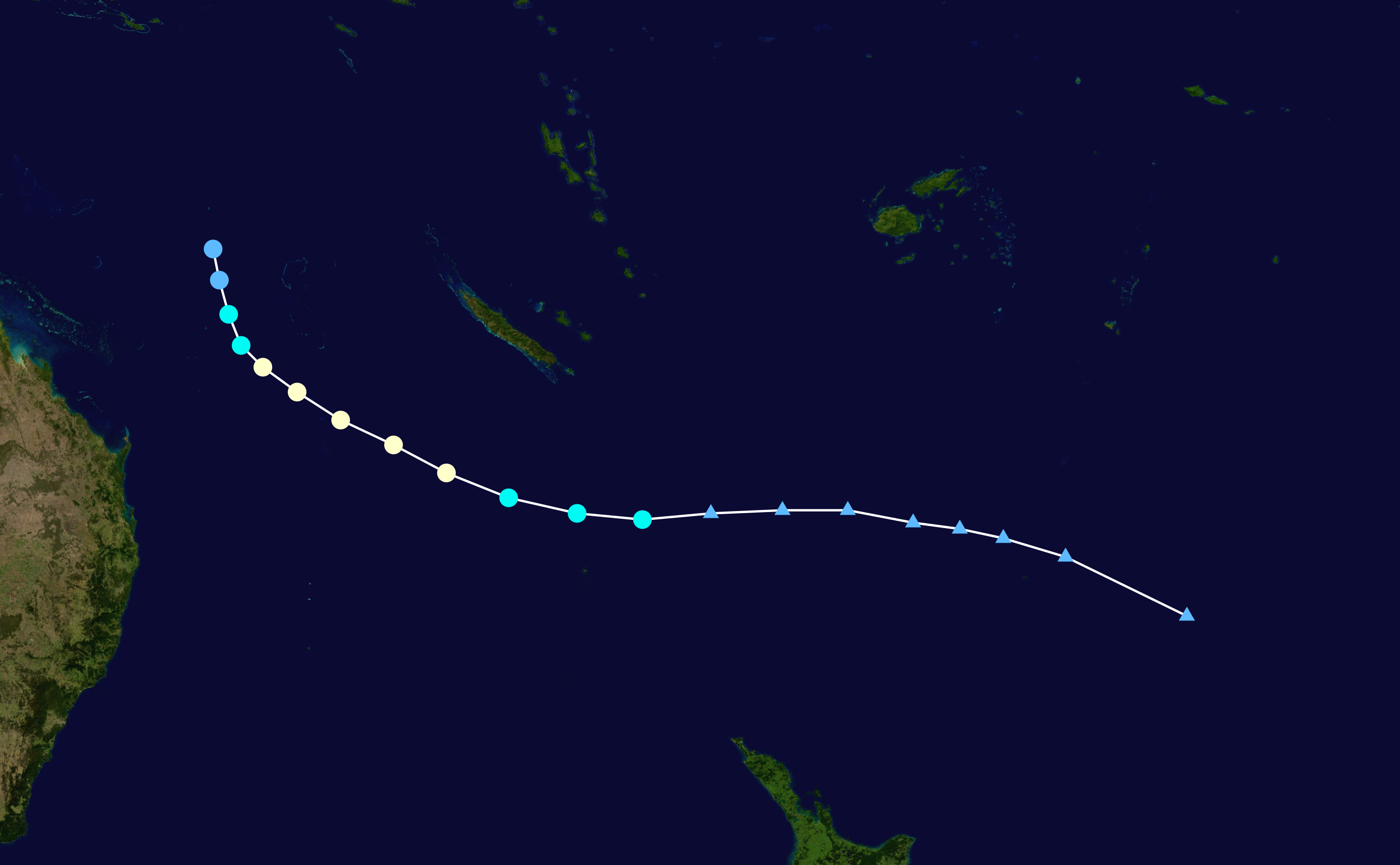
- Duration: 11 February – 12 February (Exited basin)
- Peak intensity: 130 km/h (80 mph) (10-min); 965 hPa (mbar)

The origins of Claudia came from an area of convection which formed 1,020 km (630 mi) east-southeast of Port Moresby, Papua New Guinea on 9 February 2002. The system did not develop further until on 11 February where it began to develop rapidly. The Tropical Cyclone Warning Centre (TCWC) in Brisbane identified the storm as a tropical low 990 km (620 mi) east of Townsville, Queensland, while the Joint Typhoon Warning Center (JTWC) issued a Tropical Cyclone Formation Alert for the system. A couple hours later, the low was upgraded to Tropical Cyclone Claudia by TCWC Brisbane, while the JTWC also upgraded the storm to tropical cyclone status, designating it as Tropical Cyclone 14P. Later that day, the JTWC upped Claudia's peak winds to 120 km/h (75 mph), after a well-defined eye was spotted in infrared imagery. The very small cyclone was moving southeastwards and continued to rapidly intensify due to good outflow. Early on 12 February, TCWC Brisbane upgraded Claudia to a Category 3 severe tropical cyclone, with estimated peak winds of 120 km/h (75 mph), while the JTWC estimated peak winds of 140 km/h (87 mph). Claudia was moving quickly to the southeast towards Fiji's area of responsibility and TCWC Brisbane its last warning for Claudia later that day when it moved east of 160°E out of TCWC Brisbane's area of responsibility; see 2001–02 South Pacific cyclone season.

=== Tropical Cyclone Des ===
- Category 1 tropical cyclone (Australian scale)
- Tropical storm (SSHWS)
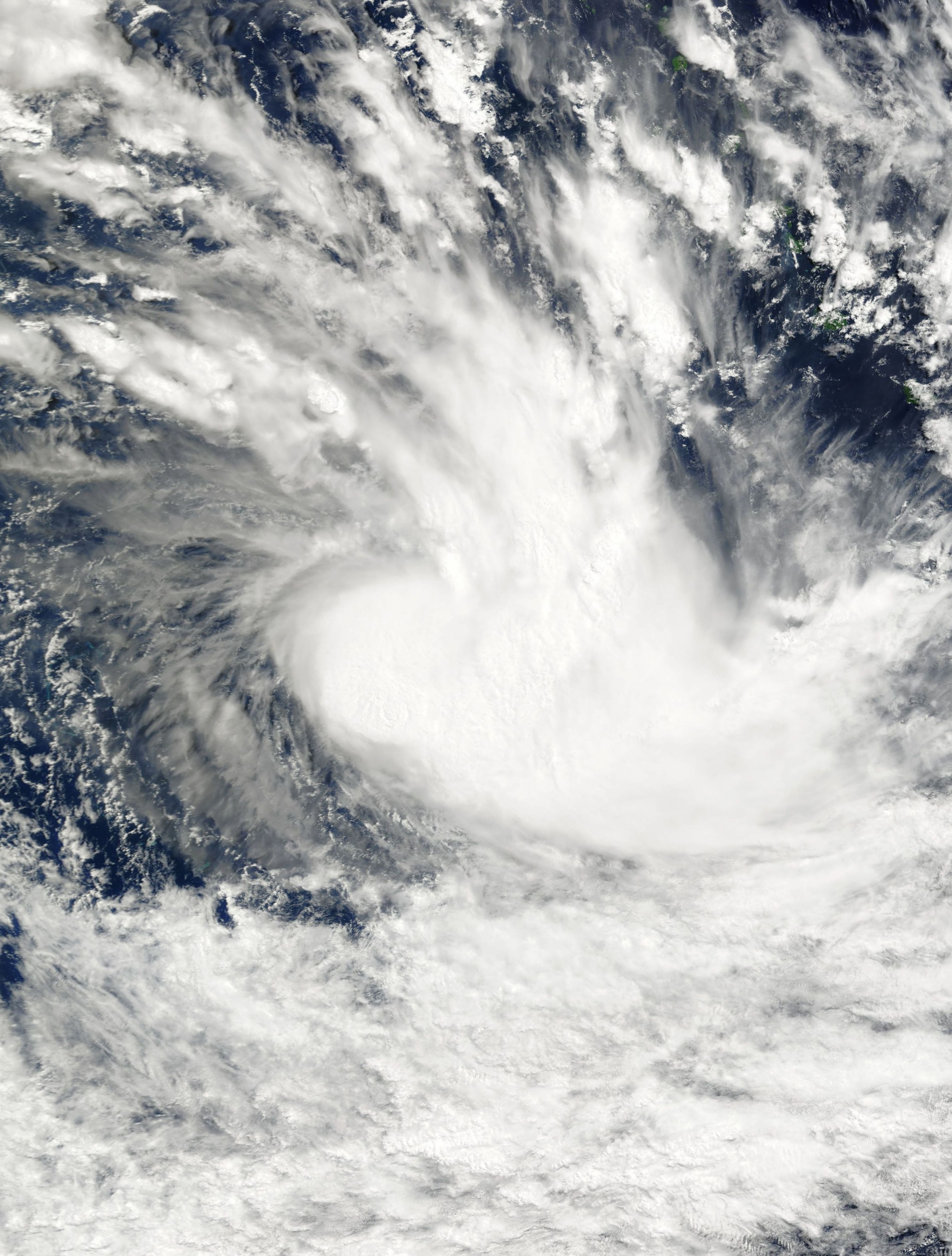
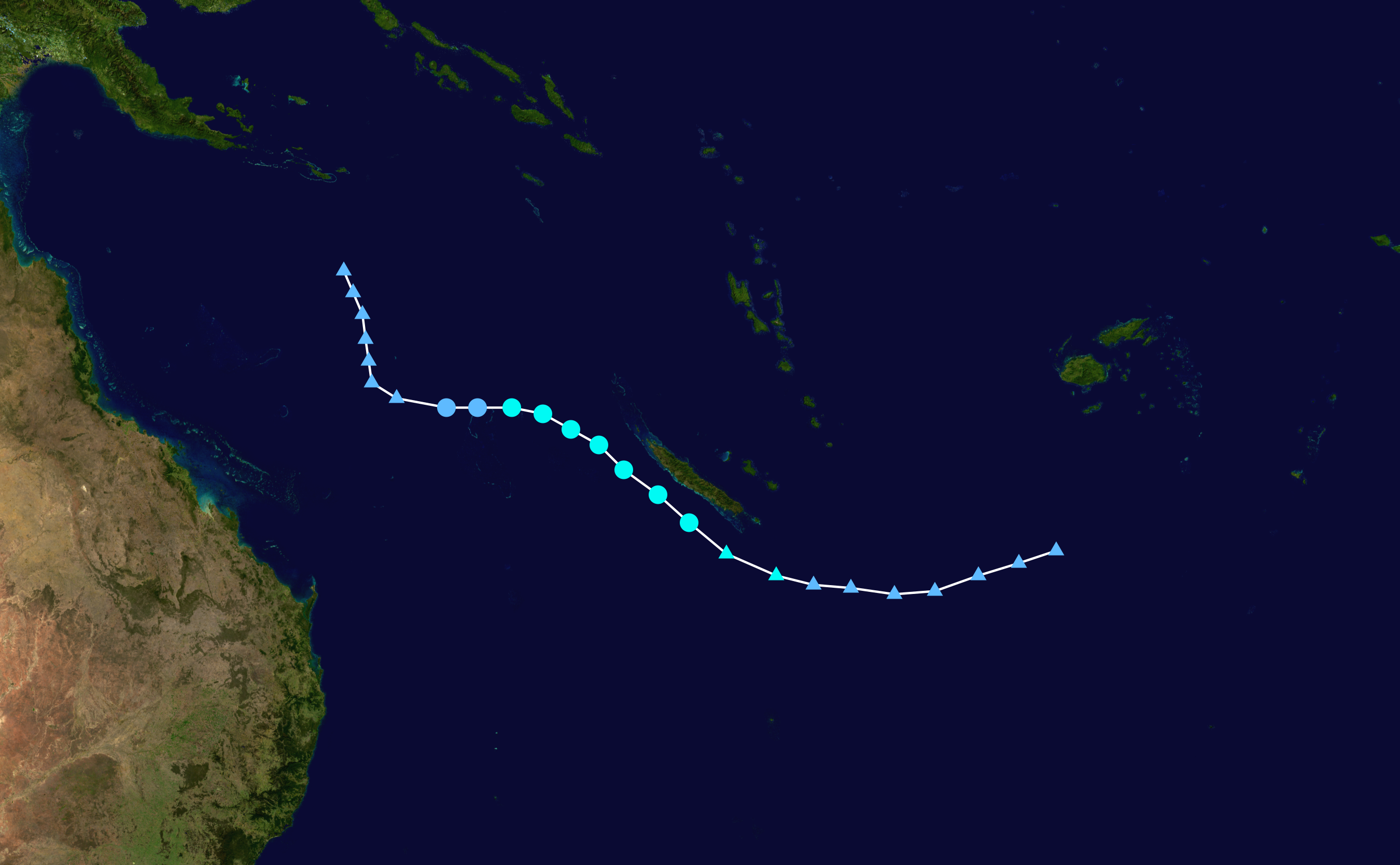
- Duration: 4 March – 7 March
- Peak intensity: 85 km/h (50 mph) (10-min); 998 hPa (mbar)

Tropical Cyclone Des originated from an area of convection which formed on 3 March 835 km (519 mi) east-southeast of Port Moresby, Papua New Guinea. Late on 4 March, the Tropical Cyclone Warning Centre (TCWC) in Brisbane initiated warnings for the tropical low as the system's convection deepened. The Joint Typhoon Warning Center (JTWC) issued a Tropical Cyclone Formation Alert for the storm, and later upgraded it to Tropical Cyclone 17P at 0600 UTC on 5 March. The cyclone was moving to the east-southeast, steered by a low to mid-level ridge east of the storm. Favourable conditions and good outflow enabled the cyclone to strengthen, and TCWC Brisbane upgraded it to Tropical Cyclone Des at 0900 UTC on the same day with peak winds of 75 km/h (47 mph). At the time of upgrade, Des was located only 55 km (34 mi) west of 160°E, near the border between Brisbane's and Nadi's respective areas of responsibility. Warnings were issued by RSMC Nadi thereafter as the cyclone continued to move to the southeast; see 2001–02 South Pacific cyclone season.

=== Severe Tropical Cyclone Dianne–Jery ===
- Category 3 severe tropical cyclone (Australian scale)
- Category 2 tropical cyclone (SSHWS)
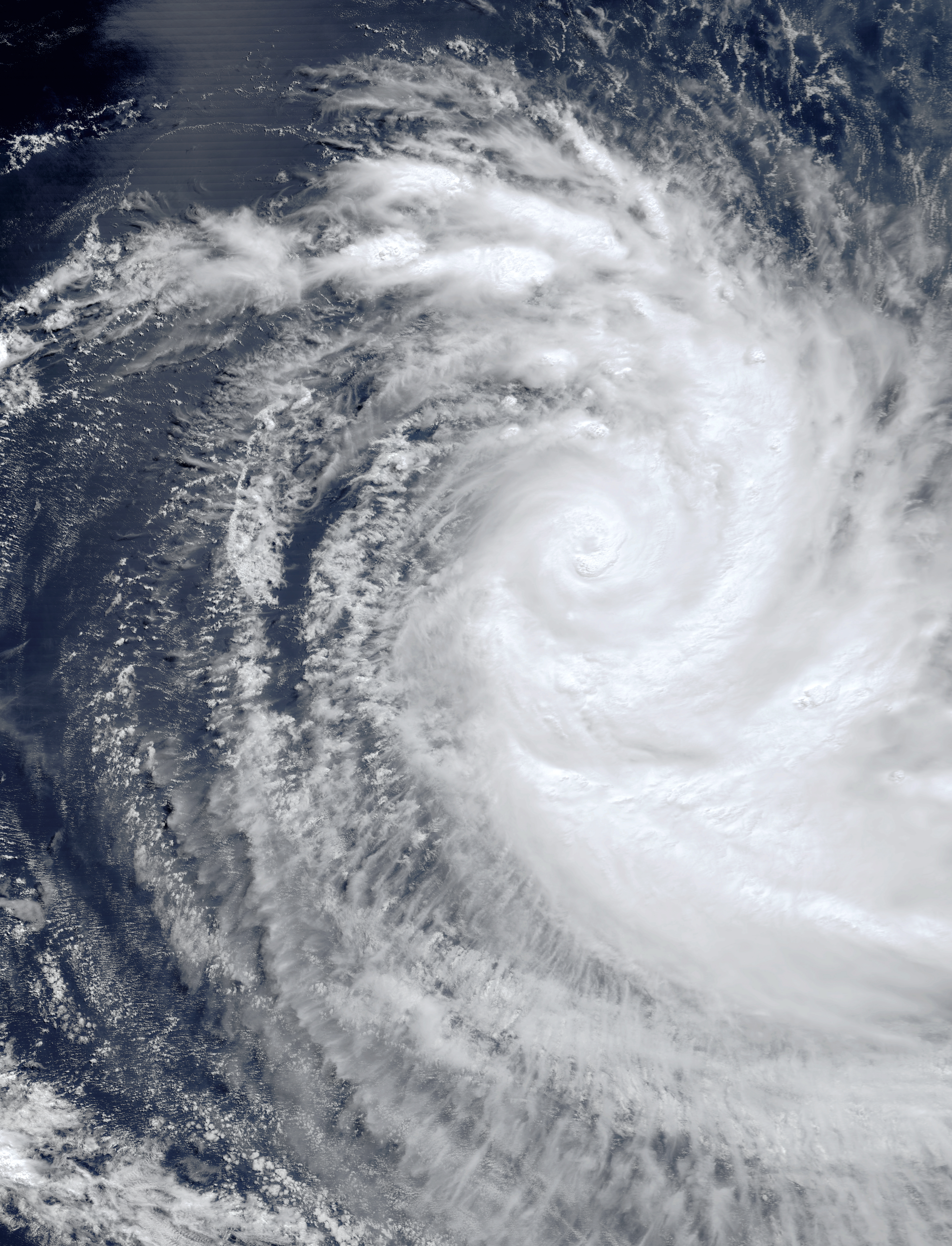
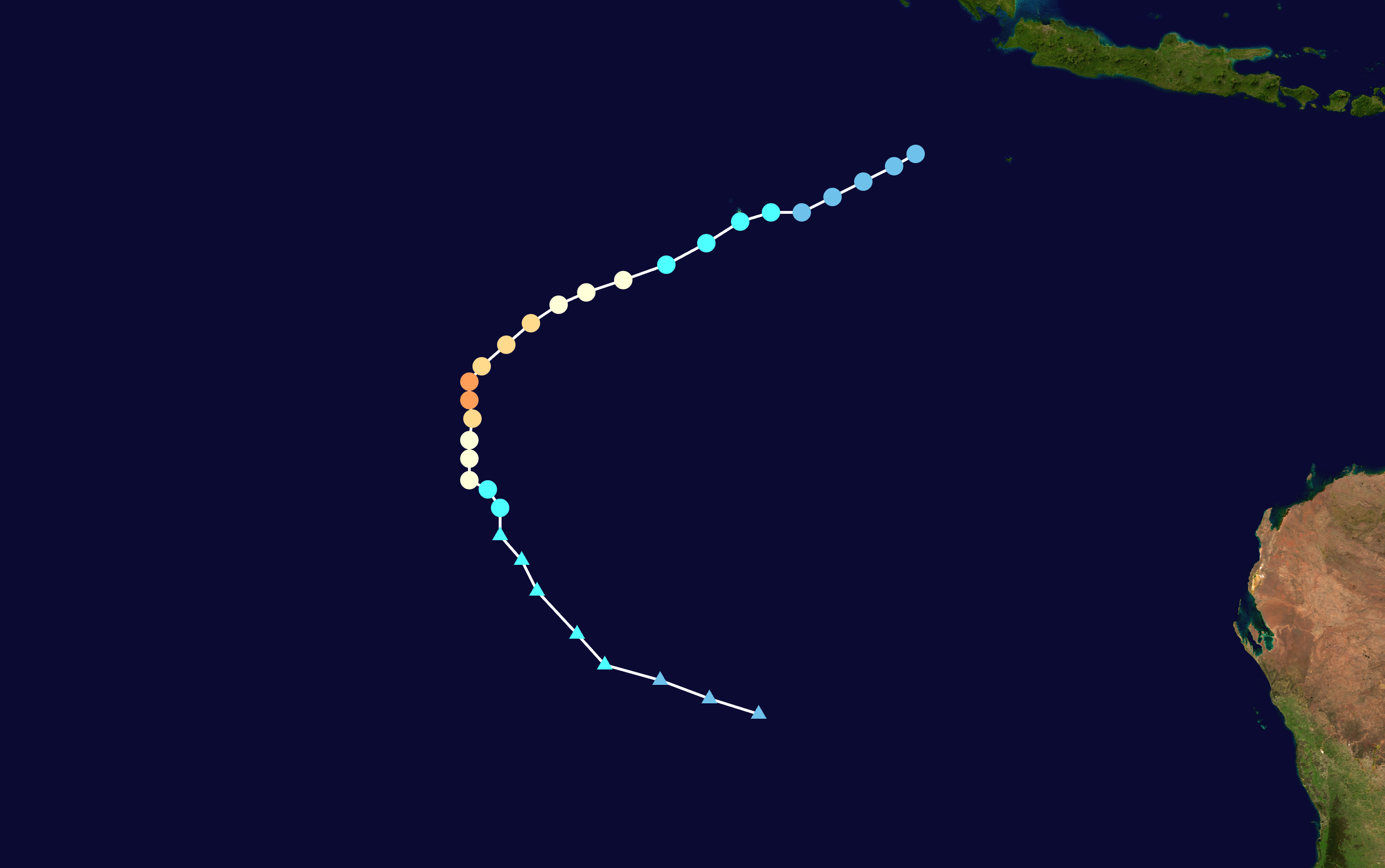
- Duration: 7 April – 9 April (Exited basin)
- Peak intensity: 150 km/h (90 mph) (10-min); 955 hPa (mbar)

Cyclone Dianne formed after a long period of cyclone inactivity off northwestern Australia and in the Southeast Indian Ocean since Cyclone Chris in early February. On 4 April 2002 an area of convection developed 350 km (220 mi) northeast of Cocos (Keeling) Islands. The system intensified under favourable conditions and outflow improved over the storm. The Joint Typhoon Warning Center (JTWC) issued a Tropical Cyclone Formation Alert on 6 April for the system, and upgraded it to Tropical Cyclone 21S on 7 April, when convection deepened rapidly over the storm. It moved west-southwestward, influenced by a mid-level ridge which extended from the Australian west coast. As the cyclone edged closer to the Cocos Islands, a cyclone warning was issued by the Tropical Cyclone Warning Centre in Perth for possible gale-force winds developing over the islands. TCWC Perth issued its first gale warning for the developing cyclone at 0300 UTC on 7 April, and upgraded it to Tropical Cyclone Dianne just two hours later with peak winds of 85 km/h (53 mph). Although Dianne passed about 30 km south of the islands, no gale-force winds were reported there. Dianne moved away from the Cocos Islands, and intensified further, developing a banding eye feature. Early on 8 April, the JTWC upgraded Dianne from tropical storm to tropical cyclone status with peak winds of 120 km/h (75 mph), equivalent to a minimal hurricane. Later that day, TCWC Perth followed suit, upgrading Dianne to a Category 3 severe tropical cyclone with peak winds of 140 km/h (87 mph). Dianne continued moving to the west-southwest and crossed the boundary at 90°E into La Réunion's area of responsibility and was renamed Tropical Cyclone Jery by the Mauritius Meteorological Service; see 2001–02 South-West Indian Ocean cyclone season.

=== Tropical Cyclone Bonnie ===
- Category 2 tropical cyclone (Australian scale)
- Tropical storm (SSHWS)
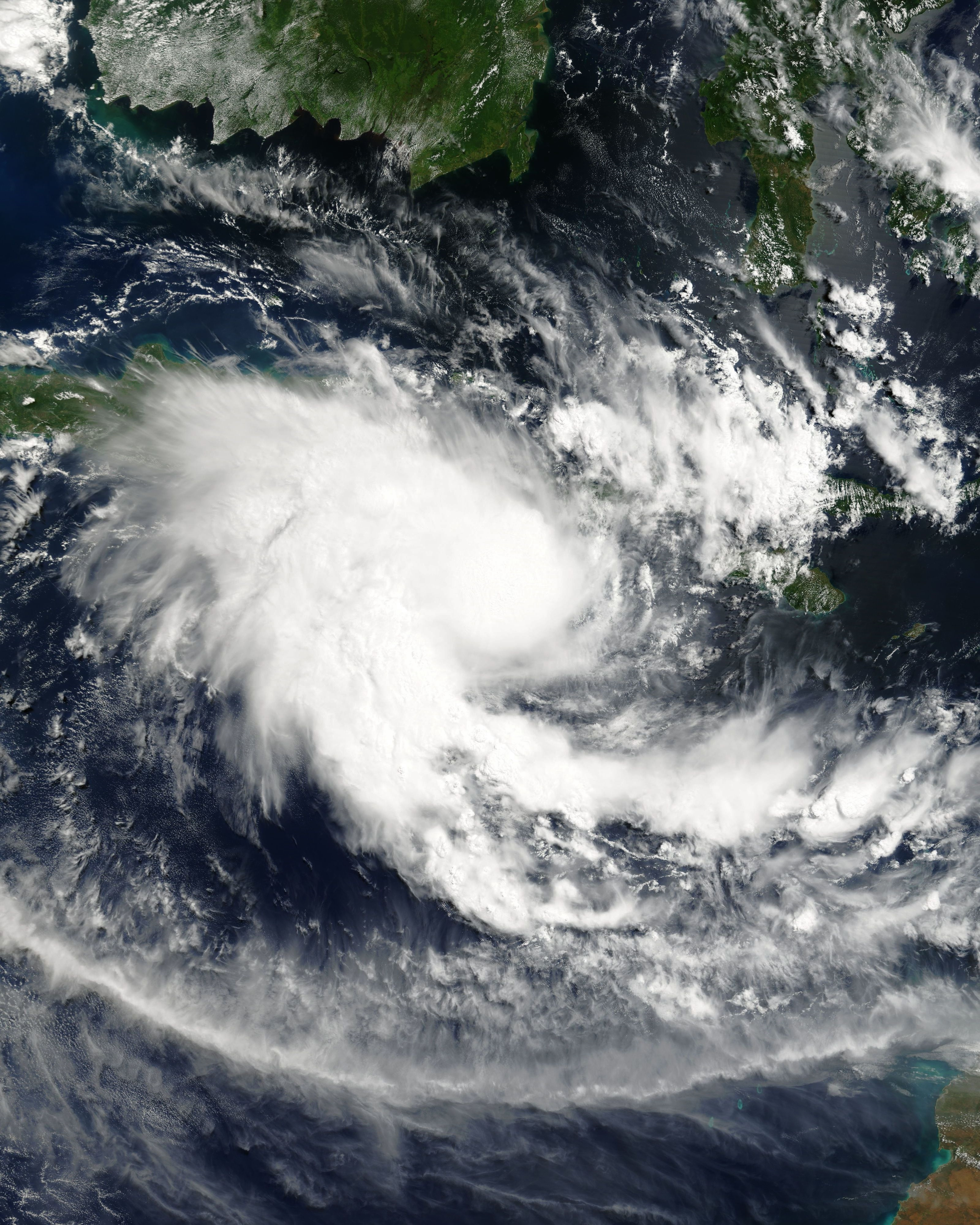
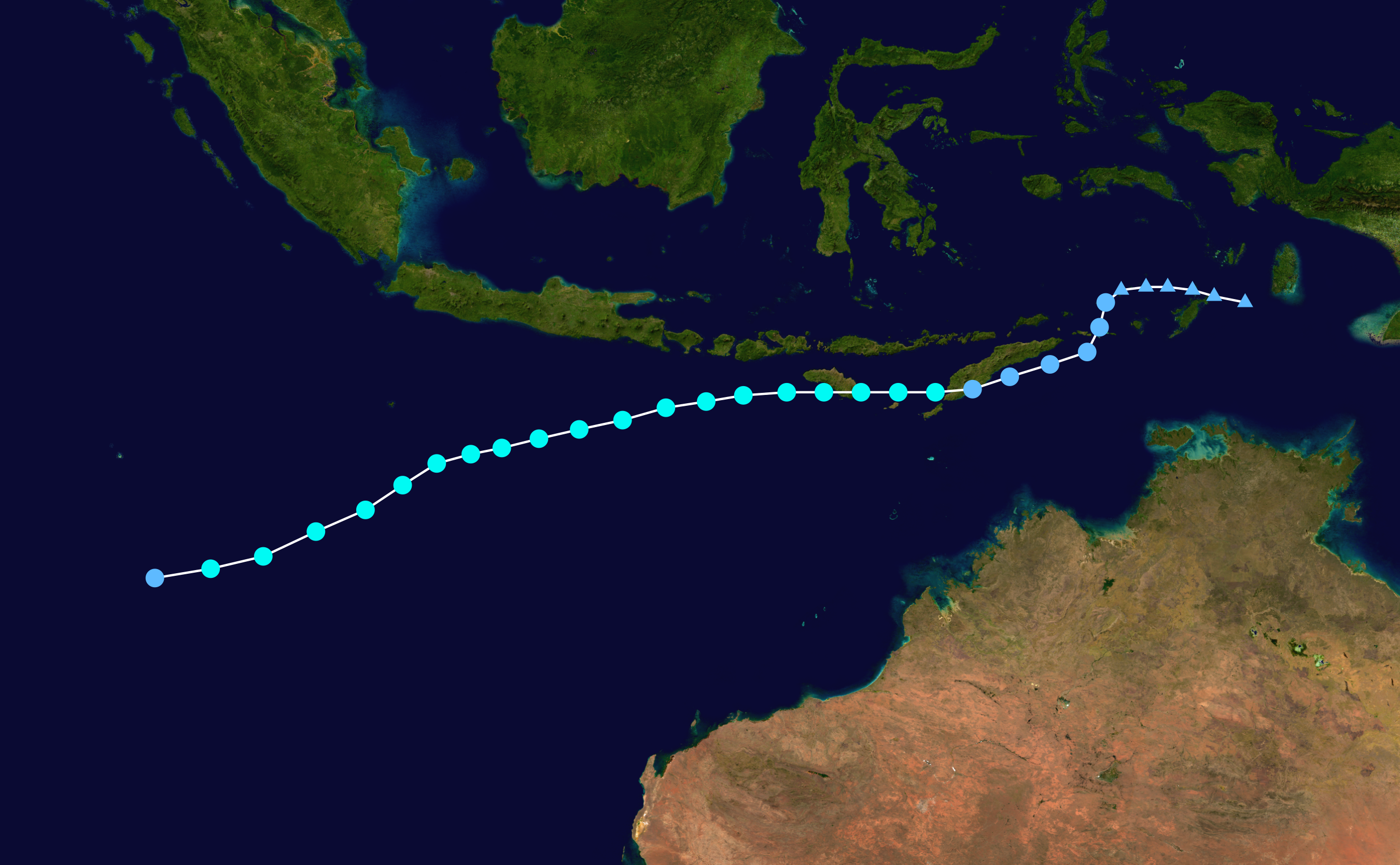
- Duration: 9 April – 14 April
- Peak intensity: 95 km/h (60 mph) (10-min); 985 hPa (mbar)

An area of convection formed 600 km (370 mi) northeast of Darwin, Northern Territory on 7 April. An increase in deep convection occurred late on 9 April, with the Joint Typhoon Warning Center (JTWC) issuing a Tropical Cyclone Formation Alert for the developing system. At this time, the Tropical Cyclone Warning Centre (TCWC) in Darwin initiated gale warnings for the tropical low, but it was upgraded to Tropical Cyclone Bonnie six hours later, 240 km (150 mi) east of Timor. Bonnie was moving west-southwestwards and made landfall on the Timorese coast on 10 April. The cyclone entered TCWC Perth's area of warning responsibility as it moved west of 125°E. Land interaction inhibited the storm from developing, but the cyclone later moved into the Savu Sea where good outflow enabled the storm to strengthen. Bonnie later moved over the south coast of Sumba on 11 April where the land mass weakened the storm again. After moving over water for the second time on 12 April, TCWC Perth and the JTWC increased Bonnie's peak winds to 95 km/h (59 mph). Bonnie continued to move west-southwestwards but the storm began to slowly weaken as its deep convection decreased and interacted with the island of Java. TCWC Perth issued its last gale warning on Bonnie late on 14 April. The JTWC continued to issue advisories on the low until late on 15 April 465 km (289 mi) south-southeast of Cocos (Keeling) Islands.

Bonnie caused heavy rainfall and gusty winds in Timor and Sumba. Flash flooding in Sumba killed 19 people. Bonnie also caused a moist northeast wind flow that triggered above average rainfall to northern Western Australia.

=== Tropical Cyclone Errol ===
- Category 1 tropical cyclone (Australian scale)
- Tropical storm (SSHWS)
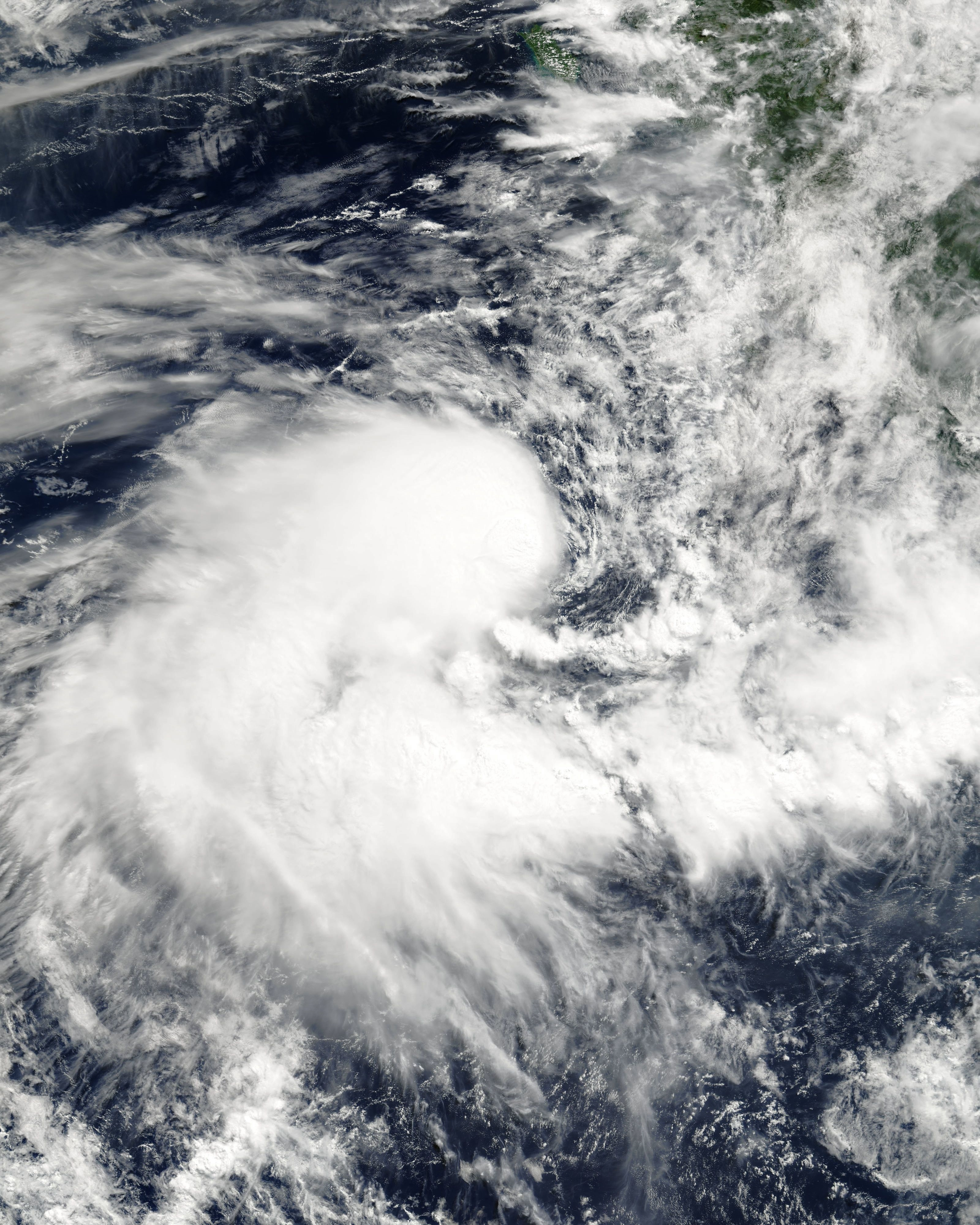
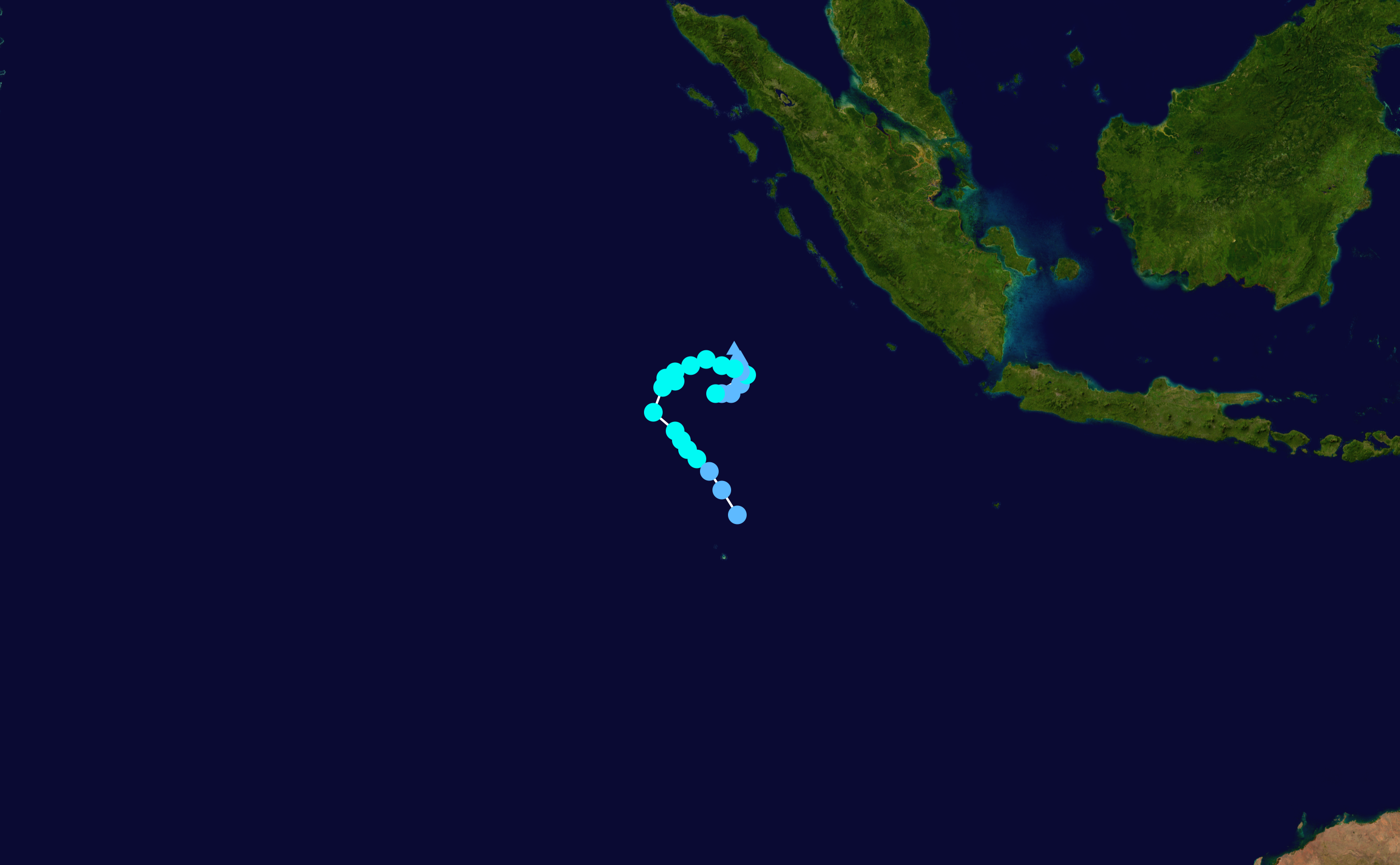
- Duration: 9 May – 15 May
- Peak intensity: 65 km/h (40 mph) (10-min); 995 hPa (mbar)

Briefly attained tropical cyclone intensity 9–10 May north of Cocos Islands, and later passed to their east on 15 May as a weak tropical low.

=== Tropical Cyclone Upia ===
- Category 1 tropical cyclone (Australian scale)
- Tropical storm (SSHWS)
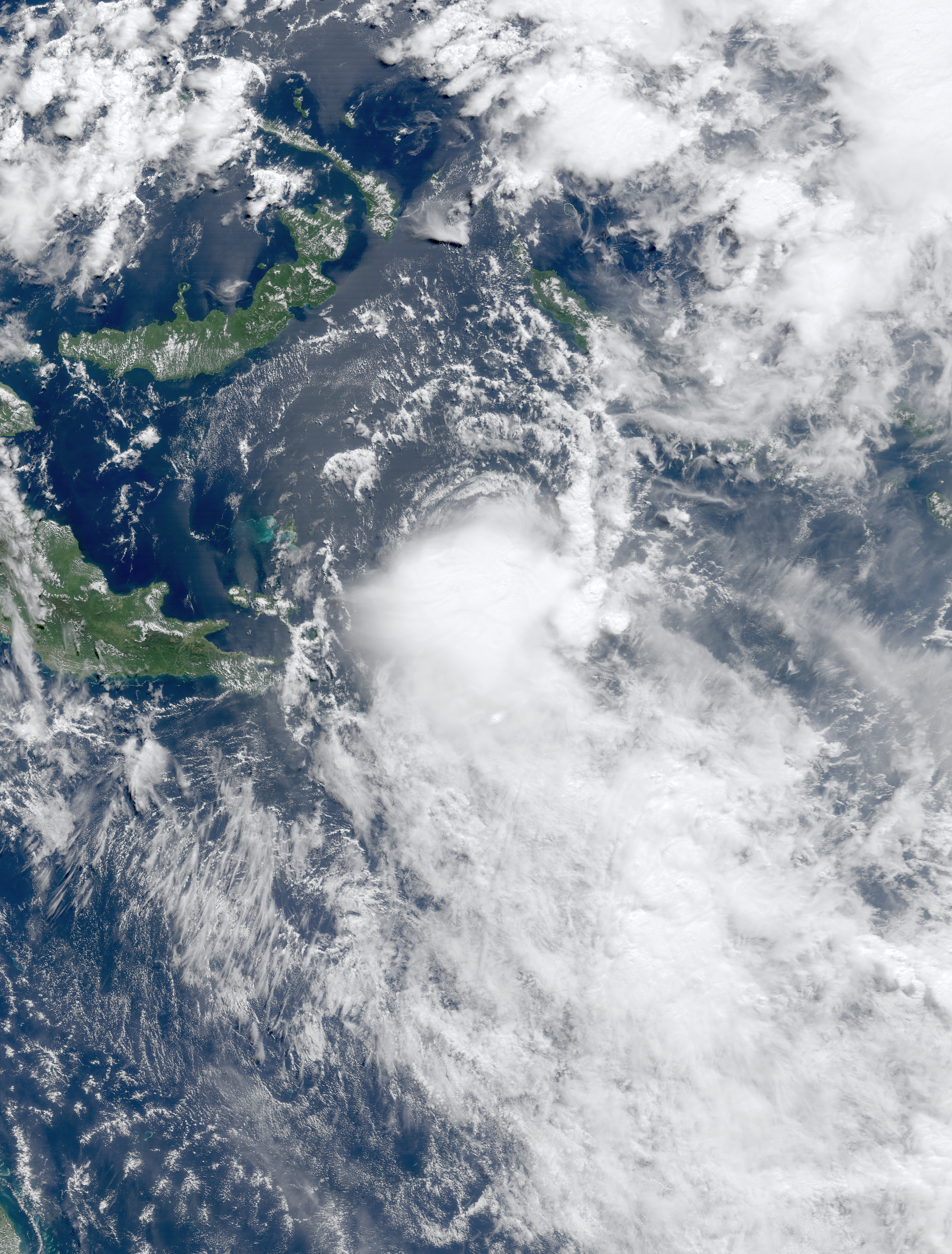
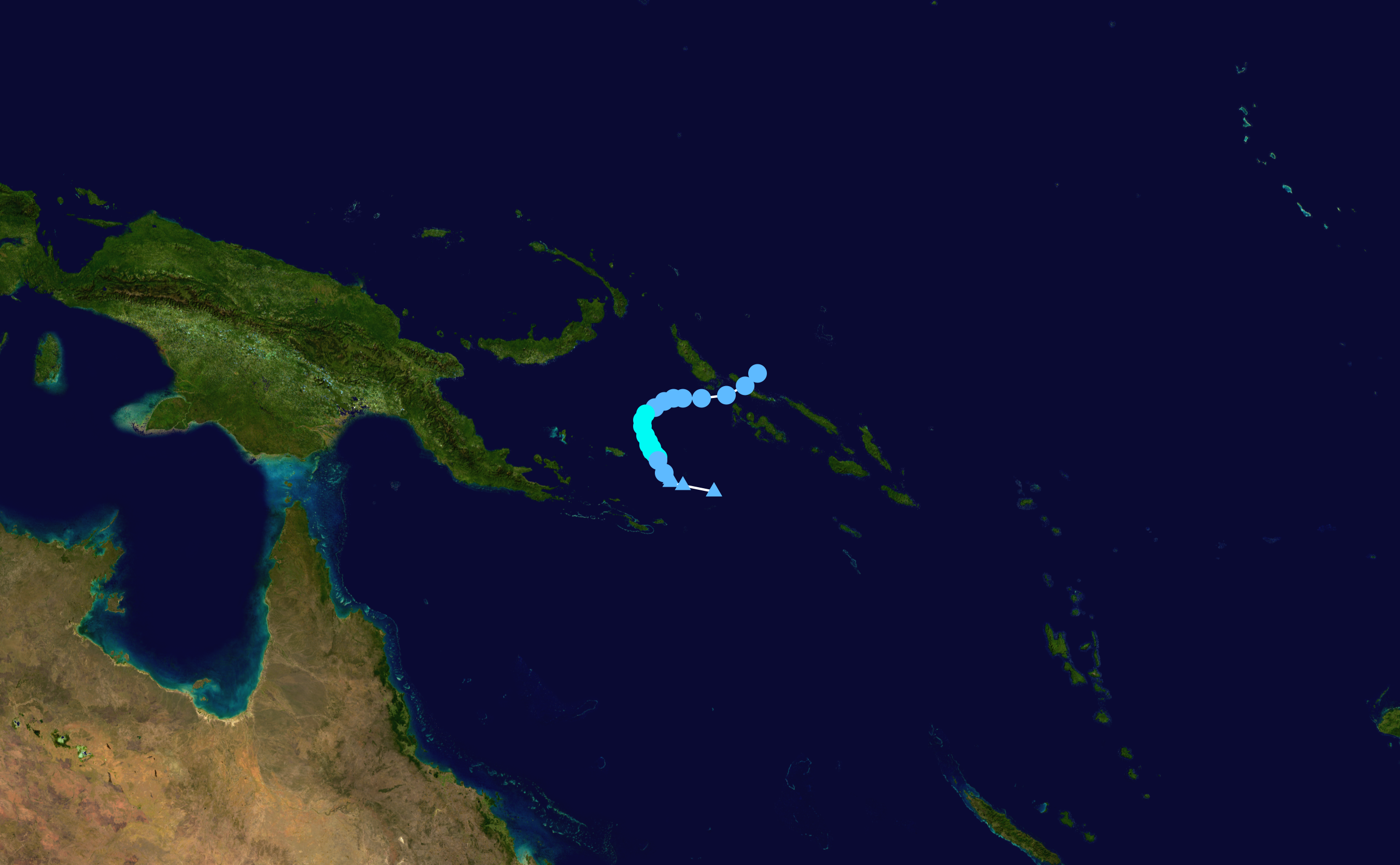
- Duration: 26 May – 29 May
- Peak intensity: 75 km/h (45 mph) (10-min); 990 hPa (mbar)

On 23 May a mass of convection north of Bougainville Island developed a well-defined mid-level circulation and broad low-level circulation. The center remained partially exposed for two more days until JTWC issued a Tropical Cyclone Formation Alert, placing the center about 100 nm south of the island. On 25 May, the storm was upgraded by the unofficial agency to Tropical Cyclone 25P. The waters around Papua New Guinea were part of the limited area of responsibility of TCWC Port Moresby. When the cyclone was located near Eastern Milne Bay Province they named the tropical cyclone Upia. Upia was the first system named by the TCWC at Port Moresby since Tropical Cyclone Adel in May 1993.

That night and into the early hours of the 27th, the storm caused havoc on Budibudi Island. All coconut trees – including those on adjacent islands – were flattened. Food crops on a nearby island used for agriculture were ruined by the surges. Several buildings were destroyed by Upia, although no fatalities were reported. The cyclone remained quasi-stationary for many hours until it began drifting south-southeastward. Port Moresby increased their intensity estimates for the system, reporting peak winds at 65 km/h (40 mph) while JTWC estimated the system was considerably weaker. On 28 May JTWC issued their final warning on the system. Port Moresby issued their last warning that day as well. The system was downgraded to an ex-tropical cyclone by TCWC Brisbane when it drifted toward their region.

=== Other systems ===
A weak disturbance originated just west of TCWC Perth's area of responsibility about 625 nm west-northwest of Cocos Islands on 7 November. Over the next few days, it moved slowly east-southeastward towards Cocos. Perth issued gale warnings on 10 November in anticipation of tropical cyclone development. However, when the system failed to develop, the final warning was issued that day at 2200 UTC. Joint Typhoon Warning Center never issued warnings for the system, but did issue at Tropical Cyclone Formation Alert on 9 November. The Bureau of Meteorology continued mentioning the system in their Tropical Cyclone Outlooks. The system drifted back westward and was last mentioned on 13 November when it was about 500 nm from Cocos Islands.

By 9 February a monsoon low had formed inland about 220 kilometers southwest of Darwin. This system drifted eastward over land, reaching the shoreline on the Gulf of Carpentaria on 13 February. TCWC Darwin anticipated tropical cyclone development for the system, and had issued Tropical Cyclone Advices for this system on 12 February and 13 February. However, development failed to materialize. The monsoon low in conjunction with the active trough over Northern Territory produced floods in several of the area's river systems. Major flooding in the Wickham River tributary caused moderate flooding in the Victoria River. The Waterhouse River began rising on 12 February, forcing 500 people to evacuate. Katherine was threatened, but did not flood when the Katherine River rose to a peak of 17.03 metres on 14 February.

A tropical low formed in the southern Gulf of Carpentaria on 16 February east-northeast of Mornington Island. The low moved westwards and made landfall in the Northern Territory the next day. Tropical Cyclone Warning Centre in Darwin continued to track the monsoon low as it moved slowly westward across the southern portion of the territory. On 21 February, the Tropical Cyclone Warning Centre in Perth began referring to a low in the Kimberley region of Western Australia 640 km (400 mi) southwest of Darwin. It is likely that this low was a continuation of the low that formed in the Gulf of Carpentaria, though TCWC Perth did not explicitly state this. The low remained inland as it continued to move westwards into the eastern Pilbara and finally dissipated on 28 February. Heavy rainfall caused the water level in the Fitzroy River to rise to near-record levels, with daily rainfall totals exceeding 100 mm. Many towns and communities, including Kununurra, were isolated by floodwaters, and several Aboriginal communities were evacuated. Significant stock losses occurred in the area. Bonney Downs in the Pilbara recorded a daily rainfall total of 229 mm on 27 February.

== Storm names ==
TCWC Perth

- Alex
- Bessi
- Chris
- Dianne
- Errol

TCWC Darwin

- Bonnie

TCWC Brisbane

- Bernie
- Claudia
- Des

TCWC Port Moresby

- Upia

== Season effects ==
This is a table of all of the storms that have formed in the 2001–02 Australian region cyclone season. It includes their duration, names, landfall(s)–denoted by bold location names – damages, and death totals. Damage and deaths include totals while the storm was extratropical, a wave, or a low, and all of the damage figures are in 2002 AUD and USD.

Name	Dates	Peak intensity			Areas affected	Damage (USD)	Deaths	Ref(s).
Name	Dates	Category	Wind speed	Pressure	Areas affected	Damage (USD)	Deaths	Ref(s).
Alex	26 – 31 October	Category 2 tropical cyclone	95 km/h (60 mph)	984 hPa (29.1 inHg)	None	None	None	
Low	7 – 13 November	Tropical Low	55 km/h (34 mph)	998 hPa (29.5 inHg)	None	None	None	
03S	17 – 22 November	Tropical Low	Not Specified	Not Specified	Indonesia, Queensland	None	None	
Bessi – Bako	26 November – 5 December	Category 2 tropical cyclone	100 km/h (65 mph)	980 hPa (28.94 inHg)	None	None	None	
Bernie	30 December – 6 January	Category 2 tropical cyclone	95 km/h (60 mph)	980 hPa (28.94 inHg)	Northern Territory	Unknown	Unknown	
Chris	2 – 6 February	Category 5 severe tropical cyclone	205 km/h (125 mph)	915 hPa (27.02 inHg)	Western Australia	$929,000	None	
Low	9 – 13 February	Tropical low	55 km/h (34 mph)	998 hPa (29.5 inHg)	Northern Territory	None	None	
Low	16 – 28 February	Tropical Low	Not specified	Not specified	Western Australia, Northern Territory	None	None	
Claudia	11 – 15 February	Category 3 severe tropical cyclone	130 km/h (81 mph)	965 hPa (28.5 inHg)	None	None	None	
Des	3 – 7 March	Category 2 tropical cyclone	95 km/h (60 mph)	985 hPa (29.09 inHg)	Eastern Australia, New Caledonia	Unknown	Unknown	
Dianne	7 – 11 March	Category 3 severe tropical cyclone	150 km/h (93 mph)	955 hPa (28.2 inHg)	None	None	None	
Bonnie	9 – 14 April	Category 2 tropical cyclone	95 km/h (60 mph)	985 hPa (29.09 inHg)	Timor, Indonesia	None	19	
Errol	8 – 14 May	Category 1 tropical cyclone	75 km/h (45 mph)	995 hPa (29.38 inHg)	None	None	None	
Upia	26 – 29 May	Category 1 tropical cyclone	75 km/h (45 mph)	990 hPa (29 inHg)	Budibudi Island, Papua New Guinea	None	None	
Season aggregates
14 systems	26 October – 29 May		205 km/h (127 mph)	915 hPa (27.02 inHg)		$929,000		

== See also ==
- List of Southern Hemisphere tropical cyclone seasons
- List of off-season Australian region tropical cyclones
- Tropical cyclones in 2001, 2002
- Atlantic hurricane seasons: 2001, 2002
- Pacific hurricane seasons: 2001, 2002
- Pacific typhoon seasons: 2001, 2002
- North Indian Ocean cyclone seasons: 2001, 2002
