= 135th meridian east =

Line of longitude

135th meridian east (interactive map)

The meridian 135° east of Greenwich is a line of longitude that extends from the North Pole across the Arctic Ocean, Asia, the Pacific Ocean, Australasia, the Indian Ocean, the Southern Ocean, and Antarctica to the South Pole.

The 135th meridian east forms a great ellipse with the 45th meridian west, meaning it is a quarter away from the 180th meridian and 3 quarters from the 0th meridian.

== From Pole to Pole ==
Starting at the North Pole and heading south to the South Pole, the 135th meridian east passes through:

Co-ordinates	Country, territory or sea	Notes
90°0′N 135°0′E	Arctic Ocean	Geographical North Pole
76°40′N 135°0′E	Laptev Sea	
71°30′N 135°0′E	Russia	Sakha Republic; Khabarovsk Krai — from 59°6′N 135°0′E; Jewish Autonomous Oblast — from 48°42′N 135°0′E, passing just west of Khabarovsk (at 48°25′N 135°7′E); Khabarovsk Krai — from 48°21′N 135°0′E; Primorsky Krai — from 47°11′N 135°0′E
43°27′N 135°0′E	Sea of Japan	
35°41′N 135°0′E	Japan	Island of Honshū — Kyoto Prefecture — Hyōgo Prefecture — from 35°32′N 135°0′E, passing through Akashi — Kyoto Prefecture — from 35°23′N 135°0′E — Hyōgo Prefecture — from 35°17′N 135°0′E; Awaji Island — from 34°36′N 135°0′E — Hyōgo Prefecture
34°33′N 135°0′E	Osaka Bay	
34°17′N 135°0′E	Japan	Wakayama Prefecture — Tomogashima, passing just west of Tomogashima Lighthouse
34°17′N 135°0′E	Pacific Ocean	Passing just east of the island of Noemfoor, Indonesia (at 1°2′S 134°59′E); Passing just west of the island of Mios Num, Indonesia (at 1°30′S 135°6′E)
3°19′S 135°0′E	Indonesia	Island of New Guinea
4°20′S 135°0′E	Arafura Sea	Passing just east of the Aru Islands, Indonesia (at 6°19′S 134°54′E)
12°13′S 135°0′E	Australia	Northern Territory; South Australia — from 26°0′S 134°59′E
33°44′S 135°0′E	Indian Ocean	Australian authorities consider this to be part of the Southern Ocean
60°0′S 135°0′E	Southern Ocean	
65°21′S 135°0′E	Antarctica	Australian Antarctic Territory, claimed by Australia

== See also ==
- 134th meridian east
- 136th meridian east
