= 136th meridian east =

Line of longitude

136th meridian east (interactive map)

The meridian 136° east of Greenwich is a line of longitude that extends from the North Pole across the Arctic Ocean, Asia, the Pacific Ocean, Australasia, the Indian Ocean, the Southern Ocean, and Antarctica to the South Pole.

The 136th meridian east forms a great ellipse with the 44th meridian west.

== From Pole to Pole ==
Starting at the North Pole and heading south to the South Pole, the 136th meridian east passes through:

Co-ordinates	Country, territory or sea	Notes
90°0′N 136°0′E	Arctic Ocean	
76°33′N 136°0′E	Laptev Sea	
75°40′N 136°0′E	Russia	Sakha Republic — Belkovsky Island, New Siberian Islands
75°24′N 136°0′E	Laptev Sea	
74°6′N 136°0′E	Russia	Sakha Republic — Stolbovoy Island, New Siberian Islands
73°59′N 136°0′E	Laptev Sea	
71°37′N 136°0′E	Russia	Sakha Republic; Khabarovsk Krai — from 59°28′N 136°0′E
55°15′N 136°0′E	Sea of Okhotsk	
54°34′N 136°0′E	Russia	Khabarovsk Krai; Primorsky Krai — from 46°53′N 136°0′E
44°26′N 136°0′E	Sea of Japan	
36°1′N 136°0′E	Japan	Island of Honshū — Fukui Prefecture — Shiga Prefecture — from 35°29′N 136°0′E (passing through western Lake Biwa) — Kyoto Prefecture — from 34°51′N 136°0′E — Nara Prefecture — from 34°43′N 136°0′E — Wakayama Prefecture — from 34°0′N 136°0′E — Mie Prefecture — from 33°57′N 136°0′E — Wakayama Prefecture — from 33°44′N 136°0′E
33°42′N 136°0′E	Pacific Ocean	
0°50′S 136°0′E	Indonesia	Island of Biak
1°10′S 136°0′E	Pacific Ocean	
1°39′S 136°0′E	Indonesia	Island of Yapen
1°49′S 136°0′E	Cenderawasih Bay	
2°44′S 136°0′E	Indonesia	Island of New Guinea
4°32′S 136°0′E	Arafura Sea	
11°39′S 136°0′E	Australia	Northern Territory — Drysdale Island and mainland
13°50′S 136°0′E	Gulf of Carpentaria	
15°18′S 136°0′E	Australia	Northern Territory; South Australia — from 26°0′S 136°0′E
34°59′S 136°0′E	Indian Ocean	Australian authorities consider this to be part of the Southern Ocean
60°0′S 136°0′E	Southern Ocean	
66°7′S 136°0′E	Antarctica	Australian Antarctic Territory, claimed by Australia

== See also ==
- 135th meridian east
- 137th meridian east
