= 44th meridian west =

Line of longitude

44th meridian west

The meridian 44° west of Greenwich is a line of longitude that extends from the North Pole across the Arctic Ocean, Greenland, the Atlantic Ocean, South America, the Southern Ocean, and Antarctica to the South Pole.

The 44th meridian west forms a great ellipse with the 136th meridian east.

== From Pole to Pole ==
Starting at the North Pole and heading south to the South Pole, the 44th meridian west passes through:

Co-ordinates	Country, territory or sea	Notes
90°0′N 44°0′W	Arctic Ocean	
83°41′N 44°0′W	Lincoln Sea	
83°14′N 44°0′W	Greenland	Nansen Land
82°50′N 44°0′W	J.P. Koch Fjord	
82°46′N 44°0′W	Greenland	Freuchen Land
82°25′N 44°0′W	Nordenskiöld Fjord	
82°18′N 44°0′W	Greenland	Mainland
60°10′N 44°0′W	Prince Christian Sound	
59°58′N 44°0′W	Greenland	Sammisoq and Egger Island
59°49′N 44°0′W	Atlantic Ocean	
2°38′S 44°0′W	Brazil	Maranhão; Piauí — 6°46′S 44°0′W; Bahia — 10°25′S 44°0′W; Minas Gerais — 14°16′S 44°0′W, passing just west of Belo Horizonte (at 19°55′S 43°56′W); Rio de Janeiro — 22°10′S 44°0′W
22°57′S 44°0′W	Sepetiba Bay	
23°5′S 44°0′W	Brazil	Rio de Janeiro — Restinga da Marambaia (sandbank)
23°6′S 44°0′W	Atlantic Ocean	
60°0′S 44°0′W	Southern Ocean	
78°16′S 44°0′W	Antarctica	Claimed by both Argentina (Argentine Antarctica) and United Kingdom (British Antarctic Territory)

== See also ==
- 43rd meridian west
- 45th meridian west
