= 43rd meridian east =

Line of longitude

43rd meridian east

The meridian 43° east of Greenwich is a line of longitude that extends from the North Pole across the Arctic Ocean, Europe, Asia, Africa, the Indian Ocean, the Southern Ocean, and Antarctica to the South Pole.

The 43rd meridian east forms a great circle with the 137th meridian west.

== From Pole to Pole ==
Starting at the North Pole and heading south to the South Pole, the 43rd meridian east passes through:

Co-ordinates	Country, territory or sea	Notes
90°0′N 43°0′E	Arctic Ocean	
80°32′N 43°0′E	Barents Sea	
68°37′N 43°0′E	White Sea	
66°24′N 43°0′E	Russia	
43°6′N 43°0′E	Georgia	
41°24′N 43°0′E	Turkey	Passing through Lake Van
37°20′N 43°0′E	Iraq	
30°28′N 43°0′E	Saudi Arabia	
16°31′N 43°0′E	Yemen	
14°23′N 43°0′E	Red Sea	
12°53′N 43°0′E	Eritrea	
12°39′N 43°0′E	Djibouti	
11°48′N 43°0′E	Gulf of Tadjoura	
11°35′N 43°0′E	Djibouti	
11°3′N 43°0′E	Somalia	Somaliland
10°6′N 43°0′E	Ethiopia	
4°27′N 43°0′E	Somalia	
0°7′N 43°0′E	Indian Ocean	Passing just west of Grand Comore island, Comoros; Passing just east of Juan de Nova Island, French Southern and Antarctic Lands; Passing just west of the coast of Madagascar
60°0′S 43°0′E	Southern Ocean	
68°4′S 43°0′E	Antarctica	Queen Maud Land, claimed by Norway

== See also ==
- 42nd meridian east
- 44th meridian east
