= 44th meridian east =

Line of longitude

44th meridian east

The meridian 44° east of Greenwich is a line of longitude that extends from the North Pole across the Arctic Ocean, Europe, Asia, Africa, the Indian Ocean, the Southern Ocean, and Antarctica to the South Pole.

The 44th meridian east forms a great circle with the 136th meridian west.

== From Pole to Pole ==
Starting at the North Pole and heading south to the South Pole, the 44th meridian east passes through:

Co-ordinates	Country, territory or sea	Notes
90°0′N 44°0′E	Arctic Ocean	
80°34′N 44°0′E	Barents Sea	
68°33′N 44°0′E	Russia	Kanin Peninsula
68°23′N 44°0′E	White Sea	
67°34′N 44°0′E	Russia	Kanin Peninsula
67°10′N 44°0′E	White Sea	Mezen Bay
66°5′N 44°0′E	Russia	Passing through Nizhny Novgorod
42°35′N 44°0′E	South Ossetia or Georgia	South Ossetia is a partially recognised state. Most nations consider its territory to be part of Georgia.
42°11′N 44°0′E	Georgia	
41°10′N 44°0′E	Armenia	
40°1′N 44°0′E	Turkey	
37°18′N 44°0′E	Iraq	Passing just west of Erbil
29°44′N 44°0′E	Saudi Arabia	
17°22′N 44°0′E	Yemen	
12°36′N 44°0′E	Indian Ocean	Gulf of Aden
10°39′N 44°0′E	Somalia	Somaliland - passing just west of Hargeisa
9°0′N 44°0′E	Ethiopia	
4°57′N 44°0′E	Somalia	
1°5′N 44°0′E	Indian Ocean	Passing between the islands of Mohéli and Anjouan, Comoros
17°21′S 44°0′E	Madagascar	
17°44′S 44°0′E	Indian Ocean	
20°45′S 44°0′E	Madagascar	
24°51′S 44°0′E	Indian Ocean	
60°0′S 44°0′E	Southern Ocean	
68°2′S 44°0′E	Antarctica	Queen Maud Land, claimed by Norway

== See also ==
- 43rd meridian east
- 45th meridian east
