= 45th meridian west =

Line of longitude

45th meridian west

The meridian 45° west of Greenwich is a line of longitude that extends from the North Pole across the Arctic Ocean, Greenland, the Atlantic Ocean, South America, the Southern Ocean, and Antarctica to the South Pole.

In Greenland the meridian defines the borders of Avannaata, Qeqertalik, and Qeqqata municipalities with the Sermersooq municipality and the Northeast Greenland National Park.

The 45th meridian west forms a great ellipse with the 135th meridian east, and it is the reference meridian for the time zone UTC-3.

== From Pole to Pole ==
Starting at the North Pole and heading south to the South Pole, the 45th meridian west passes through:

Co-ordinates	Country, territory or sea	Notes
90°0′N 45°0′W	Arctic Ocean	
83°41′N 45°0′W	Lincoln Sea	
83°8′N 45°0′W	Greenland	Nansen Land
82°51′N 45°0′W	J.P. Koch Fjord	
82°46′N 45°0′W	Greenland	Freuchen Land
82°36′N 45°0′W	Nordenskiöld Fjord	
82°31′N 45°0′W	Greenland	Island of Nares Land
82°3′N 45°0′W	Victoria Fjord	
81°46′N 45°0′W	Greenland	C. H. Ostenfeldt Glacier
60°5′N 45°0′W	Atlantic Ocean	
1°17′S 45°0′W	Brazil	Maranhão — Mirinzal Island
1°24′S 45°0′W	Atlantic Ocean	
1°30′S 45°0′W	Brazil	Maranhão; Piauí — from 7°29′S 45°0′W; Bahia — from 10°54′S 45°0′W; Minas Gerais — from 14°40′S 45°0′W; São Paulo — from 22°27′S 45°0′W
23°24′S 45°0′W	Atlantic Ocean	
60°0′S 45°0′W	Southern Ocean	
60°40′S 45°0′W	South Orkney Islands	Powell Island — claimed by both Argentina (Tierra del Fuego Province) and United Kingdom (British Antarctic Territory)
60°43′S 45°0′W	Southern Ocean	
78°15′S 45°0′W	Antarctica	Claimed by both Argentina (Argentine Antarctica) and United Kingdom (British Antarctic Territory)

== See also ==
- 44th meridian west
- 46th meridian west
