= 43rd meridian west =

Line of longitude

43rd meridian west

The meridian 43° west of Greenwich is a line of longitude that extends from the North Pole across the Arctic Ocean, Greenland, the Atlantic Ocean, South America, the Southern Ocean, and Antarctica to the South Pole.

The 43rd meridian west forms a great circle with the 137th meridian east.

== From Pole to Pole ==
Starting at the North Pole and heading south to the South Pole, the 43rd meridian west passes through:

Co-ordinates	Country, territory or sea	Notes
90°0′N 43°0′W	Arctic Ocean	
83°41′N 43°0′W	Lincoln Sea	
83°17′N 43°0′W	Greenland	Nansen Land; J.P. Koch Fjord — 82°51′N 43°0′W; Freuchen Land — 82°30′N 43°0′W; Paatusoq — 60°47′N 43°0′W
60°32′N 43°0′W	Atlantic Ocean	
2°28′S 43°0′W	Brazil	Maranhão; Piauí — 5°31′S 43°0′W; Maranhão — 6°7′S 43°0′W; Piauí — 6°45′S 43°0′W; Bahia — 9°25′S 43°0′W; Minas Gerais — 14°41′S 43°0′W; Rio de Janeiro (state) — 22°2′S 43°0′W, passing just east of the city of Rio de Janeiro (at 22°54′S 43°11′W)
22°58′S 43°0′W	Atlantic Ocean	
60°0′S 43°0′W	Southern Ocean	
78°7′S 43°0′W	Antarctica	Claimed by both Argentina (Argentine Antarctica) and United Kingdom (British Antarctic Territory)

== See also ==
- 42nd meridian west
- 44th meridian west
