= 138th meridian west =

Line of longitude

138th meridian west

The meridian 138° west of Greenwich is a line of longitude that extends from the North Pole across the Arctic Ocean, North America, the Pacific Ocean, the Southern Ocean, and Antarctica to the South Pole.

The 138th meridian west forms a great circle with the 42nd meridian east.

== From Pole to Pole ==
Starting at the North Pole and heading south to the South Pole, the 138th meridian west passes through:

Co-ordinates	Country, territory or sea	Notes
90°0′N 138°0′W	Arctic Ocean	
74°6′N 138°0′W	Beaufort Sea	
69°7′N 138°0′W	Canada	Yukon; British Columbia — from 60°0′N 138°0′W
59°27′N 138°0′W	United States	Alaska
58°55′N 138°0′W	Pacific Ocean	
60°0′S 138°0′W	Southern Ocean	
75°6′S 138°0′W	Antarctica	Unclaimed territory

== See also ==
- 137th meridian west
- 139th meridian west
