= 136th meridian west =

Line of longitude

136th meridian west (interactive map)

The meridian 136° west of Greenwich is a line of longitude that extends from the North Pole across the Arctic Ocean, North America, the Pacific Ocean, the Southern Ocean, and Antarctica to the South Pole.

The 136th meridian west forms a great circle with the 44th meridian east.

== From Pole to Pole ==
Starting at the North Pole and heading south to the South Pole, the 136th meridian west passes through:

Co-ordinates	Country, territory or sea	Notes
90°0′N 136°0′W	Arctic Ocean	
74°24′N 136°0′W	Beaufort Sea	
69°11′N 136°0′W	Canada	Northwest Territories; Yukon — from 67°0′N 136°0′W; British Columbia — from 60°0′N 136°0′W
59°40′N 136°0′W	United States	Alaska
58°45′N 136°0′W	Glacier Bay	
58°11′N 136°0′W	United States	Alaska — Chichagof Island
57°30′N 136°0′W	Pacific Ocean	Passing just west of Kruzof Island, Alaska, United States (at 57°13′N 135°52′W); Passing just east of Maria Est atoll, French Polynesia (at 22°0′S 136°10′W)
60°0′S 136°0′W	Southern Ocean	
74°39′S 136°0′W	Antarctica	Unclaimed territory

== See also ==
- 135th meridian west
- 137th meridian west
