= 137th meridian west =

Line of longitude

137th meridian west

The meridian 137° west of Greenwich is a line of longitude that extends from the North Pole across the Arctic Ocean, North America, the Pacific Ocean, the Southern Ocean, and Antarctica to the South Pole.

The 137th meridian west forms a great circle with the 43rd meridian east.

== From Pole to Pole ==
Starting at the North Pole and heading south to the South Pole, the 137th meridian west passes through:

Co-ordinates	Country, territory or sea	Notes
90°0′N 137°0′W	Arctic Ocean	
74°15′N 137°0′W	Beaufort Sea	
68°55′N 137°0′W	Canada	Yukon; British Columbia — from 60°0′N 137°0′W
59°5′N 137°0′W	United States	Alaska
58°25′N 137°0′W	Pacific Ocean	
18°18′S 137°0′W	French Polynesia	Pukarua atoll
18°22′S 137°0′W	Pacific Ocean	Passing just west of Tenararo atoll, French Polynesia (at 21°18′S 136°45′W); Passing just east of Morane atoll, French Polynesia (at 23°9′S 137°6′W)
60°0′S 137°0′W	Southern Ocean	
74°43′S 137°0′W	Antarctica	Unclaimed territory

== See also ==
- 136th meridian west
- 138th meridian west
