= 137 BC =

137 BC in various calendars
- Gregorian calendar: 137 BC; CXXXVII BC
- Ab urbe condita: 617
- Ancient Egypt era: XXXIII dynasty, 187
- Pharaoh: Ptolemy VIII Physcon, 9
- Ancient Greek Olympiad (summer): 160th Olympiad, year 4
- Assyrian calendar: 4614
- Balinese saka calendar: N/A
- Bengali calendar: −730 – −729
- Berber calendar: 814
- Buddhist calendar: 408
- Burmese calendar: −774
- Byzantine calendar: 5372–5373
- Chinese calendar: 癸卯年 (Water Rabbit); 2561 or 2354 — to — 甲辰年 (Wood Dragon); 2562 or 2355
- Coptic calendar: −420 – −419
- Discordian calendar: 1030
- Ethiopian calendar: −144 – −143
- Hebrew calendar: 3624–3625
- Hindu calendars
- Vikram Samvat: −80 – −79
- Shaka Samvat: N/A
- Kali Yuga: 2964–2965
- Holocene calendar: 9864
- Iranian calendar: 758 BP – 757 BP
- Islamic calendar: 781 BH – 780 BH
- Javanese calendar: N/A
- Julian calendar: N/A
- Korean calendar: 2197
- Minguo calendar: 2048 before ROC 民前2048年
- Nanakshahi calendar: −1604
- Seleucid era: 175/176 AG
- Thai solar calendar: 406–407
- Tibetan calendar: ཆུ་མོ་ཡོས་ལོ་ (female Water-Hare) −10 or −391 or −1163 — to — ཤིང་ཕོ་འབྲུག་ལོ་ (male Wood-Dragon) −9 or −390 or −1162

Year 137 BC was a year of the pre-Julian Roman calendar. At the time it was known as the Year of the Consulship of Porcina and Mancinus (or, less frequently, year 617 Ab urbe condita) and the Fourth Year of Jianyuan. The denomination 137 BC for this year has been used since the early medieval period, when the Anno Domini calendar era became the prevalent method in Europe for naming years.

== Events ==
=== By place ===
==== Roman Republic ====
- Tiberius Gracchus, quaestor in Spain, observes that slave labor has displaced small freeheld farms.
- Numantine War begins, Quintus Pompeius and M. Popilius Laenas are defeated and disgraced by the Numantians in subsequent years.
- Q. Pompeius is brought to trial by Q.Metellus and others, but acquitted.

== Deaths ==
- Dutugamunu King of Sri Lanka
- Zhao Tuo, Emperor Wu of Nanyue (b. 240 BC)
