= 137th meridian east =

Line of longitude

137th meridian east (interactive map)

The meridian 137° east of Greenwich is a line of longitude that extends from the North Pole across the Arctic Ocean, Asia, the Pacific Ocean, Australasia, the Indian Ocean, the Southern Ocean, and Antarctica to the South Pole.

The 137th meridian east forms a great circle with the 43rd meridian west.

== From Pole to Pole ==
Starting at the North Pole and heading south to the South Pole, the 137th meridian east passes through:

Co-ordinates	Country, territory or sea	Notes
90°0′N 137°0′E	Arctic Ocean	
76°26′N 137°0′E	Laptev Sea	
75°21′N 137°0′E	Russia	Sakha Republic — Kotelny Island, New Siberian Islands
75°14′N 137°0′E	Laptev Sea	
71°28′N 137°0′E	Russia	Sakha Republic; Khabarovsk Krai — from 59°26′N 137°0′E
55°47′N 137°0′E	Sea of Okhotsk	
55°5′N 137°0′E	Russia	Khabarovsk Krai — Feklistova Island
54°54′N 137°0′E	Sea of Okhotsk	
53°50′N 137°0′E	Russia	Khabarovsk Krai — passing through Komsomolsk-on-Amur at 50°34′N 137°0′E; Primorsky Krai — from 47°18′N 137°0′E
45°18′N 137°0′E	Sea of Japan	
37°25′N 137°0′E	Japan	Island of Honshū — Ishikawa Prefecture — Toyama Prefecture — from 36°58′N 137°0′E (passing through Takaoka city) — Gifu Prefecture — from 36°17′N 137°0′E — Aichi Prefecture — from 35°23′N 137°0′E (passing just east of Nagoya city center)
34°49′N 137°0′E	Mikawa Bay	
34°33′N 137°0′E	Pacific Ocean	
1°50′S 137°0′E	Indonesia	Island of Kurudu
1°51′S 137°0′E	Cenderawasih Bay	
2°7′S 137°0′E	Indonesia	Island of New Guinea
4°56′S 137°0′E	Arafura Sea	
12°20′S 137°0′E	Gulf of Carpentaria	Passing just east of Groote Eylandt, Australia (at 14°15′S 136°57′E)
15°35′S 137°0′E	Australia	Northern Territory — Vanderlin Island and the mainland South Australia — from 26°0′S 137°0′E
33°44′S 137°0′E	Spencer Gulf	
34°56′S 137°0′E	Australia	South Australia — Yorke Peninsula, passing just east of Marion Bay (at 35°14′31″S 136°58′41″E)
35°13′S 137°0′E	Investigator Strait	
35°40′S 137°0′E	Australia	South Australia — Kangaroo Island
36°1′S 137°0′E	Indian Ocean	Australian authorities consider this to be part of the Southern Ocean
60°0′S 137°0′E	Southern Ocean	
66°19′S 137°0′E	Antarctica	Adélie Land, claimed by France

== See also ==
- 136th meridian east
- 138th meridian east
