= Citronen Fjord =

Fjord in Peary Land, Greenland

- Map of Northern Ellesmere Island and far Northern Greenland.

- Location in Greenland
- Location: Arctic
- Coordinates: 83°0′N 29°55′W
- River sources: Esrum River
- Ocean/sea sources: Frederick E. Hyde Fjord; Wandel Sea
- Basin countries: Greenland
- Max. length: 4 km (2.5 mi)
- Max. width: 1.5 km (0.93 mi)
- Frozen: All year round
- Settlements: Citronen mine

Citronen Fjord is a fjord in Peary Land, far northern Greenland. Administratively it is part of the Northeast Greenland National Park.

The name of the fjord was given by Danish Arctic explorer Eigil Knuth during the Danish Peary Land Expedition of 1947–1950. It was named after Danish freedom fighter Jørgen Haagen Schmith, whose codename was Citronen.

== History ==
In 1993 zinc and lead deposits were discovered in this fjord. They are considered to be the largest yet unexploited zinc deposits in the world and the exploitation of the Citronen mine is in the preparation phase. Australian Ironbark Zinc corporation and the People's Republic of China are involved in the mine projects of the Citronen Fjord.

== Geography ==
Citronen Fjord is an offshoot on the southern shore of Frederick E. Hyde Fjord. It is located in Hans Egede Land, 45 km (28 mi) from Cape John Flagler, at the fjord entrance. The fjord is roughly oriented in a north–south direction. It is only 4 km (2.5 mi) in length and there is no glacier discharging at the head of the fjord.

== See also ==
- List of fjords of Greenland
