= Freja Fjord =

Fjord in Greenland

- Frejas Fjord
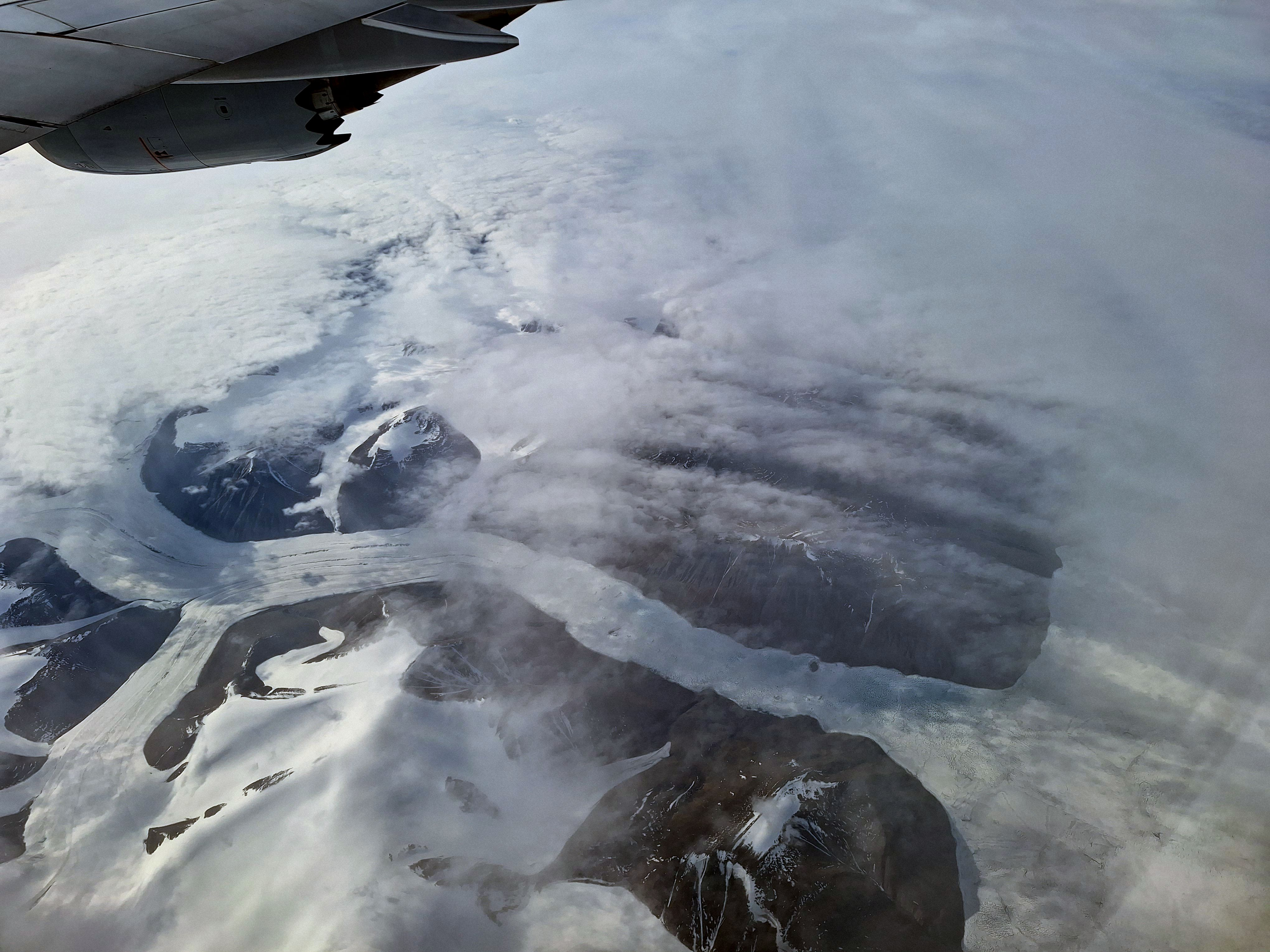
- Aerial photo from July 2026

- Location in Greenland
- Location: Arctic
- Coordinates: 82°59′N 32°07′W
- River sources: Balder Glacier
- Ocean/sea sources: Frederick E. Hyde Fjord; Wandel Sea
- Basin countries: Greenland
- Max. length: 9 km (5.6 mi)
- Max. width: 2 km (1.2 mi)
- Frozen: All year round

Freja Fjord (Danish: Frejas Fjord) is a fjord in Peary Land, far northern Greenland.

The fjord is mentioned in a letter from geologist Peter Dawes to Eigil Knuth regarding a possible archaeological discovery.

== Geography ==
Map of Northern Ellesmere Island and far Northern Greenland

Freja Fjord is an offshoot on the southern shore of Frederick E. Hyde Fjord, located 65 km (40 mi) to the west of Cape John Flagler at the fjord entrance, and 30 km (19 mi) to the east of Thor Fjord. Larger Frigg Fjord has its mouth in the facing side. The fjord is roughly oriented in a north–south direction and is roughly 9 km (5.6 mi) in length.

Flowing from the Nordkrone, the small Balder Glacier discharges at the head of Freja Fjord. Mount Wistar, the highest mountain in the area, rises to the southwest of the western shore of the fjord.

== See also ==
- List of fjords of Greenland
