= Odin Fjord =

Fjord in Peary Land, Greenland

- Odins Fjord
- Map of Northern Ellesmere Island and far Northern Greenland

- Location in Greenland
- Location: Arctic
- Coordinates: 82°53′N 35°36′W
- River sources: Ymer Glacier
- Ocean/sea sources: Frederick E. Hyde Fjord; Wandel Sea
- Basin countries: Greenland
- Max. length: 20 km (12 mi)
- Max. width: 2.5 km (1.6 mi)
- Frozen: All year round

Odin Fjord (Danish: Odins Fjord) is a fjord in Peary Land, far northern Greenland.

Robert Peary did not explore the Frederick E. Hyde Fjord owing to thick fog at its mouth. The inner fjord branches were mapped and named by Lauge Koch in the course of aerial surveys from the 1920s onwards.

== Geography ==
Odin Fjord is an offshoot on the southern shore of Frederick E. Hyde Fjord, located close to its head, 121 km (75 mi) west of Cape John Flagler at the fjord entrance. Thor Fjord has its mouth to the east on the same side. The fjord is roughly oriented in a north–south direction and is nearly 20 km (12 mi) in length.

Flowing northwards to the east of the Hans Tausen Ice Cap, the Ymer Glacier discharges at the head of the fjord. To the east of Odin Fjord lies the Heimdal Ice Cap.

== See also ==
- List of fjords of Greenland
