= Thor Fjord =

Fjord in Peary Land, Greenland

- Thors Fjord
- Map of Northern Ellesmere Island and far Northern Greenland

- Location in Greenland
- Location: Arctic
- Coordinates: 82°55′N 34°16′W
- Ocean/sea sources: Frederick E. Hyde Fjord; Wandel Sea
- Basin countries: Greenland
- Max. length: 10 km (6.2 mi)
- Max. width: 2 km (1.2 mi)
- Frozen: All year round

Thor Fjord (Danish: Thors Fjord) is a fjord in Peary Land, far northern Greenland.

Robert Peary did not explore the Frederick E. Hyde Fjord owing to thick fog at its mouth. The inner fjord branches were mapped and named by Lauge Koch in the course of aerial surveys from the 1920s onwards.

== Geography ==
Thor Fjord is an offshoot on the southern shore of Frederick E. Hyde Fjord 95 km (59 mi) west of Cape John Flagler at the fjord entrance. It is located between Freja Fjord to the east and Odin Fjord to the west on the same side. The fjord is roughly oriented in a north–south direction and is nearly 20 km (12 mi) in length.

1,737-metre-high (5,699 ft) Mount Wistar, the highest point of the area, rises to the east of the inner section. To the west lies the Heimdal Ice Cap. There is no glacier at the head of Thor Fjord.

== See also ==
- List of fjords of Greenland
