= Wistar =

Wistar may refer to:

- Caspar Wistar (1696–1752), Pennsylvania glassmaker and landowner.
- Caspar Wistar (1761–1818), physician and anatomist, grandson of the glassmaker.
- Isaac J. Wistar (1827-1905), Union general and penologist.
- Wistar Institute, a biomedical research center in Philadelphia, Pennsylvania, named after the physician.
  - Wistar rat, a strain of albino laboratory rats developed at the institute.
- Mount Wistar, a mountain in Greenland

== See also ==
- Wister (disambiguation)
