= Cape Henry Parish =

Headland in Greenland

- Cape
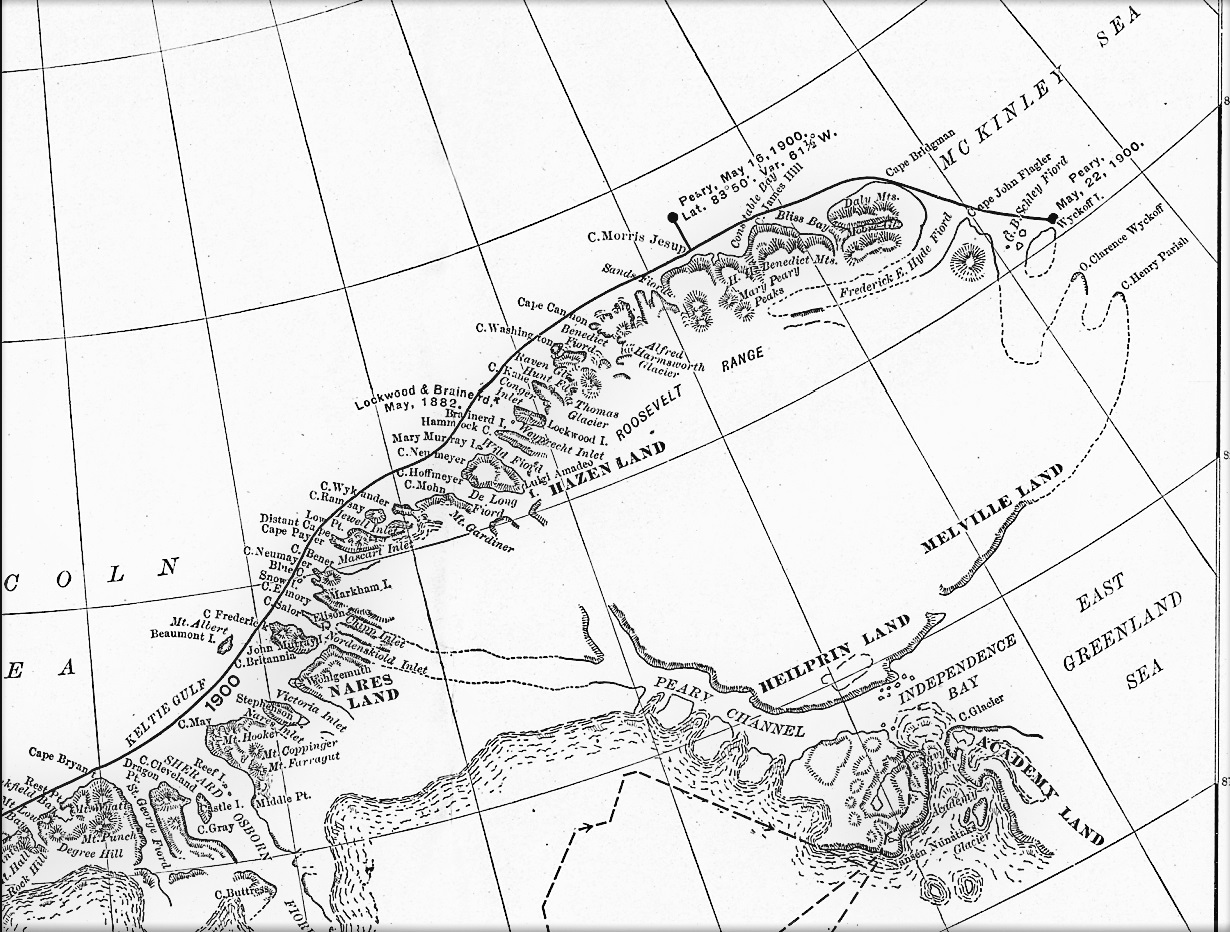
- Peary's 1900 explorations map showing Cape Henry Parish in an uncertain position.

- Coordinates: 82°40′N 23°0′W
- Location: Peary Land, Greenland
- Offshore water bodies: Wandel Sea, Arctic Ocean

Cape Henry Parish (Danish: Kap Henry Parish) is a broad headland in the Wandel Sea, Arctic Ocean, northernmost Greenland. Administratively it is part of the Northeast Greenland National Park.

== History ==
In 1900 Peary explored the north coast of Greenland from Cape Washington in the west to a place he named Wyckoff Island in the east, on the way reaching Cape Morris Jesup, the northernmost point of mainland Greenland. Cape Henry Parish was visible in the distance and was named by Robert Peary after banker Henry Parish (1829-1917), President of the New York Life Insurance & Trust Co., and one of the founding members of the Peary Arctic Club in New York.

This headland was marked on Robert Peary's map of the eastern coast of North Greenland as guesswork, based on sighting of two headlands from Wyckoff Land, for the visibility was marred by fog. Cape Henry Parish was finally charted with accuracy by J.P. Koch during the 1906-07 Danmark Expedition.

== Geography ==
Cape Henry Parish is located at the northern end of Herlufsholm Strand, in the eastern shore of Peary Land, 32 kilometres (104,987 ft) to the NW of Cape Eiler Rasmussen, Peary Land's easternmost point. It lies off the NE side of the mouth of Hellefisk Fjord, and 13 kilometres (42,651 ft) to the SE of Cape Clarence Wyckoff. Mount Wyckoff, reaching a height of 850 metres (2,789 ft), rises above the shore of the headland.
