= Wyckoff =

Wyckoff may refer to:

== People ==
- Albert Capwell Wyckoff (1903–1953), American Presbyterian minister and mystery writer
- Alvin Wyckoff (1877–1957), American cinematographer
- Brooke Wyckoff (born 1980), American basketball player and coach
- Charles Wyckoff (1916–1998), American photochemist
- Charlotte C. Wyckoff (1893–1966), American missionary teacher, writer, based in India
- Clint Wyckoff (1874–1947), American collegiate football player
- Delaphine Grace Wyckoff (1906–2001), American microbiologist and educator
- Edward Wyckoff Williams (born 1978), American journalist
- James Wyckoff (active 2015), American education economist
- Michael Wyckoff (born 1994), American film composer
- Pieter Claesen Wyckoff (ca. 1620–1694), prominent figure in early Dutch-American history
- Ralph Walter Graystone Wyckoff (1897–1994), American crystallographer
- Richard Wyckoff (1873–1934), American investor
- Russell Wyckoff (1925–2004), American politician from Iowa
- Weldon Wyckoff (1893–1961), American baseball pitcher

== Places ==
- Wyckoff, New Jersey
- Wyckoff–Garretson House, in Somerset, New Jersey
- Wyckoff House, in Brooklyn, New York
- Wyckoff-Snediker Family Cemetery, in Queens, New York
- Wyckoff Land, Greenland
- Cape Wyckoff, Greenland
- Mount Wyckoff, Greenland

== Other uses ==
- Wyckoff positions, in crystallography

== See also ==
- Wykoff, Minnesota
