= G.B. Schley Fjord =

Fjord in Greenland

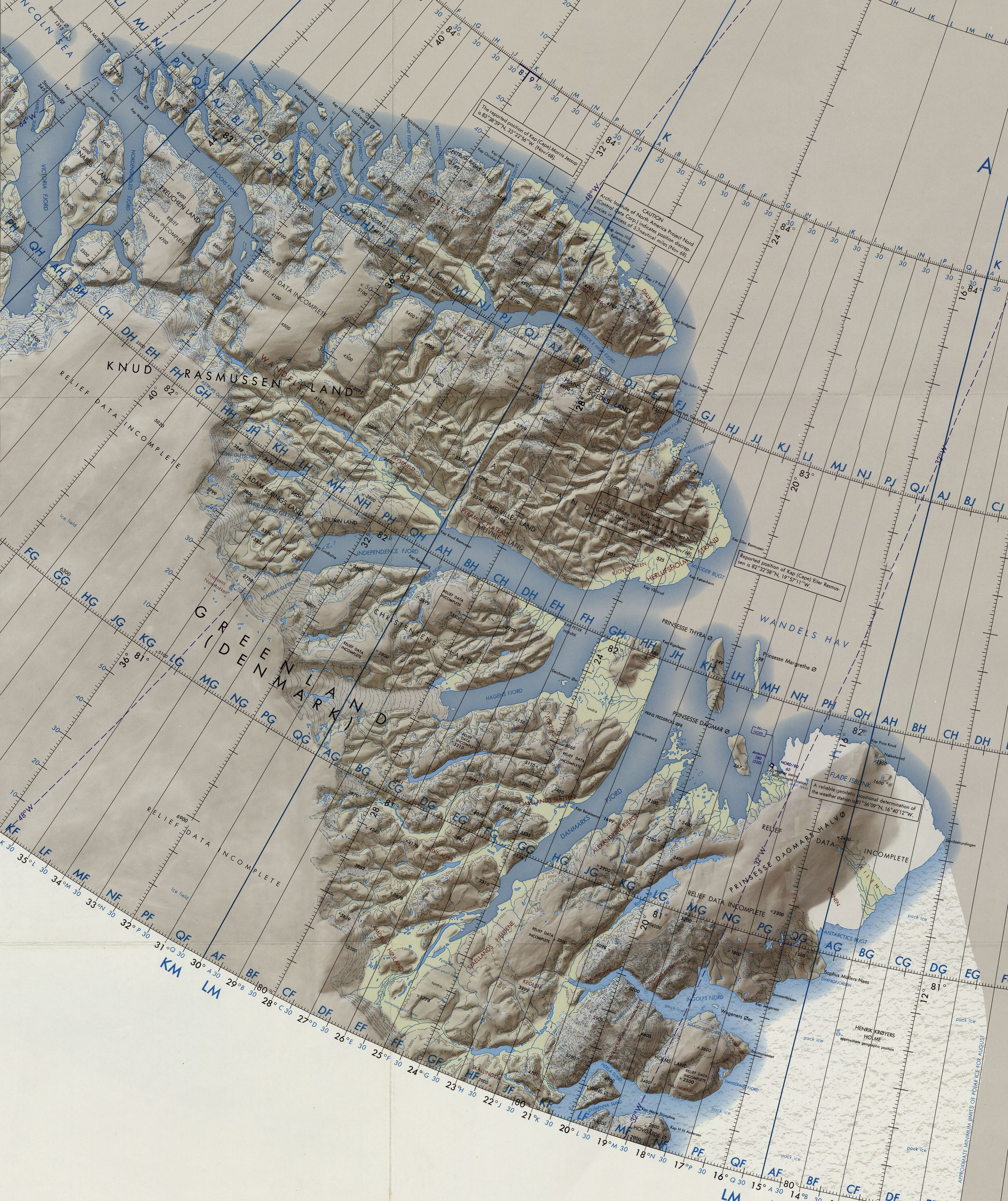
- Map of Northeastern Greenland

- Location in Greenland
- Location: Arctic
- Coordinates: 82°51′N 25°0′W
- River sources: Spøttrup Elv
- Ocean/sea sources: Wandel Sea
- Basin countries: Greenland
- Max. length: 30 km (19 mi)
- Max. width: 1.5 km (0.93 mi)
- Settlements: none

G.B. Schley Fjord is a fjord in Peary Land, northern Greenland. To the east, the fjord opens into the Wandel Sea of the Arctic Ocean.

The fjord was named by Robert Peary after G.B. Schley, one of the founding members of the Peary Arctic Club in New York.

== Geography ==
The fjord opens to the northeast to the west of Wyckoff Land between Cape Isak Glückstadt to the NW and Cape Clarence Wyckoff to the east. It marks the northern limit of Herluf Trolle Land. Hans Egede Land extends to the west of the western shore of the fjord. The mouth is located to the southeast of the mouth of Frederick E. Hyde Fjord and northwest of Hellefisk Fjord.

The Spøttrup Elv river discharges its waters at the head of the fjord. Ormen is a fjord branch on the middle stretch of the western shore of G.B. Schley Fjord.

== See also ==
- List of fjords of Greenland
- Peary Land
