= Herluf Trolle Land =

Area in Peary Land, Greenland

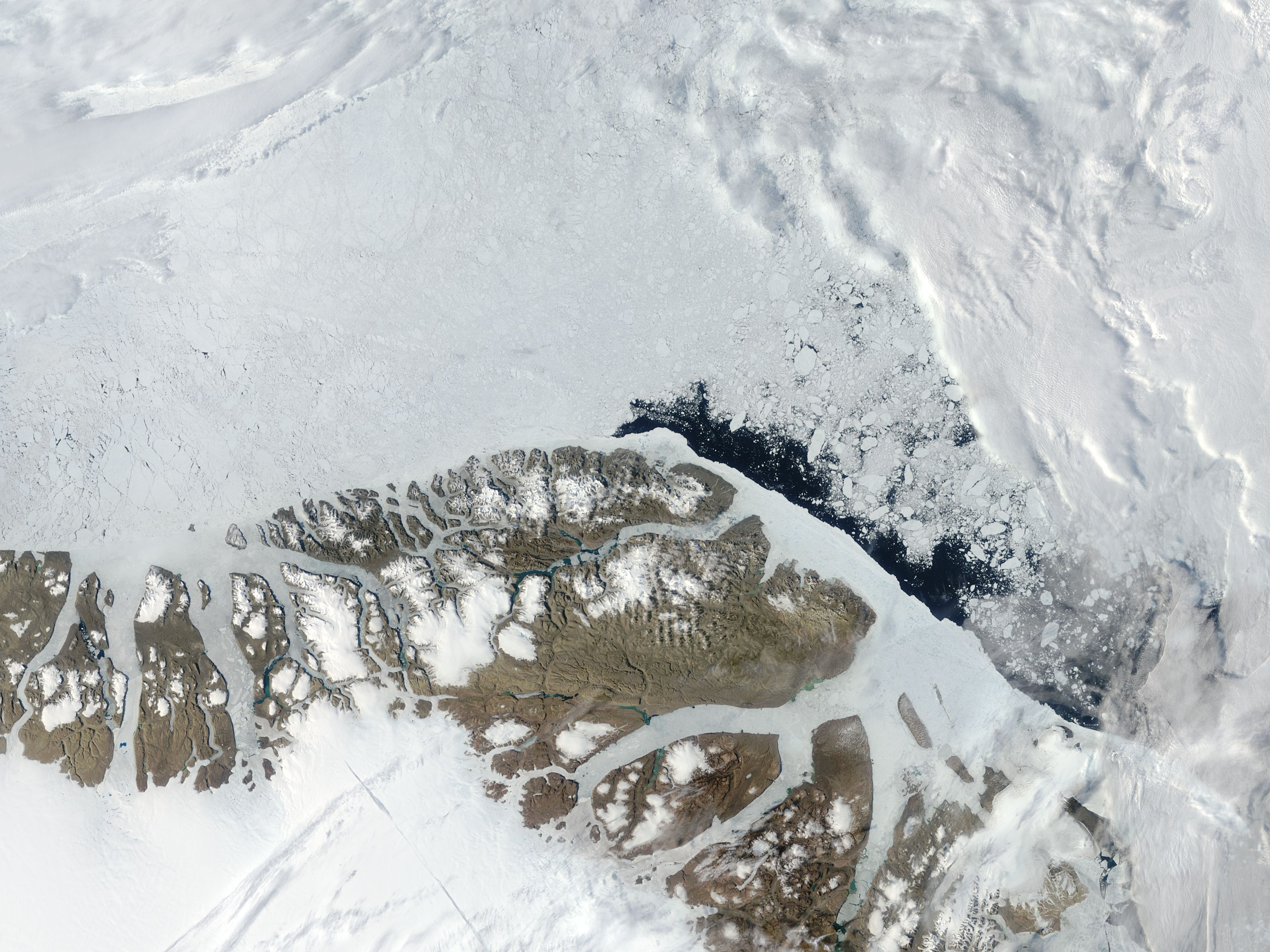
- NASA image of far Northern Greenland.

- Location within Greenland

Geography
- Location: Peary Land, Greenland
- Coordinates: 82°30′N 23°00′W
- Adjacent to: Independence Fjord; Wandel Sea; G.B. Schley Fjord
- Length: 60 km (37 mi)
- Width: 50 km (31 mi)
- Highest elevation: 914 m (2999 ft)
- Highest point: Unnamed

Administration
- Greenland (Denmark)

Demographics
- Population: Uninhabited

Herluf Trolle Land is an area in Peary Land, North Greenland. Administratively it is part of the Northeast Greenland National Park.

The area has two clearly defined parts: Herlufsholm Strand, the flat southeasterly point of Peary Land, and the easternmost mountainous hinterland of the peninsula which rises to the north of Independence Fjord.

== History ==
There are ancient archaeological remains in the area, including the frame of a 10.6 metres (35 ft) long umiak and a number of camping grounds with abandoned utensils, that were found at excavations in Herlufsholm Strand. This coastal zone may be the first place of the eastward spreading of the early Arctic Whale Hunting Culture from Alaska.

In 1900 Robert Peary discerned Cape Clarence Wyckoff, a broad headland on the northeastern shore of Herluf Trolle Land, from Wyckoff Island, a place by the shore which Peary mistook for an island. It was the farthest point that he reached after rounding the northern end of Greenland.

The coast south of this cape was explored by J.P. Koch in the course of the 1906-08 Danmark Expedition and was named after historical Danish mariner Herluf Trolle (1516 – 1565). Later it would be mapped accurately by Lauge Koch by means of surveys that he undertook during the Danish Bicentenary Jubilee Expedition in 1920-23 and the cartographic air expedition of 1938.

== Geography ==
Herluf Trolle Land is located in southeastern Peary Land, on the northern side of the mouth area of the Independence Fjord. The limits of the territory are not clearly defined. To the west it is bounded by Melville Land, and to the north by the G.B. Schley Fjord.

Herluf Trolle Land is the mountainous sector located to the west of Herlufsholm Strand. There are several low mountain ranges in the northeastern portion of the territory and two small ice caps. In the north a mountainous plateau rises to a height of 914 metres (2,999 ft) and 853 metres (2,799 ft) high Mount Clarence Wyckoff rises near Hellefisk Fjord. Except for these heights the area is largely ice-free. The plains bordering the mountain zone are crossed by numerous rivers.

=== Herlufsholm Strand ===
The coastal zone is known as Herlufsholm Strand, a broad, low-lying strip of land between the Wandel Sea shore to the east and the mountains of the interior to the west. It extends between Cape Eigil Knuth (Kap København) and Cape Henry Parish, with Cape Eiler Rasmussen as the easternmost point. Mudder Bay (Mudderbugten), a 9.2 kilometres (30,184 ft) wide, open bay, is located near the southern limit by Cape Eigil Knuth. The sea facing the Herlufsholm Strand shore is frozen throughout the entire year. Mount Henry Parish rises near the northern end and Kjovesletten is a coastal flatland that lies to the southwest. There are muskoxen in the area.

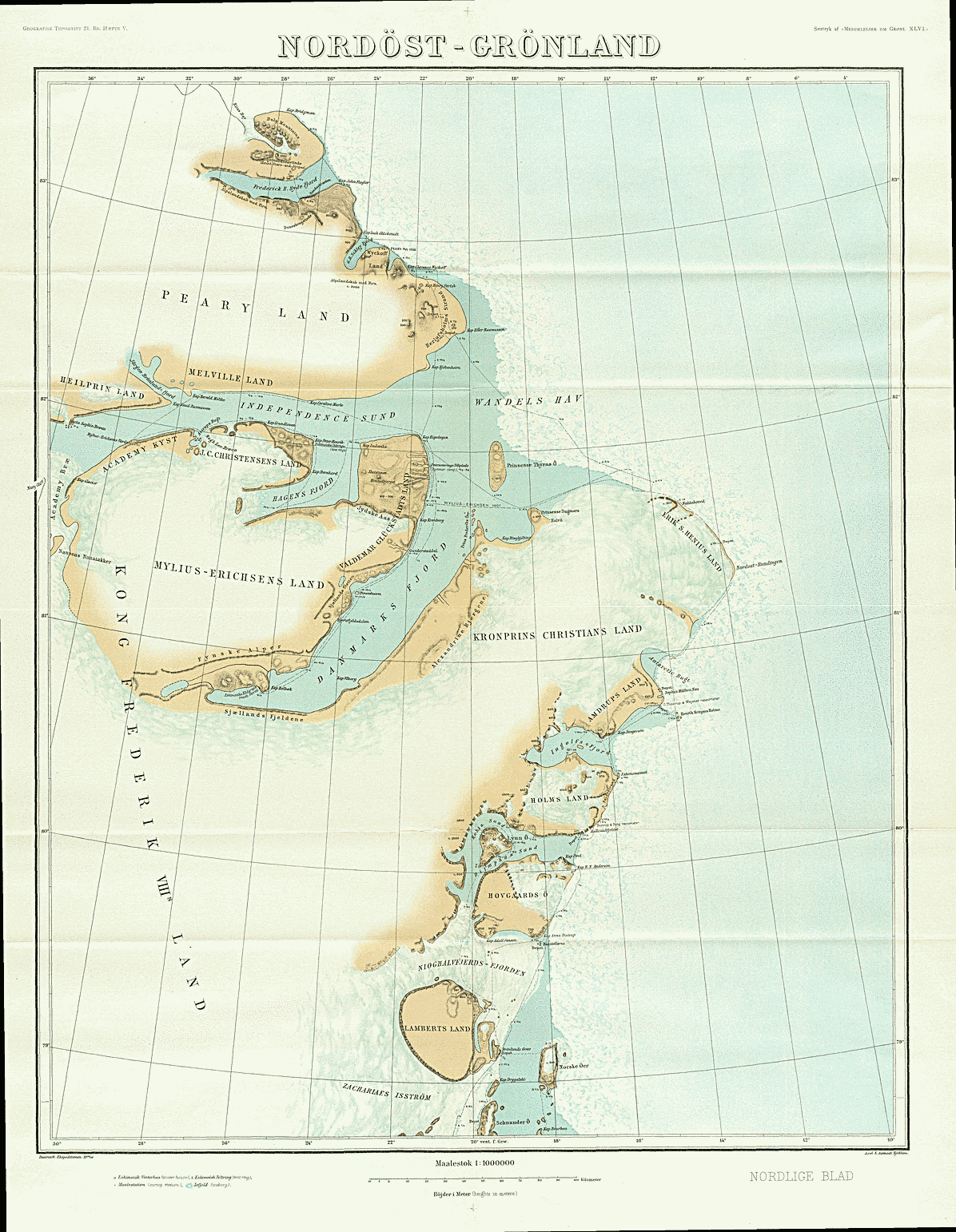
Johan Peter Koch map of NE Greenland showing the location of Herlufsholm Strand.

== Bibliography ==
- H.P. Trettin (ed.), Geology of the Innuitian Orogen and Arctic Platform of Canada and Greenland. 1991
- B. Fristrup, Winderosion within the Arctic Deserts. 1953
- Bjarne Grønnow, Jens Fog Jensen: The Northernmost Ruins of the Globe. Eigil Knuth’s Archaeological Investigations in Peary Land and Adjacent Areas of High Arctic Greenland (= Man & Society. Vol. 29). Museum Tusculanums Forlag, Københavns Universitet, Copenhagen 2003, ISBN 978-87-635-3065-1, 978-8763512626

== See also ==
- Cartographic expeditions to Greenland
- Innuitian orogeny
