= Wycoff =

Wycoff may refer to:

== People ==
- Leon Ames (1902–1993), born Harry L. Wycoff, American film and television actor
- Corrina Wycoff (fl. 2007–2016), American writer
- Doug Wycoff (1903–1981), American football player
- Michael Wycoff (born 1956), American R&B singer

== Places ==
- Wykoff, Minnesota, a city in Minnesota, U.S.

== See also ==
- Wyckoff (disambiguation)
- Wyckoff School District
