= Ironbark (disambiguation) =

Ironbark is a common name of a number of species in three taxonomic groups within the genus Eucalyptus

Ironbark may also refer to:

== Places ==
- Ironbark, Queensland, a rural locality in the City of Ipswich, Australia
- Ironbark, Victoria
- Stuart Town, New South Wales, formerly called Ironbark

== Other ==
- Ironbark, an album by The Waifs
- Ironbark Zinc, an Australian mining company
- Ironbark, the festival title of the 2020 American-British film The Courier
- The Man from Ironbark, a poem by Banjo Paterson
