= Ormen (Greenland) =

Fjord in Northern Greenland

- ONC map of Northern Ellesmere Island and far Northern Greenland.

- Location in Greenland
- Location: Arctic
- Coordinates: 82°53′N 25°22′W
- River sources: unnamed
- Ocean/sea sources: G.B. Schley Fjord; Wandel Sea
- Basin countries: Greenland
- Max. length: 9 km (5.6 mi)
- Max. width: 1.3 km (0.81 mi)

Ormen is a fjord in Peary Land, northern Greenland. Administratively, the fjord belongs to the Northeast Greenland National Park.

== Geography ==
The fjord is located in the eastern part of Hans Egede Land. It opens to the northeast in the middle stretch of the northwestern shore of G.B. Schley Fjord.

An unnamed river discharges its waters at the head of the fjord. The area is uninhabited.

== See also ==
- List of fjords of Greenland
- Peary Land
