= Flagler =

Flagler may refer to:

== Places ==
- Flagler, Colorado
- Flagler County, Florida, named for Henry Morrison Flagler
- Flagler Beach, Florida
- Cape John Flagler, Greenland

== People with the surname ==
- Adam Flagler (born 1999), American basketball player
- Henry Morrison Flagler, American businessman responsible for development of much of the Florida East Coast.
- Terrence Flagler, American football player
- Thomas T. Flagler, American politician

== Other uses ==
- Whitehall (Henry M. Flagler House), currently houses the Henry Morrison Flagler Museum
- Flagler College, a private college in Florida named for Henry Morrison Flagler, located on part of his estate
- Flagler train or Dixie Flagler
