= Bliss Bay =

Bay in Northeast Greenland National Park, Greenland

- Bliss Bugt
- Map of Northern Ellesmere Island and far Northern Greenland.

- Location in Greenland
- Location: Peary Land, Arctic
- Coordinates: 83°33′N 29°0′W
- Ocean/sea sources: Wandel Sea
- Basin countries: Greenland
- Max. length: 20 km (12 mi)
- Max. width: 10 km (6.2 mi)
- Frozen: All year round
- Settlements: 0

Bliss Bay (Danish: Bliss Bugt) is a bay in the Wandel Sea, Northern Greenland. The area of the bay is uninhabited. Administratively Bliss Bay and its surroundings belong to the Northeast Greenland National Park.

Bliss Bay is clogged by fast ice year round. Formerly there was an automatic weather station in the bay.

The bay was named by Robert Peary after E. W. Bliss, one of the founding members of the Peary Arctic Club in New York.

== Geography ==
Bliss Bay lies in the northeastern shore of Johannes V. Jensen Land, NE Peary Land, about 20 kilometres (12 mi) WNW of Cape Bridgman and 35 kilometres (22 mi) east of Constable Bay. It is a fairly large bay, located between Cape James Hill to the west and Cape J.P. Koch in the east. A river, Lokes Elv, discharges into the head of the bay.

Kaffeklubben Island lies to the NW off the mouth of Bliss Bay. There are also numerous skerries and small islands along the shore of the bay, as well as inside of it. The Moore Glacier, discharging from the easternmost subranges of the Roosevelt Range, has its terminus in the SE shore of the bay.
