= Grant B. Schley =

American financier and clubman

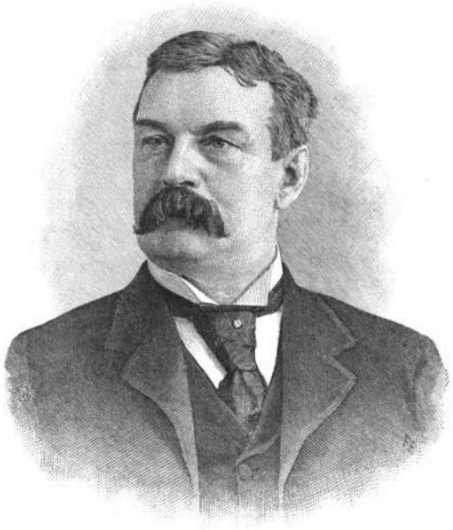
- Born: Grant Barney Schley; February 25, 1845; Chapinsville, Ontario County, New York, US
- Died: November 22, 1917 (aged 72); Far Hills, New Jersey, US
- Burial place: Kensico Cemetery
- Education: Canandaigua Academy
- Occupation: Businessman
- Spouse: Martha Elizabeth Baker (m. 1879)

Signature
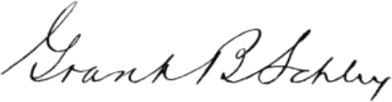

Grant Barney Schley (February 25, 1845 – November 22, 1917) was an American financier and clubman who was a founder of Moore & Schley.

== Early life ==
Schley was born on February 25, 1845, in Chapinsville in Ontario County, New York. He was a son of Evander Schley (1807–1898) and Olive (née Higby) Schley (1809–1888). Among his siblings were older brothers Evander Higby Schley (an agent of the American Express Co. in Geneva) and William T. Schley (a prominent lawyer who was great-grandfather of New Jersey Governor Christine Todd Whitman).

He attended the Canandaigua Academy, before becoming a clerk in the express office of Wells, Butterfield & Co. at Syracuse at the age of sixteen in 1861. Five years later, when the Adams Express Company was formed by the consolidation of various companies, Schley went to New York City to run the money order department of the firm.

== Career ==
In 1874, Schley became clerk in the First National Bank. After six years with First National, he resigned as head of the foreign exchange department to form a brokerage business under the firm name of Groesbeck & Schley with Ernest Groesbeck. In 1885, John Godfrey Moore of the Mutual Telegraph Company entered the brokerage business and Schley became one of his partners in a firm known as Moore and Schley. For many years, he was active on the floor of the New York Stock Exchange, counting among his clientele many of the most prominent men in the country, including Henry Huttleston Rogers, William C. Whitney, William Rockefeller, Oliver Hazard Payne, and John Warne Gates.

Schley served as a director of the American Smelting and Refining Co., the Chihuahua Mining Co., the Coal Creek Mining & Manufacturing Co., the Electric Storage Battery Co., the Elliott-Fisher Co., the Northern Pacific Railway, the Pittsburgh Coal Company, and the Republic Iron and Steel Company.

== Personal life ==
In 1879 Schley was married to Martha Elizabeth Baker (1842–1910), a daughter of New York Assemblyman George Ellis Baker and the former Eveline Stevens. Martha's brother was financier George Fisher Baker, who was known as the "Dean of American Banking" and served as president of First National Bank of New York. Together, they had a townhouse at 845 Fifth Avenue (across the street from the Mrs. William B. Astor House) and a country estate in Far Hills, New Jersey, were the parents of:

- Chaloner Baker Schley (1878–1917), who married Edith Maria Turner (1875–1928).
- Grant Barney Schley Jr. (1881–1936), who married Jane Seney Plummer in 1902. They divorced in 1922, the same year he married Jeanne Marie de Croix (1898–1969) in France.
- Kenneth Baker Schley (1881–1944), who married Ellen Habersham Rogers (1889–1965), a daughter of Col. Archibald Rogers, in 1912.
- Evander "Van" Baker Schley (1883–1952), who married Sophie Beverly Duer, a granddaughter of U.S. Representative William Duer, in 1931.
- Evelyn Baker Schley (1885–1919), who married Max Howell Behr (1884–1955), brother to Karl Behr, in 1906.

He was a member of the Union League Club, Metropolitan Club, New York Yacht Club, Jekyll Island Club, Automobile Club of America, Peary Arctic Club, the France-America Society, Essex Fox Hounds, Somerset Hills Country Club. Schley was also a member of the Agricultural Association, the Academy of Political Science, the Economic Club, and the Archeological Society.

Schley died on November 22, 1917, at his home in Far Hills, New Jersey. He left a gross estate worth $9,210,146 which was reduced to $5,894,715 after payments of debts and expenses.

=== Descendants ===
Through his son Chaloner, he was a grandfather of Grant Barney Schley (1907–1943), who was one of four airmen killed in the crash of the bomber at Yakohl Valley, and Chaloner Baker Schley (1911–1936).

Through his son Grant, he was a grandfather of Grant Barney Schley (c. 1923–1959), and Jeanne Marie Schley (1925–1969), who married Thomas Jackson Oakley Rhinelander (grandson of T. J. Oakley Rhinelander) in 1947.

Through his son Kenneth, he was a grandfather of Anne Caroline (née Schley) Stradling (1913–1992) and aviator Kenneth Baker Schley Jr. (1917–2001).

== See also ==
- G. B. Schley Fjord
