= Cape James Hill =

Headland in northeast Greenland

Cape James Hill Kap James Hill
- Cape
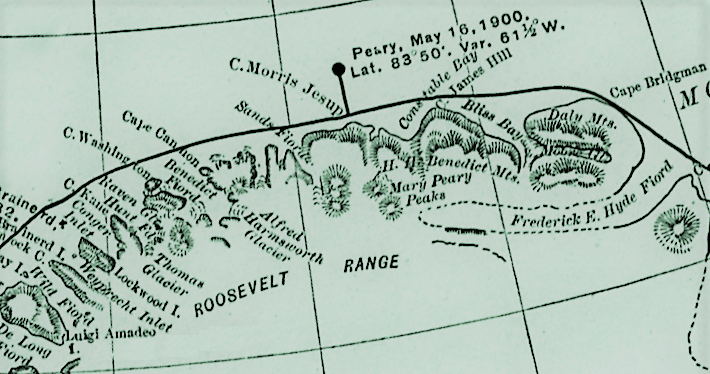
- 1903 Robert Peary map section showing his 1900 explorations in far Northern Greenland.

- Coordinates: 83°36′N 30°25′W
- Location: Northeast Greenland National Park, Greenland
- Offshore water bodies: Wandel Sea, Arctic Ocean

Area
  - Total: Arctic

Cape James Hill (Danish: Kap James Hill) is a headland in the Wandel Sea, Arctic Ocean, northeast Greenland.

The cape was named by Robert Peary after James J. Hill, one of the members of the Peary Arctic Club in New York.

== Geography ==
Cape James Hill is located east of Cape Morris Jesup, Peary Land, between Constable Bay to the west and Bliss Bay to the east. It is the nearest land to Kaffeklubben Island (Oodaap Qeqertaa) located about 9 km (5.6 mi) to the northeast. Administratively it is part of the Northeast Greenland National Park.

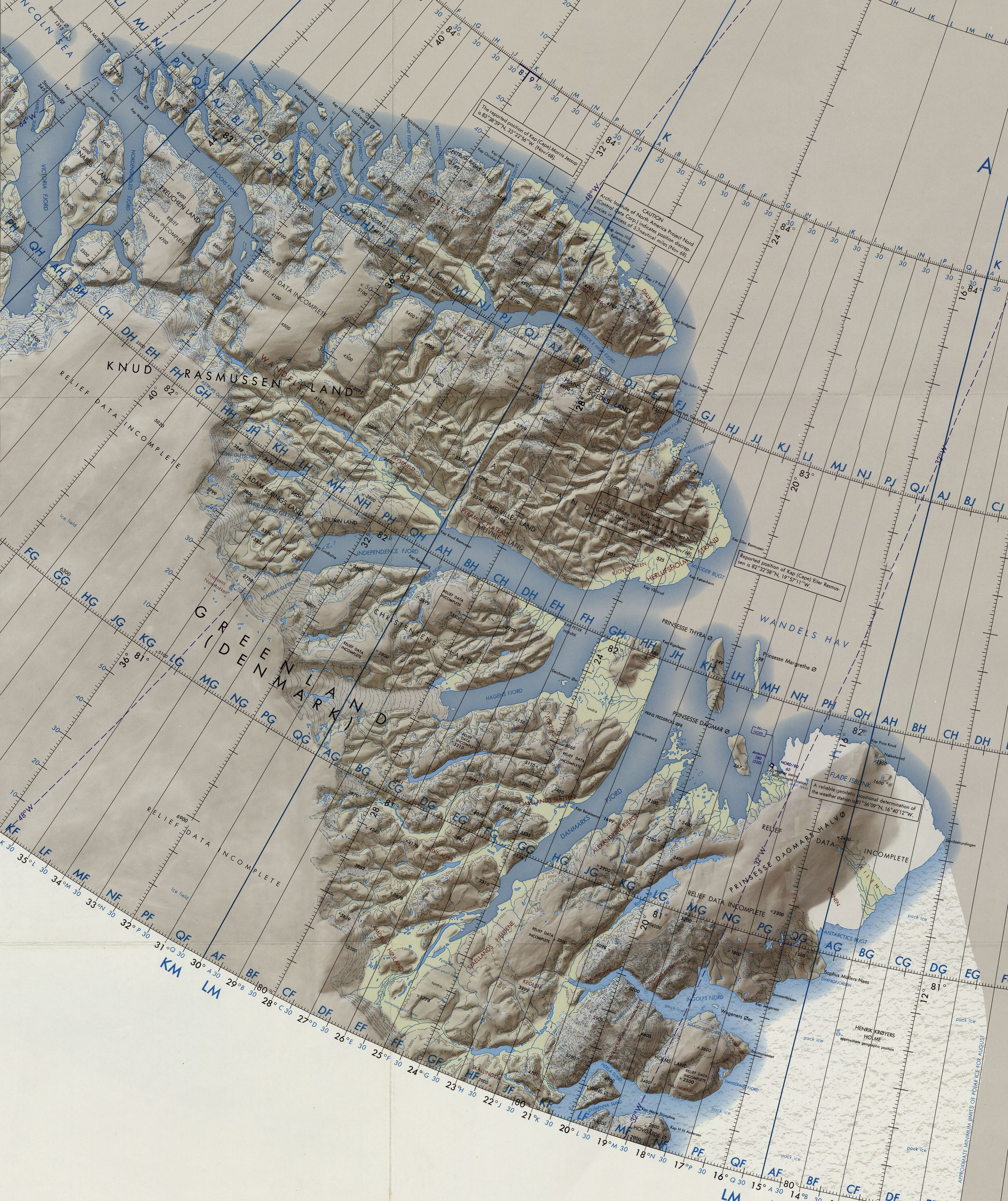
Map of Greenland section.
