= Constable Bay =

Bay in Northeast Greenland National Park, Greenland

- Constable Bugt
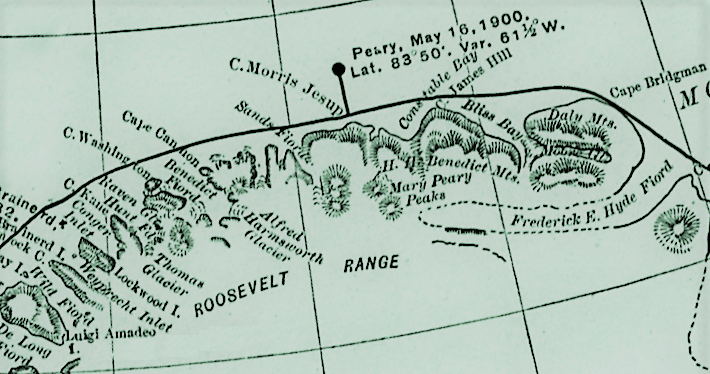
- Section of map published by Robert Peary in 1903 showing his 1900 explorations in far Northern Greenland.

- Location in Greenland
- Location: Peary Land, Arctic
- Coordinates: 83°36′N 32°33′W
- Ocean/sea sources: Wandel Sea
- Basin countries: Greenland
- Max. length: 5 km (3.1 mi)
- Max. width: 20 km (12 mi)
- Frozen: All year round
- Settlements: 0

Constable Bay (Danish: Constable Bugt) is a bay in the Wandel Sea, Northern Greenland. Administratively Constable Bay and its surroundings belong to the Northeast Greenland National Park.

Constable Bay is the northernmost bay in the world. The area of the bay is uninhabited.

== History ==
The bay was named in 1900 by Robert Peary after James M. Constable, a prominent member of the Peary Arctic Club in New York.

== Geography ==
Constable Bay lies in the northernmost shore of Peary Land, in Johannes V. Jensen Land, about 35 km (22 mi) west of Bliss Bay and about 5 kilometres (3.1 mi) east of Cape Morris Jesup. It is a fairly large indentation, with Cape James Hill rising at its eastern end. The bay is clogged by fast ice the year round.

The northern arm of the Sif Glacier, discharging from the Roosevelt Range to the south, ends in a valley with its mouth in Constable Bay, having formed prominent terminal moraines.

Map of Northern Ellesmere Island and far Northern Greenland.

== See also ==
- List of northernmost items
