= Cape Eiler Rasmussen =

Headland of Greenland

Cape Eiler Rasmussen Kap Eiler Rasmussen
- Cape
- Map of Northern Ellesmere Island and far Northern Greenland.

- Location within Greenland
- Coordinates: 82°36′N 21°20′W
- Location: Peary Land, Greenland
- Water bodies: Wandel Sea, Arctic Ocean

Cape Eiler Rasmussen (Danish: Kap Eiler Rasmussen) is a broad headland in the Wandel Sea, Arctic Ocean, northernmost Greenland. Administratively it is part of the Northeast Greenland National Park.

This cape is Peary Land's easternmost point. It was named after Danish painter Eiler Rasmussen during the Danish Bicentenary Jubilee Expedition of 1920-23.

== Geography ==
Cape Eiler Rasmussen is located at the eastern end of Peary Land in the middle stretch of the shore of Herlufsholm Strand, 32 kilometres (104,987 ft) to the SE of Cape Henry Parish. Mudder Bay lies to the south by Cape Eigil Knuth (Kap København).

There is pack ice off the shore all year round.
