= Steuben, Maine =

Town in Maine, United States

- Town
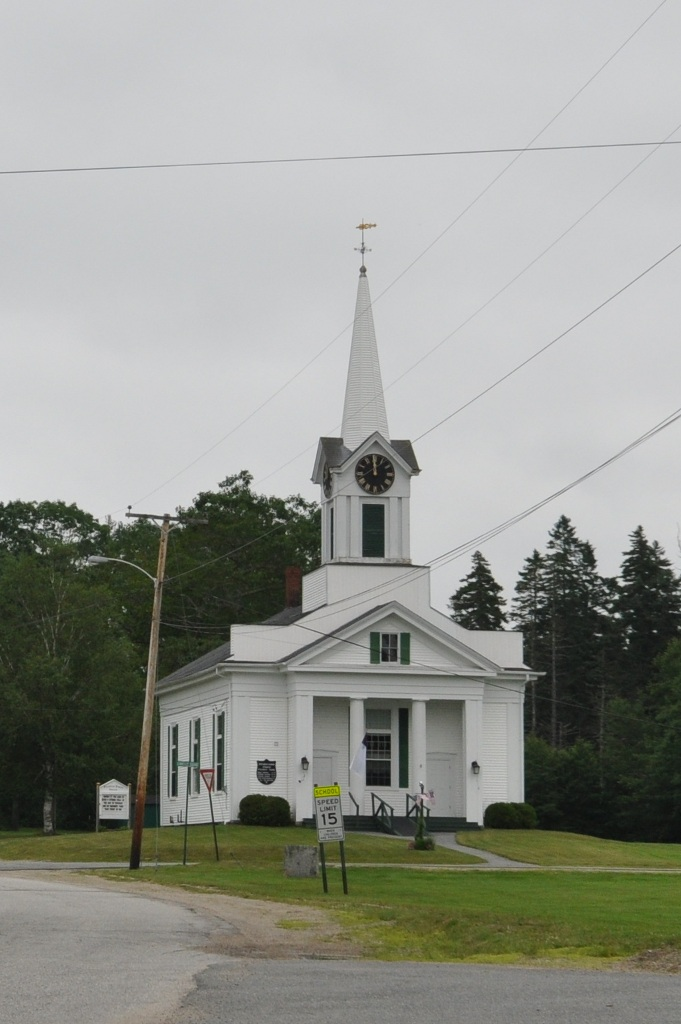
- The Union Church in the town center

- Logo

- Location within Maine Location within the United States
- Coordinates: 44°30′24″N 67°56′19″W
- Country: United States
- State: Maine
- County: Washington

Area
  - Total: 74.8 sq mi (193.7 km^{2})
  - Land: 43.0 sq mi (111.3 km^{2})
  - Water: 31.8 sq mi (82.4 km^{2})
- Elevation: 3 ft (0.91 m)

Population (2020)
  - Total: 1,129
  - Density: 26/sq mi (10.1/km^{2})
- Time zone: UTC-5 (Eastern (EST))
  - Summer (DST): UTC-4 (EDT)
- ZIP code: 04680
- Area code: 207
- FIPS code: 23-74125
- GNIS feature ID: 582747
- Website: townofsteuben.com

Steuben is a town in Washington County, Maine, United States. Incorporated in 1795, it was named after Baron Friedrich Wilhelm von Steuben, the Inspector General of the U.S. Army during the Revolutionary War. The population was 1,129 at the 2020 census.

== Demographics ==
Historical population
Census	Pop.	Note	%±
1800	347		—
1810	552		59.1%
1820	780		41.3%
1830	695		−10.9%
1840	884		27.2%
1850	1,122		26.9%
1860	1,191		6.1%
1870	1,062		−10.8%
1880	1,165		9.7%
1890	982		−15.7%
1900	901		−8.2%
1910	890		−1.2%
1920	714		−19.8%
1930	684		−4.2%
1940	690		0.9%
1950	784		13.6%
1960	673		−14.2%
1970	697		3.6%
1980	970		39.2%
1990	1,084		11.8%
2000	1,126		3.9%
2010	1,131		0.4%
2020	1,129		−0.2%
U.S. Decennial Census

=== 2010 census ===
As of the census of 2010, there were 1,131 people, 474 households, and 306 families living in the town. The population density was 26.3 inhabitants per square mile (10.2/km^{2}). There were 873 housing units at an average density of 20.3 per square mile (7.8/km^{2}). The racial makeup of the town was 95.1% White, 0.5% African American, 1.6% Native American, 0.1% Asian, 1.2% from other races, and 1.4% from two or more races. Hispanic or Latino of any race were 2.3% of the population.

There were 474 households, of which 28.9% had children under the age of 18 living with them, 48.9% were married couples living together, 8.0% had a female householder with no husband present, 7.6% had a male householder with no wife present, and 35.4% were non-families. 28.1% of all households were made up of individuals, and 12.2% had someone living alone who was 65 years of age or older. The average household size was 2.39 and the average family size was 2.84.

The median age in the town was 42.4 years. 21.8% of residents were under the age of 18; 8.9% were between the ages of 18 and 24; 23.3% were from 25 to 44; 30.7% were from 45 to 64; and 15.2% were 65 years of age or older. The gender makeup of the town was 50.8% male and 49.2% female.

=== 2000 census ===
As of the census of 2000, there were 1,126 people, 459 households, and 314 families living in the town. The population density was 26.2 inhabitants per square mile (10.1/km^{2}). There were 775 housing units at an average density of 18.0 per square mile (7.0/km^{2}). The racial makeup of the town was 96.98% White, 0.27% African American, 0.98% Native American, 0.44% Asian, 0.36% from other races, and 0.98% from two or more races. Hispanic or Latino of any race were 0.53% of the population.

There were 459 households, out of which 29.6% had children under the age of 18 living with them, 58.2% were married couples living together, 7.8% had a female householder with no husband present, and 31.4% were non-families. 22.7% of all households were made up of individuals, and 12.0% had someone living alone who was 65 years of age or older. The average household size was 2.45 and the average family size was 2.88.

In the town, the population was spread out, with 24.3% under the age of 18, 7.3% from 18 to 24, 29.8% from 25 to 44, 25.0% from 45 to 64, and 13.7% who were 65 years of age or older. The median age was 38 years. For every 100 females, there were 97.2 males. For every 100 females age 18 and over, there were 95.9 males.

The median income for a household in the town was $25,208, and the median income for a family was $28,400. Males had a median income of $21,806 versus $16,583 for females. The per capita income for the town was $12,162. About 13.9% of families and 19.5% of the population were below the poverty line, including 19.8% of those under age 18 and 17.5% of those age 65 or over.

== Geography ==
According to the United States Census Bureau, the town has a total land area of 62.29.

== Education ==
It is in the Regional School Unit 24. The zoned K-8 school is Ella Lewis School in Steuben. The district's high school, Sumner Memorial High School, is a part of the Sumner Learning Campus in Sullivan.

== Notable people ==
- Martha Gallison Moore Avery, Unitarian socialist turned Catholic activist
- Wilmot Hyde Bradley, geologist who retired in Steuben
- John Godfrey Moore, American businessman
