= Peary Arctic Club =

Club in New York City

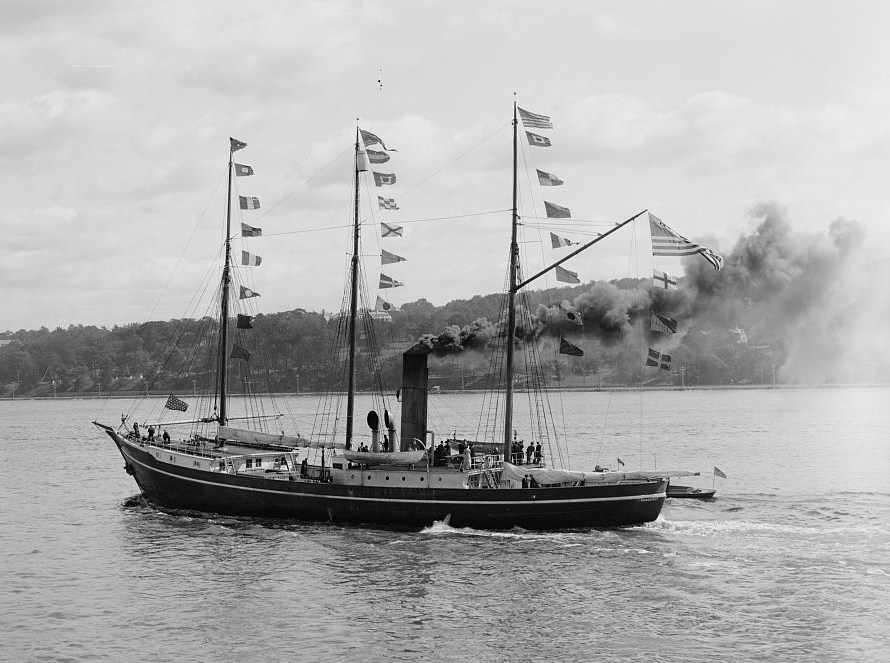
Roosevelt in the Hudson–Fulton parade in 1909

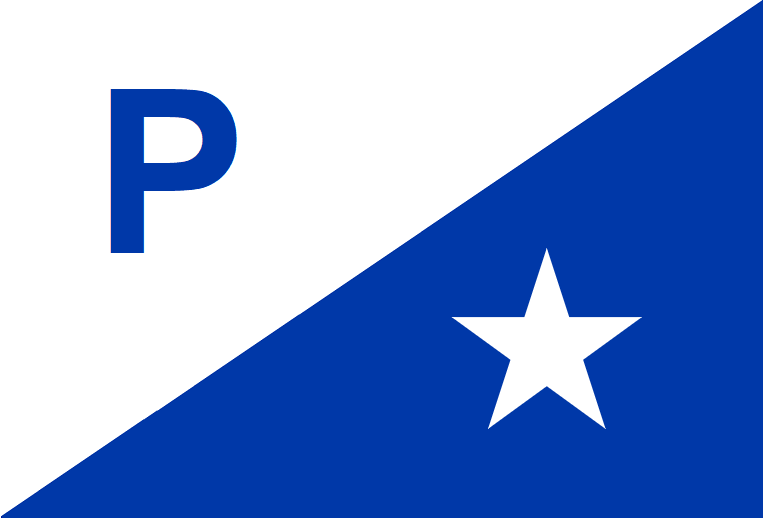
Peary flag flown on SS Roosevelt

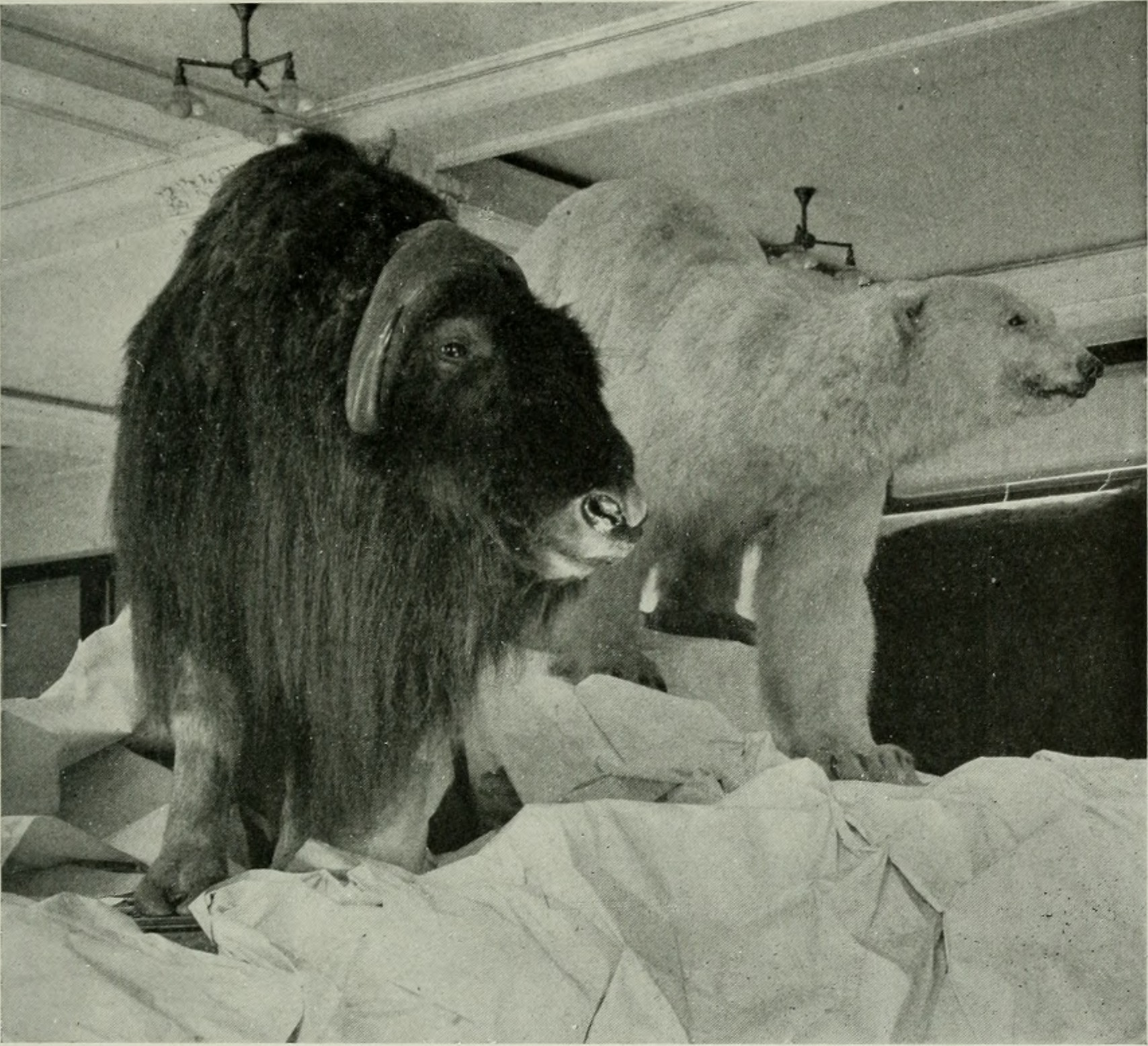
Peary Arctic Club Exhibit ca 1918.

The Peary Arctic Club was an American-based club with the goal of promoting the Arctic expeditions of Robert Peary (1856–1920).

This association of influential persons was able to overcome the opposition of the U.S. Navy Department to grant the indispensable five–year leave for Peary's 1898 Arctic expedition.

== History ==
The Peary Arctic Club was founded in New York City in 1898 by a group of wealthy New York people. Its members were friends of Peary. The idea of establishing the club had been put forward by Morris K. Jesup in the spring 1897. One year after the foundation, Morris Jesup was elected in 1899 as the first president of the club. Henry W. Cannon became treasurer, Herbert Bridgman secretary and Frederick E. Hyde vice-president. Judge Charles P. Daly, president of the American Geographical Society was elected to the executive committee of the club.

In 1904, the club was able to raise funds to buy Peary a ship for his expeditions, the SS Roosevelt. The club's fundraising included generous gifts of $50,000 from George Crocker, the youngest son of banker Charles Crocker, and $25,000 from Morris K. Jesup.

Following Morris Jesup's death in 1908, Thomas Hubbard was named president of the club and Zenas Crane was given the post of vice-president. The club was extinguished after Peary's death in 1920.

== Prominent members ==
- Herbert L. Bridgman
- Henry W. Cannon
- Thomas Hamlin Hubbard
- E. C. Benedict
- E. W. Bliss
- Charles P. Daly
- James J. Hill
- Henry H. Benedict
- Frederick E. Hyde
- John M. Flagler
- H. Hayden Sands
- James M. Constable
- Clarence F. Wyckoff
- Edward G. Wyckoff
- Henry Parish
- A. A. Raven
- Grant B. Schley
- Eben B. Thomas
- James W. Davidson

== Honors ==
A number of geographic features in Greenland and Canada were named after members of the club, including:

- Benedict Fjord
- Bliss Bay
- Cape Bridgman
- Cape Cannon
- Cape Henry Parish
- Cape James Hill
- Cape John Flagler
- Cape Morris Jesup, the northernmost point of Greenland
- Cape Thomas Hubbard
- Cape Wyckoff
- Constable Bay
- Daly Range
- Frederick E. Hyde Fjord
- G. B. Schley Fjord
- H. H. Benedict Range
- Judge Daly Promontory
- Morris Jesup Glacier
- Mount Daly
- Mount Davidson
- Mount Henry Parish
- Mount Schley
- Mount Wyckoff
- Raven Glacier
- Sands Fjord
- Thomas Glacier
- Wyckoff Island
- Wyckoff Land

== Bibliography ==
- Robert E. Peary, Nearest the Pole: A Narrative of the Polar Expedition of the Peary Arctic Club in the S. S. Roosevelt, 1905 -1906.
- Robert E. Peary, The North Pole (Illustrated)
- Peary Arctic Club : objects of the club, plan of campaign, description of new ship. Lotus Press, New York. 1905
- North Polar Exploration: Field Work of the Peary Arctic Club 1898-1902, Scientific American, 1904
