= Wyckoff Land =

Peninsula in Greenland

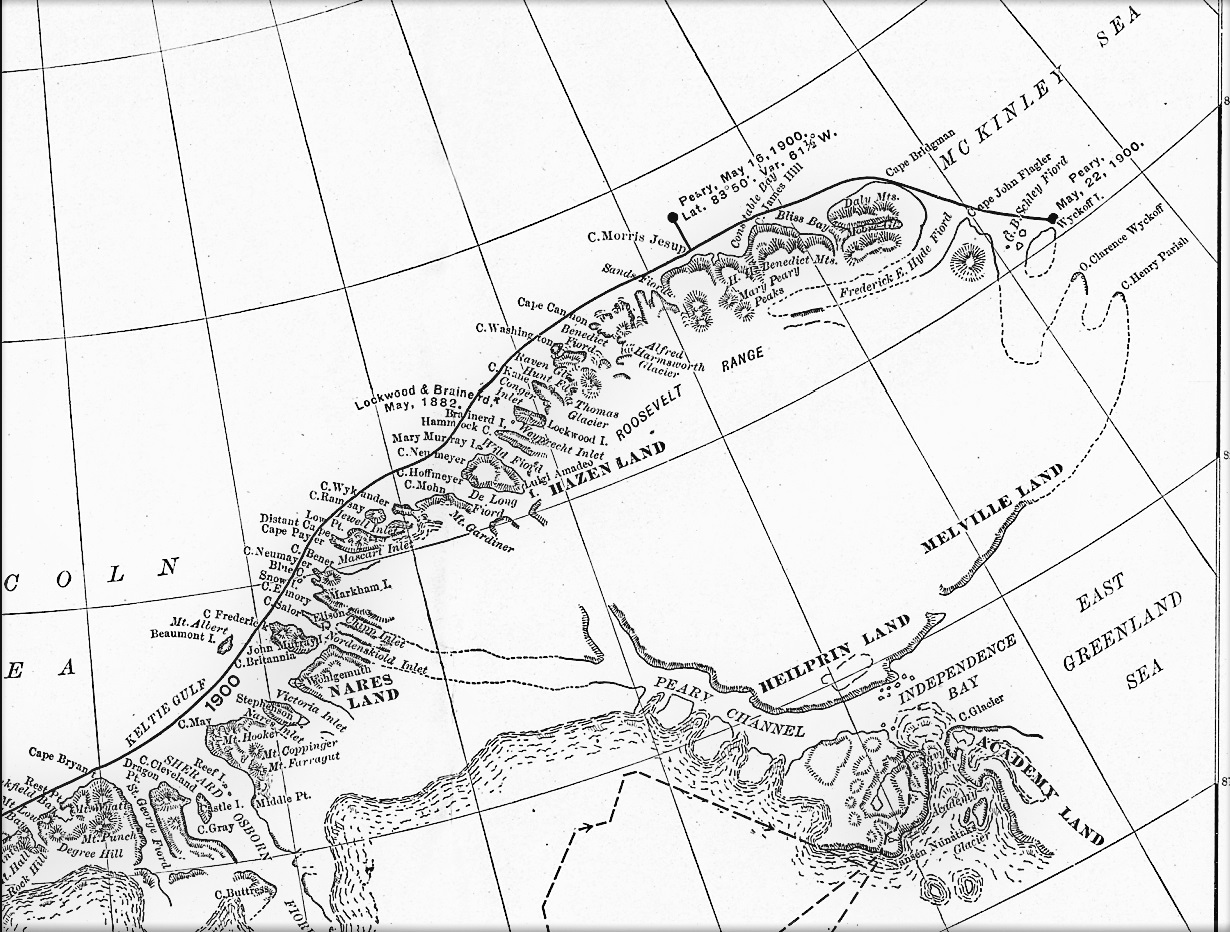
- Peary's 1900 explorations map showing Wyckoff Island

- Location within Greenland

Geography
- Location: Peary Land
- Coordinates: 82°50′N 24°30′W
- Adjacent to: Hellefisk Fjord Wandel Sea; G.B. Schley Fjord

Administration
- Greenland
- Northeast Greenland National Park

Demographics
- Population: 0

Wyckoff Land is an area or peninsula in Peary Land, Northern Greenland.

This geographic feature was named by Robert Peary after Clarence F. Wyckoff, one of the founding members of the Peary Arctic Club in New York.

== History ==
When Robert Peary reached the area the weather was foggy and he assumed that the landform he stood upon was an island which he named "Clarence Wyckoff Island". He waited for two days for the fog to clear and then he returned.

Pearys Vardenæs is a cairn built in 1900 by Peary before he returned towards the west. It stands in the outermost part of Wyckoff Land between Skaerbugt and Hellefisk Fjord. Two Independence I archaeological sites have been discovered on the headland.

== Geography ==
Wyckoff Land lies in northern Herluf Trolle Land, by the northeastern shore of Peary Land, between G.B. Schley Fjord to the west and Hellefisk Fjord to the east.

To the southwest the peninsula is attached to the mainland and to the northeast lies the Wandel Sea of the Arctic Ocean. Cape Clarence Wyckoff is located 9 kilometres (6 mi) to the southeast of the eastern shore and Mount Clarence Wyckoff rises to the east, on the other side of Hellefisk Fjord.

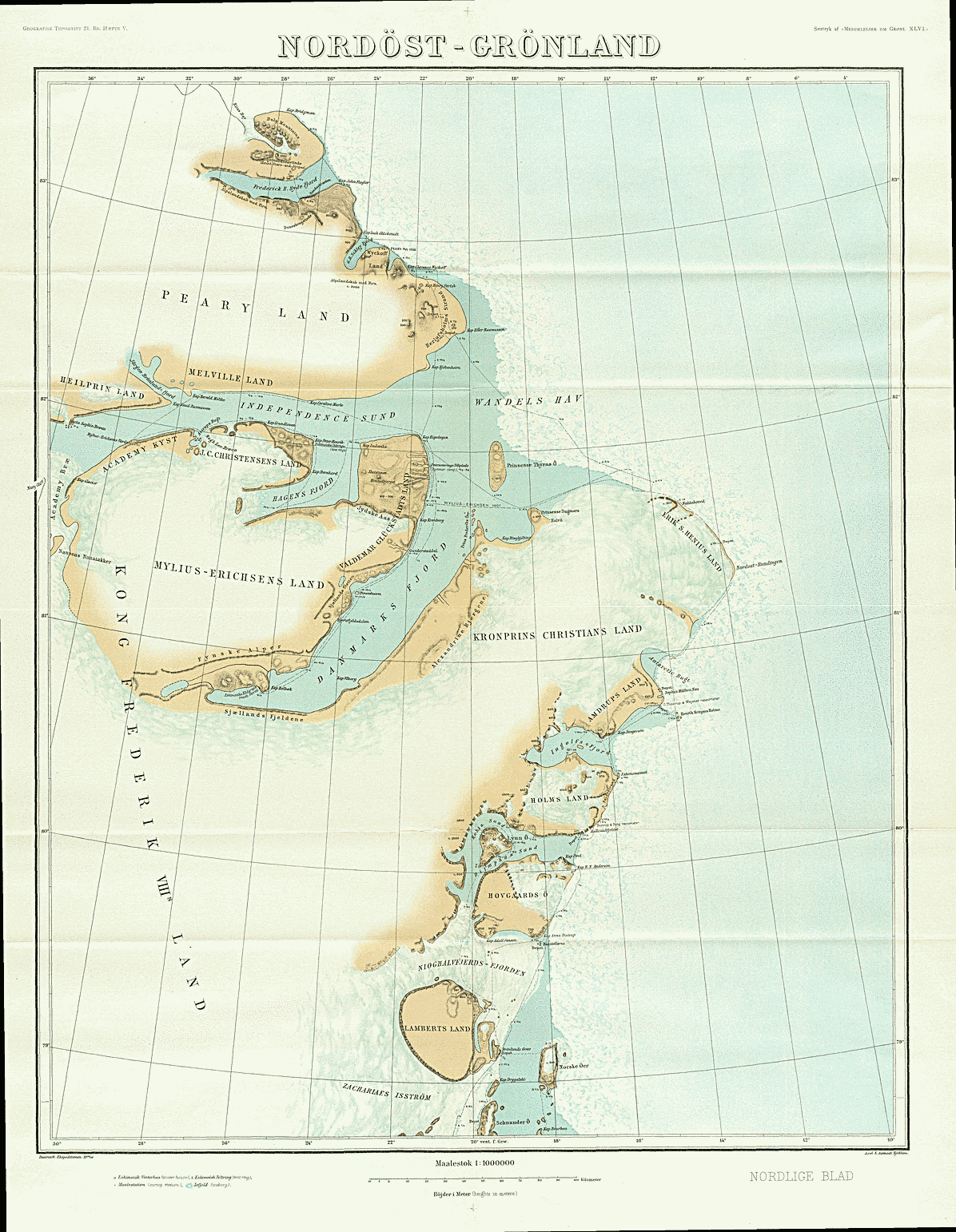
1911 map of NE Greenland by J. P. Koch showing Wyckoff Land.

== See also ==
- Robert Peary§1898–1902 expeditions
- Independence I culture
