= John Godfrey Moore =

American businessman, financier and Wall Street stock market promoter

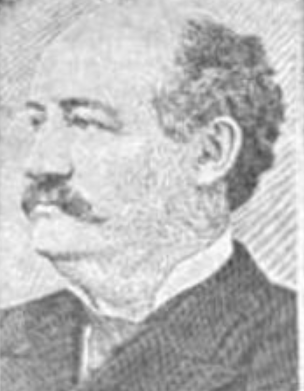
- Born: July 7, 1847; Steuben, Maine
- Died: June 24, 1899 (aged 51); New York, New York
- Occupation: Businessman
- Political party: Republican
- Spouses: Miriam Jane Aldrich (m. 1872; died 1890) Louise Taylor Hartshorne (m. 1894)
- Children: 3

John Godfrey Moore (July 7, 1847 – June 24, 1899) was an American businessman, financier and Wall Street stock market promoter during the Gilded Age. He gained fame by successfully suing the United States government in 1893, on constitutional grounds, to stop the new income tax Act from coming into effect, delaying it by 20 years.

== Early life ==
Moore was born in 1847 in Steuben, Maine, a small ocean-side village of fishermen and small farmers. He was the son of ship Captain Henry Dyer Moore and Maria Godfrey. Moore received his schooling in the region, completing high school in 1865.

== Moves to New York City ==
He moved to New York City in 1865 to work for his uncle in the lumber business. He found success, and soon formed his own company.

Moore made a dredging company partnership with John O. Evans in 1868.

Moore and associates successfully diversified into the booming telegraph business in 1880, founding the American Union Telegraph Company. They expanded their trade, and eventually sold out to larger companies.

== Financier ==
With his profits, Moore then moved into the stock trading and promotion business, and by 1885 was co-owner of the Wall Street firm Moore and Schley, with partner Grant B. Schley. The firm prospered very successfully in the expanding economy, and built many important business and government connections in Philadelphia and Washington, D.C. It did business with several of the wealthy families in the northeastern United States, including John D. Rockefeller, J. P. Morgan, Theodore Havemeyer, and the Whitney family.

== Sues to prevent income tax ==
In 1893, Moore, a Republican Party supporter, gained national and international fame by filing a lawsuit against the United States government, on constitutional grounds, to stop the new personal income tax, the first peacetime income tax, designed by the United States Congress, from being implemented. He won this case, and so delayed the implementation of the new tax for 20 years, until 1913, when this now-universal measure was successfully enacted.

== Death, family ==
Moore died suddenly in New York City in 1899, leaving a large estate. His partner Schley carried on the business after Moore's death.

Moore married twice. He had two daughters – Ruth and Faith – with his first wife, Miriam Jane Aldrich (1853-1890), of Munson, Massachusetts, whom he married in 1872. Ruth married Arthur Lee, a British military officer, later in 1899, just after her father's death. The couple had met in Kingston, Ontario, where Lee was a professor at the Royal Military College of Canada. With her inheritance, Lee was able to retire from the military in his early 30s, and start a very successful political career in Britain, being elected to the House of Commons in 1900. The couple later donated their country estate – Chequers – in 1917 to the British government for use in perpetuity by successive prime ministers. Lee became Viscount Lee of Fareham, a member of the House of Lords, and Ruth became a Viscountess until her death in 1965; the couple had no children. Faith Moore also moved to Britain, dying there in 1944.

Moore had a son with his second wife, Louise Taylor Hartshorne (June 6, 1867 – February 10, 1923) of New York City, whom he married in 1894. She was the daughter of James Mott Hartshorne, also a Wall Street financier, who had founded his own firm James M. Hartshorne and Brother in 1863.

== Legacy ==
Moore had purchased land near his birthplace, and constructed a famous home known as "Far From The Wolf", planning to turn the district into a resort and retreat for the wealthy to compete with Bar Harbor, Maine. These ambitious plans were never realized to the extent he wished.

Moore's first wife donated her extensive library upon her death.

Maine land owned by Moore and donated by his heirs, following the death of his second wife, became part of present-day Acadia National Park.
