= Wister =

Wister may refer to:

== People ==
- Annis Lee Wister (1830–1908), American translator
- John Caspar Wister (1887–1982), American horticulturist
- Langhorne Wister (1834–1891), American Union Civil War brevet brigadier general
- Owen Wister (1860–1938), American author

== Places ==
- Wister, Oklahoma
- Wister, Philadelphia, Pennsylvania
  - Wister station, a SEPTA station
- Lake Wister, in Oklahoma
  - Lake Wister State Park
- Mount Wister, in Wyoming

== See also ==
- Wistar (disambiguation)
