= Hellefisk Fjord =

Fjord in Greenland

- Hellefiskefjord
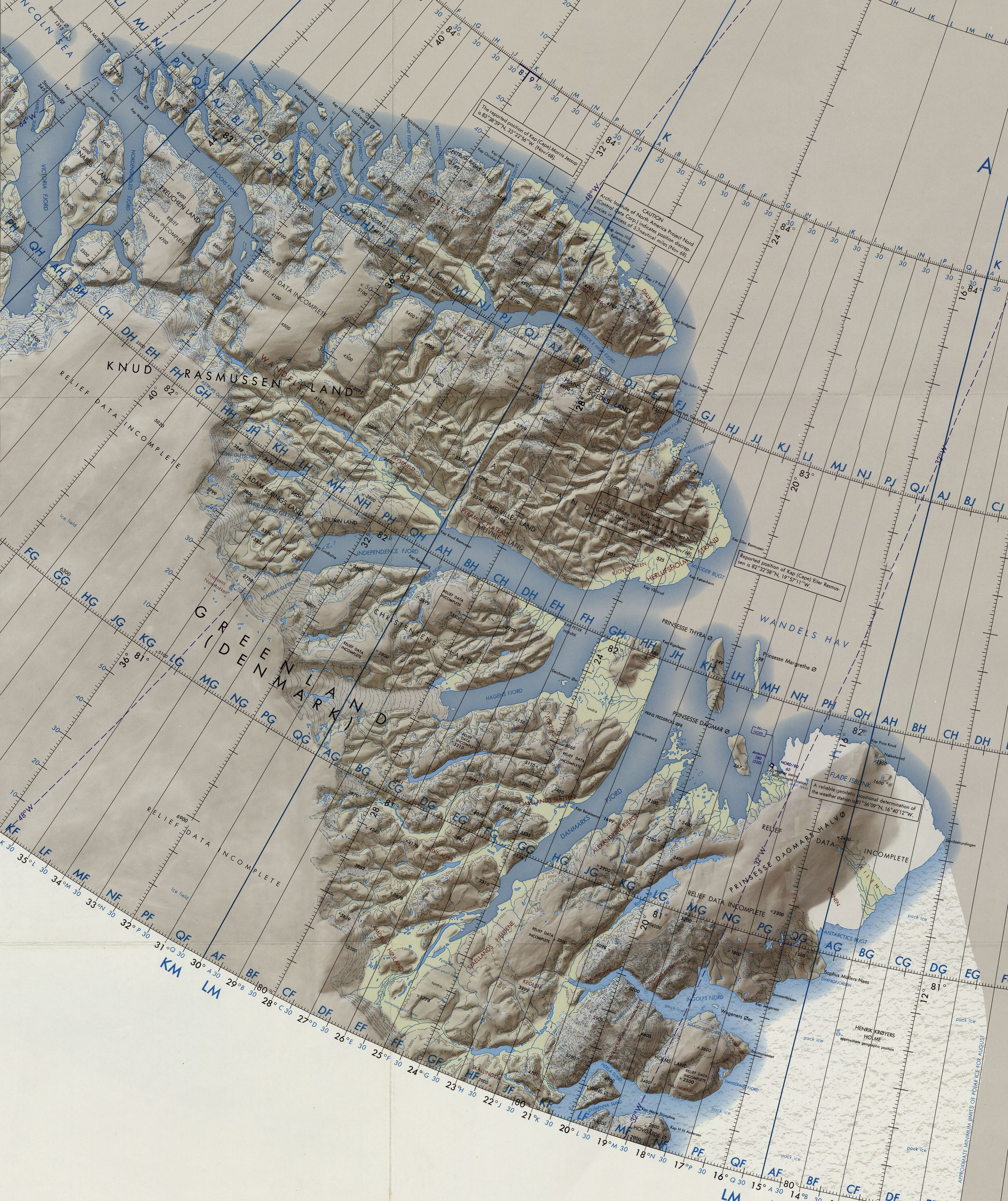
- Map of Northeastern Greenland

- Location in Greenland
- Location: Arctic
- Coordinates: 82°48′N 23°48′W
- Ocean/sea sources: Wandel Sea
- Basin countries: Greenland
- Max. length: 11 km (6.8 mi)
- Max. width: 1.5 km (0.93 mi)

Hellefisk Fjord (Danish: Hellefiskefjord) is a fjord in Peary Land, northern Greenland. To the northeast, the fjord opens into the Wandel Sea of the Arctic Ocean.

This fjord is named after the Greenland halibut (Danish: Hellefisk).

== Geography ==
The Hellefisk Fjord opens in the NNE of Herluf Trolle Land to the east of Wyckoff Land, southwest of Cape Clarence Wyckoff, west of which there is a small bay with an island off Cape Henry Parish. Its mouth is located to the southeast of the mouth of G.B. Schley Fjord. 853 metres (2,799 ft) high Mount Clarence Wyckoff rises to the east of the eastern shore of the fjord.

== See also ==
- List of fjords of Greenland
- Peary Land
