= Citronen mine =

Potential lead and zinc mine in Greenland

- Location within Greenland
- Location: Greenland; 83°0′N 29°55′W
- Products: Lead, Zinc, Germanium
- Opened: not opened
- Company: Ironbark Zinc
- Website: ironbark.gl/projects/greenland/citronen/

The Citronen mine is one of the largest potential lead and zinc mines in Greenland. The mine is located in Citronen Fjord, Northern Greenland. The mine has reserves amounting to 100 million tonnes of ore grading 2% lead and 3% zinc.

The mine was developed by mineral resources company Ironbark Zinc who initially had a nonbinding agreement with the China Nonferrous Metal Mining Group to finance and construct the mine. In 2020, Ironbark Zinc executed a letter of interest for a financing loan from the Export–Import Bank of the United States to develop the project. Initially planning to source financing from both China and the West, the company decided against sourcing from China Nonferrous due to geopolitical factors. In December 2024 Ironbark Zinc sold its interests in the mine for $900,000 to Almeera Ventures Limited based in Dubai.

The company has identified the presence of germanium in the Citronen ore with further assaying underway.
