= Cape Clarence Wyckoff =

Headland in northern Greenland

Cape Clarence Wyckoff Cape Wyckoff Kap Clarence Wyckoff
- Cape
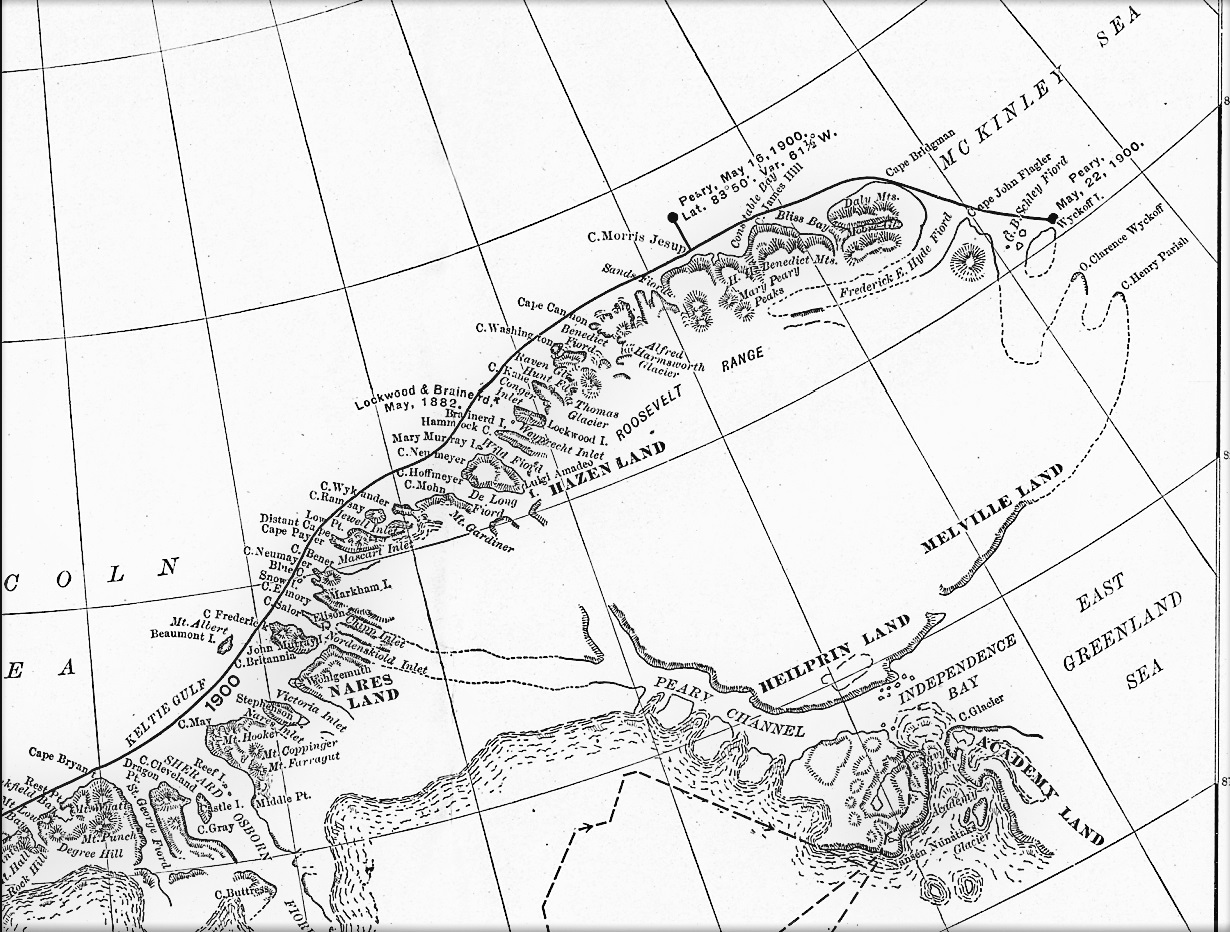
- Peary's 1900 explorations map showing Cape Clarence Wyckoff and Cape Henry Parish in an uncertain position.

- Coordinates: 82°52′N 23°25′W
- Location: Northeast Greenland National Park, Greenland
- Offshore water bodies: Wandel Sea, Arctic Ocean

Area
  - Total: Peary Land, Arctic

Cape Clarence Wyckoff (Danish: Kap Clarence Wyckoff), also known as Cape Wyckoff, is a broad headland in the Wandel Sea, Arctic Ocean, northernmost Greenland. Administratively it is part of the Northeast Greenland National Park.

== History ==
In 1900 Peary explored the north coast of Greenland from Cape Washington in the west to a place he named Wyckoff Island in the east, on the way reaching Cape Morris Jesup, the northernmost point of mainland Greenland. Cape Wyckoff was visible in the distance and was named by Robert Peary after Clarence F. Wyckoff, one of the members of the Peary Arctic Club in New York.

This headland was marked on Robert Peary's map of the eastern coast of North Greenland as guesswork, based on sighting of two headlands from Wyckoff Land, for the visibility was marred by fog. Cape Clarence Wyckoff was finally charted with accuracy by J.P. Koch during the 1906-07 Danmark Expedition.

== Geography ==
Cape Clarence Wyckoff is located in northern Herluf Trolle Land, eastern shore of Peary Land, on the NE side of the mouth of Hellefisk Fjord, and 13 kilometres (42,651 ft) to the NW of Cape Henry Parish. Mount Wyckoff, reaching a height of 850 metres (2,789 ft), rises close to the shore of the point. A small bay lies on the western side, on the right shore of Hellefisk Fjord, and Wyckoff Land lies beyond this bay, about 9 km to the northwest.

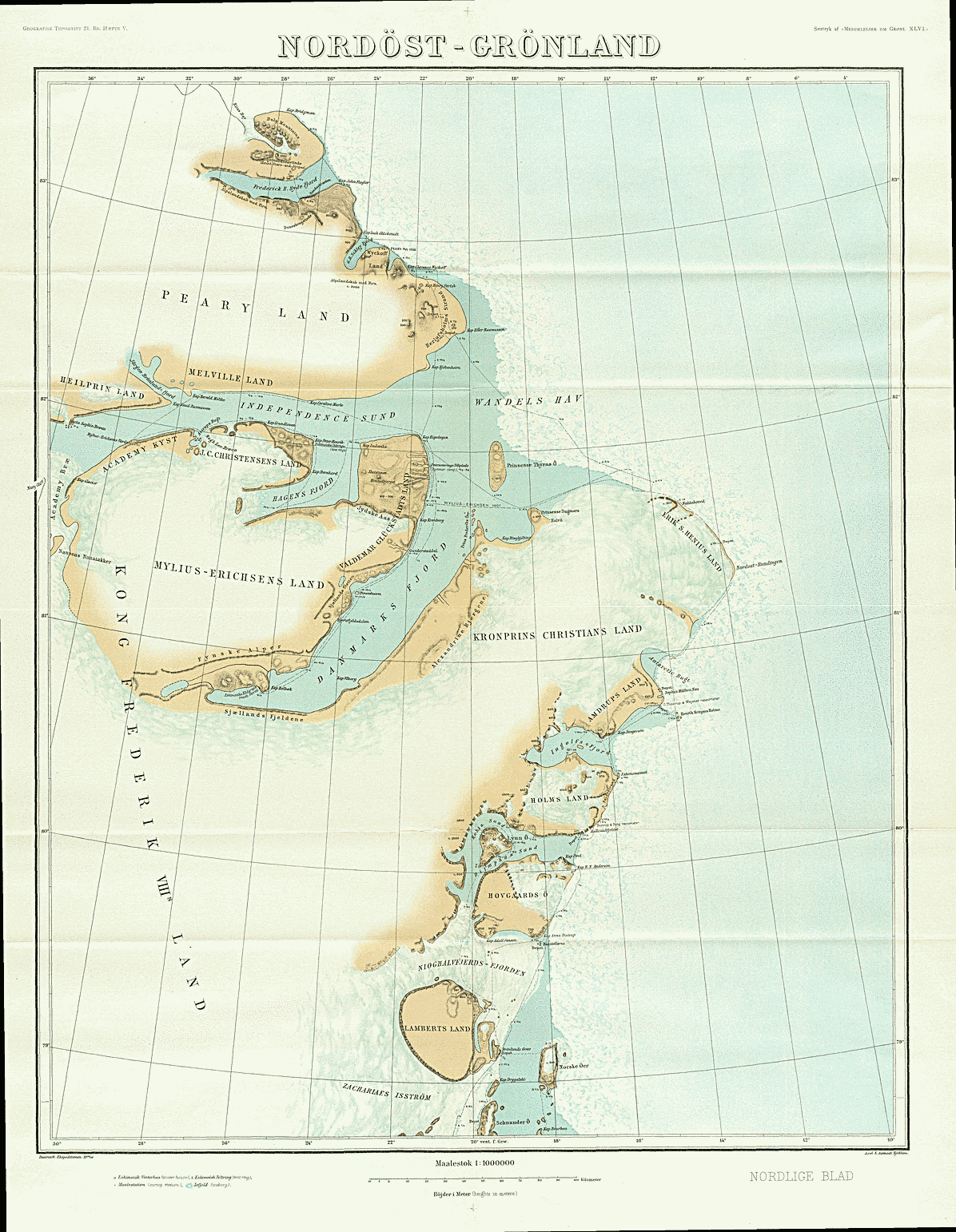
1911 map of NE Greenland by J. P. Koch showing at the top his northernmost explorations.
