= Eiler Rasmussen Eilersen =

Danish landscape painter

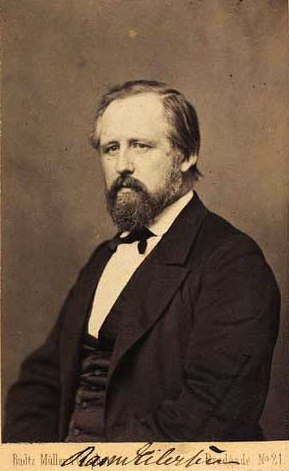
Eiler Rasmussen Eilersen (1870s)

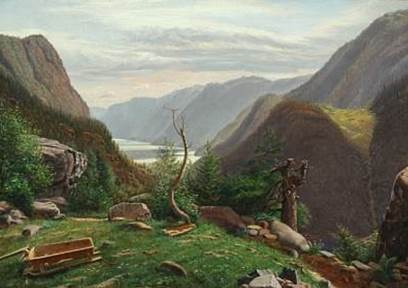
Mountain Landscape with View of the Sea(1869)

Eiler Rasmussen Eilersen (1 March 1827 – 24 April 1912) was a Danish landscape painter.

== Biography ==
Rasmussen Eilersen was born at Østerby, Faaborg-Midtfyn Municipality, Denmark. His father, Rasmus Eilersen (1788-1869), was a farmer and the local parish constable (sognefoged).

Like many future artists, he displayed an early affinity for drawing. Once he had decided on a career as an artist, he obtained the support of Preben Bille-Brahe (1773-1857), a local landowner and philanthropist who was later appointed as a Royal Privy Councillor. Bille-Brahe's son, Christian Bille-Brahe (1819-1899), who would become a government official, was a major patron of Eilersen's work .

He took his first formal lessons in Faaborg then, in 1847, went to Copenhagen to pursue his plans for becoming a landscape painter. The outbreak of the First Schleswig War interrupted his plans, however, when he was drafted into the army. He served for two years, then resumed his studies. He began exhibiting almost immediately, under the name "Rasmussen".

In 1858, after much effort, the Royal Danish Academy of Fine Arts awarded him a travel scholarship. This enabled him and his wife to visit Paris, the Pyrenees and Switzerland. In 1871, he became a member of the Academy. He participated in numerous exhibitions abroad, including the Exposition Universelle (1889).

== Personal life ==
In 1856, he married Eleanor Vinning (1825–1899), whom he had met in Faaborg. He died in Copenhagen in 1912.

== See also ==
- Cape Eiler Rasmussen
