= Mount Wistar =

Mountain in Peary land, Greenland

- Wistar Bjerg
- Location within Greenland

Highest point
- Elevation: 1,737 m (5,699 ft)
- Coordinates: 82°53′15″N 32°30′28″W

Geography
- Location: Peary Land, Greenland
- Parent range: Nordkrone

Climbing
- First ascent: Unclimbed

Mount Wistar (Danish: Wistars Fjeld or Wistar Bjerg) is a mountain in Peary Land, Northern Greenland. Administratively it is part of the Northeast Greenland National Park.

== History ==
Mt Wistar was deemed to have been seen in 1900 by Robert Peary from the northern side of the Frederick E. Hyde Fjord. It was named after General Isaac J. Wistar (1827-1905), then President of the Academy of Natural Sciences in Philadelphia. Peary thought he recognized it as a mountain he had seen from Navy Cliff in his 1892 expedition. It was mapped by Danish Arctic explorer Lauge Koch and named (Wistars Fjeld) during his Cartographic Air Expedition of 1938. In 1950 Eigil Knuth, the leader of the Danish Peary Land Expedition, asserted that the mountain was part of Nordkrone.

== Geography ==
Mt Wistar is the highest peak of the Nordkrone and is located to the south of the middle stretch of Frederick E. Hyde Fjord in Peary Land, east of the eastern shore of Thor Fjord and west of Freja Fjord. The mountain rises northwest of the Balder Glacier.

Polar climate prevails in the area of Mt Wistar, the average annual temperature in the area being −17 °C (1 °F). The warmest month is July when the average temperature rises to −2 °C (28 °F) and the coldest is April with −24 °C (−11 °F).

Map of the Nares Strait area.

== See also ==
- List of mountains in Greenland
- Peary Land

== Bibliography ==
- Greenland geology and selected mineral occurrences - GEUS
