= Frederick E. Hyde Fjord =

Fjord in Peary Land, Greenland

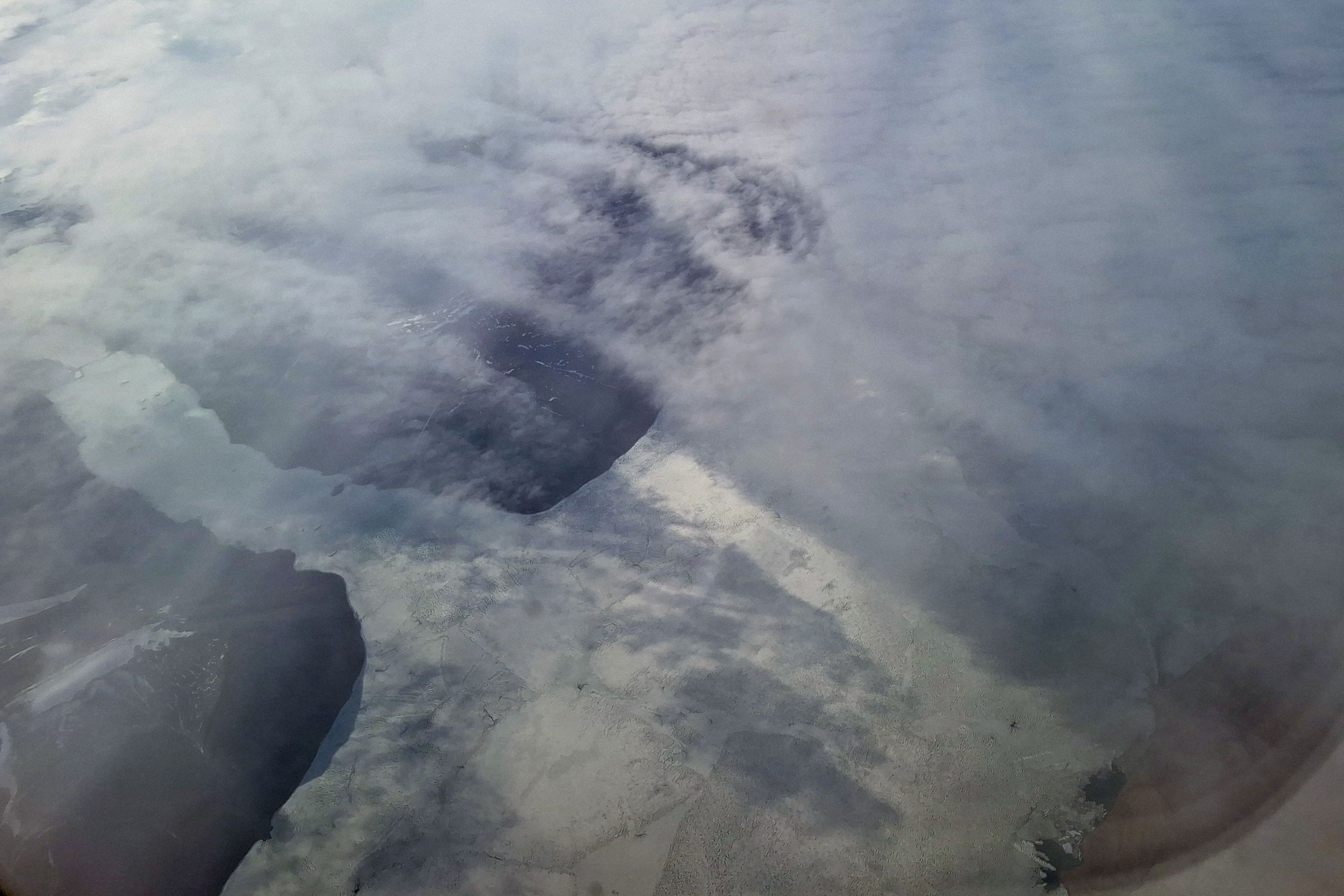
- Aerial photo in July 2026, looking southwest; Freja Fjord is visible to the left

- Location in Greenland
- Location: Arctic
- Coordinates: 83°04′N 31°15′W
- Ocean/sea sources: Wandel Sea, Arctic Ocean
- Basin countries: Greenland
- Max. length: 140 km (87 mi)
- Max. width: 7 km (4.3 mi)
- Frozen: All year
- Settlements: None

Frederick E. Hyde Fjord is a fjord in Peary Land, far northern Greenland.

== History ==
The fjord was named by Robert Peary during his 1900 expedition after Frederick Erastus Hyde, one of the founding members and first vice-president of the Peary Arctic Club in New York. Peary did not explore the fjord owing to thick fog. The inner fjord branches were mapped and named by Lauge Koch in the course of aerial surveys from the 1920s onwards.

The landscape of this desolate fjord caused an impression on Danish Arctic explorer Eigil Knuth:

The journey through Frederick E. Hyde Fjord was not only my greatest experience in Peary Land, but revealed the most beautiful scenery I have ever seen in Greenland.

== Geography ==
To the east Frederick E. Hyde Fjord opens into the Arctic Ocean with its mouth just to the north of Cape John Flagler and south of Cape Bridgman. The fjord extends 95 km (59 mi) in a WSW direction until the Harebugt at its head. The Nordpasset is a glacial valley that extends a further 25 km (16 mi) in a WNW direction until the head of O.B. Boggild Fjord, part of the De Long Fjord complex.

Freja Fjord, Thor Fjord and Odin Fjord are branches on the southern shore of the fjord, about 65 km (40 mi), 95 km (59 mi) and 120 km (75 mi) from its mouth respectively; smaller Citronen Fjord lies about 45 km (28 mi) from the mouth. Frigg Fjord is an offshoot on the northern shore located 95 km (59 mi) from the mouth.

The Roosevelt Range, the northernmost mountain range on earth, stretches from west to east on the northern side of the fjord along with its subranges. Hans Egede Land extends to the south of the fjord from its middle reaches to the mouth area. The 1,280 m (4,200 ft) high Nordkrone plateau is located on the southern side of Frederick E. Hyde Fjord. Nordkrone has many glaciers and is intersected by deep ravines with steep sides. 1,737 m (5,699 ft) high Wistar Bjerg, one of the highest points in Peary Land, rises above the fjord between the Freya and Thor fjords at the edge of the plateau.

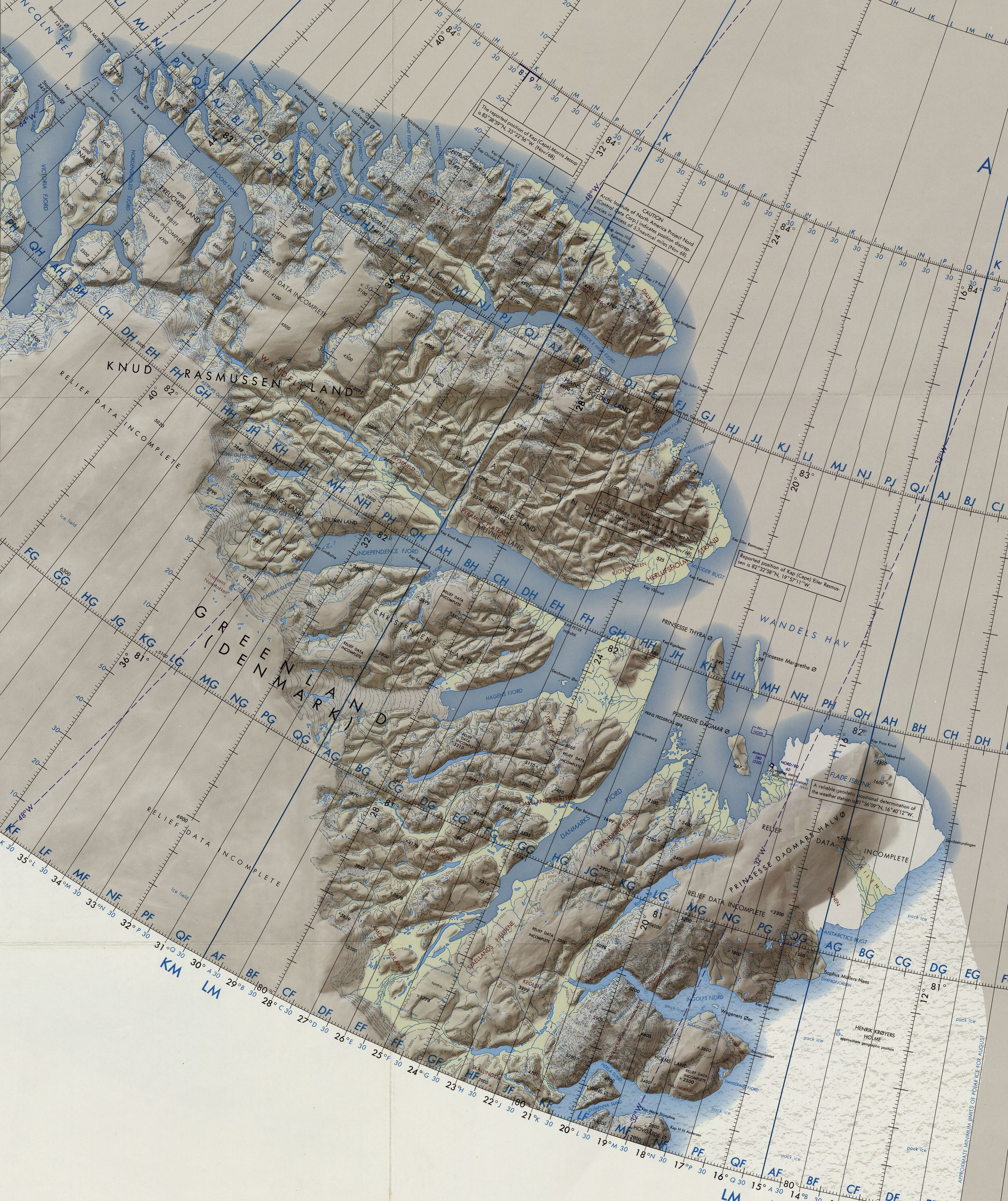
Map of Far Northeastern Greenland

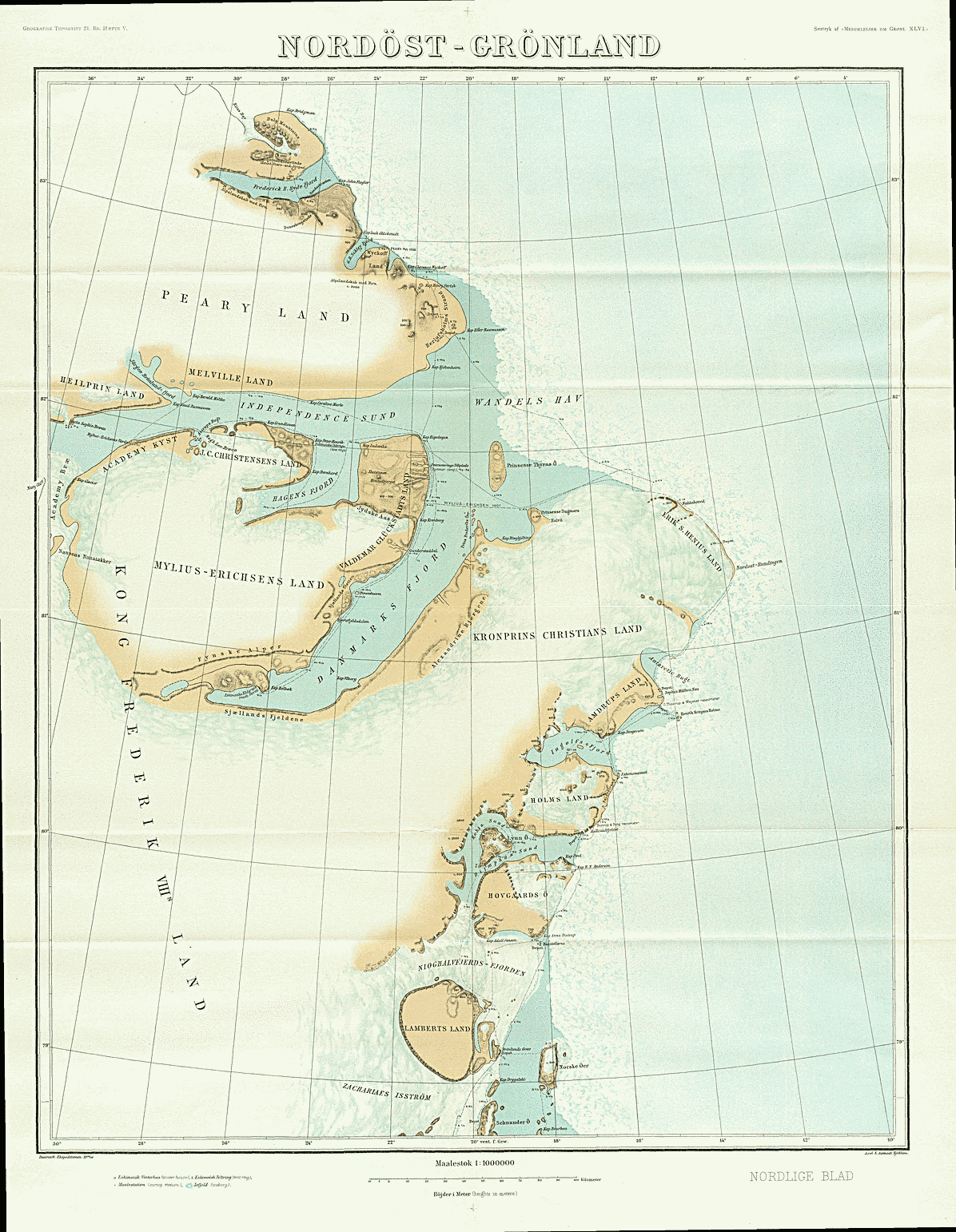
1911 map of NE Greenland showing only a short stretch of the partly unexplored Frederick E. Hyde Fjord

== See also ==
- List of fjords of Greenland
