= Isaac J. Wistar =

American lawyer, miner, farmer, soldier, and author (1827-1905)

Isaac Jones Wistar
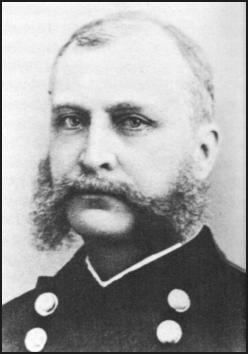
- Isaac Jones Wistar
- Born: November 14, 1827; Philadelphia, Pennsylvania, US
- Died: September 18, 1905 (aged 77); Claymont, Delaware, US
- Burial place: Wistar Institute, Philadelphia, Pennsylvania
- Military career
- Allegiance: United States of America; Union
- Branch: United States Army; Union Army
- Service years: 1861–1864
- Rank: Brigadier General
- Conflicts: American Civil War
- Other work: Writer, penologist

Isaac Jones Wistar (November 14, 1827 – September 18, 1905) was an American lawyer, miner, farmer, soldier, and author. He served in the Union Army during the American Civil War, in which he was wounded twice, and was noted for his criticized performance during the 1864 Bermuda Hundred Campaign. After the conflict Wistar became a distinguished penologist and a writer.

== Early life and career ==
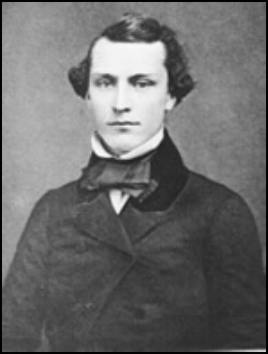
Wistar in early life

Isaac J. Wistar was born in 1827 in Philadelphia, Pennsylvania. He received early his education at Westtown Friends' School, and then attended Haverford College. Wistar later received a Doctor of Science degree from the University of Pennsylvania.

Wistar began practicing as a lawyer in Philadelphia. In 1849, he moved to California in order to participate as a miner in the Gold Rush. From then until the outbreak of the American Civil War in 1861, Wistar held a great variety of vocations. Among these were: animal trapper, mountaineer, Indian fighter, farmer, and lawyer.

== Civil War service ==
At the beginning of the American Civil War in 1861, Wistar chose to follow his home state and the Union cause. He raised a company of men and was elected its captain. Wistar's company was added to the 71st Pennsylvania Infantry, originally known as the California Regiment. This regiment was organized at Fort Schuyler in New York. On June 28, Wistar was promoted to the rank of lieutenant colonel, and on July 1 the 71st left for Fortress Monroe on the Virginia Peninsula. On July 22, Wistar and the 71st was then ordered to Washington, D.C., forming part of the capital's defenses until that fall. Wistar participated in the much-publicized Union defeat in the Battle of Ball's Bluff on October 21. In the fight, he temporarily led the regiment and was seriously wounded, hit in his right elbow, his jaw, and thigh.

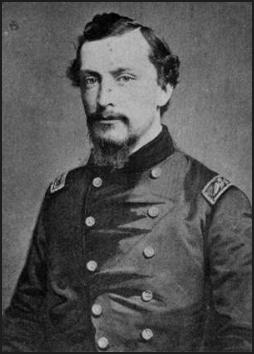
Wistar as a colonel in the Union Army

Following the death of Col. Edward D. Baker at Ball's Bluff, Wistar became the commander of the 71st Pennsylvania, and was promoted to colonel on November 11, 1861. The 71st participated in the Peninsular Campaign of 1862, although it isn't clear whether Wistar was actually present; at the Battle of Seven Pines (May 31 and June 1) the regiment was led by its major, and during the Seven Days Battles (June 30 and July 1) commanded by its lieutenant colonel.

Wistar fought in the Battle of Antietam on September 17, 1862, and was wounded in his left arm. His commander, Oliver O. Howard, reported on Wistar's new injuries, saying "... with his right arm nearly useless from a former wound, had his left disabled," referring to the previous Ball's Bluff wounds. On November 29 Wistar was promoted to brigadier general, and he was assigned to brigade command in the VII Corps beginning on May 16, 1863.

Beginning on July 18, 1863, Wistar commanded the District of Yorktown in Virginia, and that August the post was re-designated as a subdistrict of the Department of Virginia and North Carolina. In April 1864, he briefly was given divisional command of the XVIII in the Army of the James. On May 7, Wistar resumed leading a brigade and participated in the Bermuda Hundred Campaign, but 11 days later he was relieved of duty and replaced by Col. Griffen Stedman. Military historian Ezra J. Warner surmises Wistar performed poorly during this campaign:

The conclusion is more or less inescapable, although nothing concrete appears in the records, that Wistar's handling of his brigade on the foggy morning of May 16 left something to be desired.

Wistar's resignation from the Union Army was accepted by the U.S. War Department on September 15, 1864.

== Postbellum career ==
Wistar resumed his law practice in Philadelphia, and he also was a noted penologist. He served as vice president of the Pennsylvania Railroad Company, leading its coal and canal components. Wistar founded the Wistar Institute of Anatomy and Biology at the University of Pennsylvania in 1892, and also served as Inspector of the Pennsylvania State Penitentiary, both located in Philadelphia. He also served as president of the Pennsylvania State Board of Charities, the American Philosophical Society, and the Academy of Natural Sciences in Philadelphia.

Wistar authored several works, including an autobiography and writings about war and penology. He retired in 1903 and died two years later at his summer home in Claymont, New Castle County, Delaware. Mount Wistar in Greenland was named after him by Robert Peary in his 1898-1902 expedition.

Selected works

- Prison System of Pennsylvania (1900)
- Autobiography of Isaac Jones Wistar, 1827-1905 (1905)
- Half a Century in War and Peace (1914, posthumous)

== Personal ==
Wistar married Sarah Toland (1838–1895) in 1863, but the couple were childless. He was a widower for the last decade of his life, and bequeathed the bulk of his wealth to the Wistar Institute in 1905. His New York Times obituary noted that the endowment he established prior to his death generated an annual return of $30,000. Instead of being buried beside his wife at Laurel Hill Cemetery, Wistar was interred at the institute.

== See also ==
- List of American Civil War generals (Union)
