= Yokohl Valley, California =

Unincorporated community in California, United States

Yokohl Valley
- Unincorporated community
- Location in California Yokohl Valley (the United States)
- Coordinates: 36°17′24″N 119°04′12″W
- Country: United States
- State: California
- County: Tulare
- Elevation: 463 ft (141 m)

Yokohl Valley is an unincorporated community in Tulare County, California, United States. It lies at an elevation of 463 feet (141 m). Currently, the Yokohl Valley area constitutes the easternmost part of Exeter ,along the foothills. Yokohl Valley may be reached through Rocky Hill Road from the west, Myer Drive from the south and Yokohl Drive from the north, off CA Hwy 198.

Yokohl Valley was the site of a controversial development that would have built 10,000 homes in the foothills. Facing opposition from environmental preservation groups and steep costs of utilities, the developer cancelled the project in 2018.
