= Skylark Minerals =

Ironbark Zinc
- Type: Public
- Traded as: ASX: IBG
- Industry: Metals and Mining
- Founded: 2006
- Headquarters: Perth, Australia
- Key people: Jonathan Downes (MD)
- Products: Zinc
- Website: www.ironbark.gl

Ironbark Zinc Limited is an Australian Securities Exchange listed (ASX: IBG) mineral resources company focused on the development of the Citronen mine Zinc Project in Greenland.

== History ==
The Ironbark company listed on the ASX in August 2006 as Ironbark Gold and in March 2007 acquired the Citronen Project. To reflect its core focus on zinc and the Citronen Project, the company changed its name to Ironbark Zinc in November 2009. Ironbark's goal is to develop the Citronen Project into a major base metal mining operation in Greenland. The project hosts in excess of 10 billion pounds of zinc and lead, and has a JORC-compliant Resource of 55.8 million tonnes at 6.1% zinc and lead.

In 2013, Ironbark completed a Definitive Feasibility Study which confirmed the Citronen Project's development potential and in October 2014, the company submitted a Mining License Application for the project. Ironbark has a non-binding Memorandum of Understanding with China Non-Ferrous Metal Industry's Foreign Engineering and Construction Co. Ltd. (‘China Non-Ferrous’, ‘NFC’) for the construction and financing of the project, which provides NFC the option to purchase 19.9% of the Citronen Project and the right to enter into an offtake agreement for a portion of the project's concentrate at such time it is in production. Ironbark has strong and supportive shareholders which include Glencore International AG and Nyrstar NV.

== Other projects ==
Ironbark also has a portfolio of other prospective base and precious metals projects in Greenland and Australia. These include:

The Mestersvig Base Metal Project in eastern Greenland. The project comprises two 100% owned tenements which contain the historic high-grade Blyklippen Zinc-Lead Mine and the Sortebjerg Zinc-Lead Prospect.

Washington Land Project in North West Greenland. The project contains the Cass Fjord base and precious metals prospect.

Peakview base and precious metals Project in Australia. The project is located near Cooma in New South Wales and contains several base and precious metal prospects.

Captains Flat base and precious metals Project in Australia. The project is located 50 km southeast of Canberra in New South Wales and covers an area of over 240 square kilometres around the old mining town of Captains Flat.
