= Mount Clarence Wyckoff =

Mountain in Peary Land, Greenland

- Clarence Wyckoff Fjeld
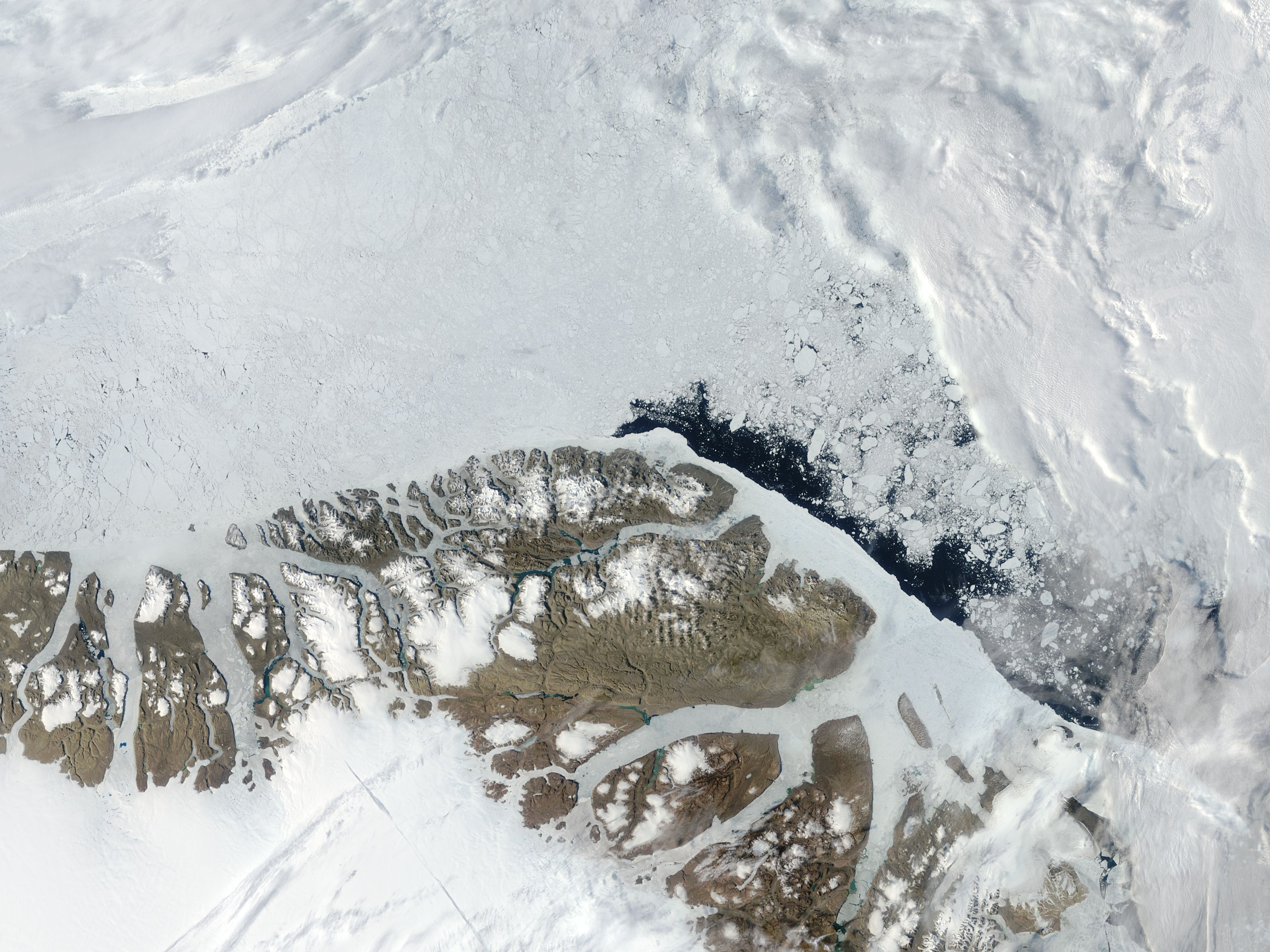
- Satellite image of the northern end of Greenland

Highest point
- Elevation: 853 m (2,799 ft)
- Prominence: 290 m (950 ft)
- Listing: List of mountains in Greenland
- Coordinates: 82°48′N 23°20′W

Geography
- Location within Greenland
- Location: Peary Land, Greenland
- Parent range: Peary Land

Mount Clarence Wyckoff (Danish: Clarence Wyckoff Fjeld or Clarence Wyckoff Bjerg) is a mountain in Peary Land, Northern Greenland. Administratively the mountain belongs to the Northeast Greenland National Park.

The peak was named after Clarence F. Wyckoff, one of the members of the Peary Arctic Club in New York.

The Wyckoff Bjerg Formation is named after the mountain. Fossils dating back to the Cambrian have been found in it.

== Geography ==
Mount Clarence Wyckoff is located to the north of Herlufsholm Strand, 18.5 kilometres (11 mi) northwest of Cape Henry Parish. Rising above the eastern shore of Hellefisk Fjord, the 853 metres (2,799 ft) high peak is the highest in the coastal area. The same mountain is mentioned as a 951 metres (3,120 ft) high peak with a prominence of 290 m (950 ft) according to other sources.

== See also ==
- List of fossiliferous stratigraphic units in Greenland
- List of mountains in Greenland
- Herluf Trolle Land
