= Cape John Flagler =

Headland in northeast Greenland

Cape John Flagler Kap John Flagler
- Headland
- Map of Northern Ellesmere Island and far Northern Greenland

- Coordinates: 83°10′N 26°00′W
- Location: Northeast Greenland National Park, Greenland
- Offshore water bodies: Wandel Sea, Arctic Ocean

Area
  - Total: Arctic

Cape John Flagler (Danish: Kap John Flagler) is a headland in the Wandel Sea, Arctic Ocean, northeast Greenland. Administratively it is part of the Northeast Greenland National Park.

The cape was named in 1900 by Robert Peary after John M. Flagler, one of the members of the Peary Arctic Club in New York.

== Geography ==
Cape John Flagler is located on the southern side of the mouth of Frederick E. Hyde Fjord, Peary Land.

Cape Bridgman is the headland on the northern side of the fjord entrance and was Robert Peary's easternmost accurate geographic exploration in the north of Greenland, for further south, he encountered fog.
