= Wandel Sea =

Body of water in the Arctic Ocean from northeast of Greenland to Svalbard

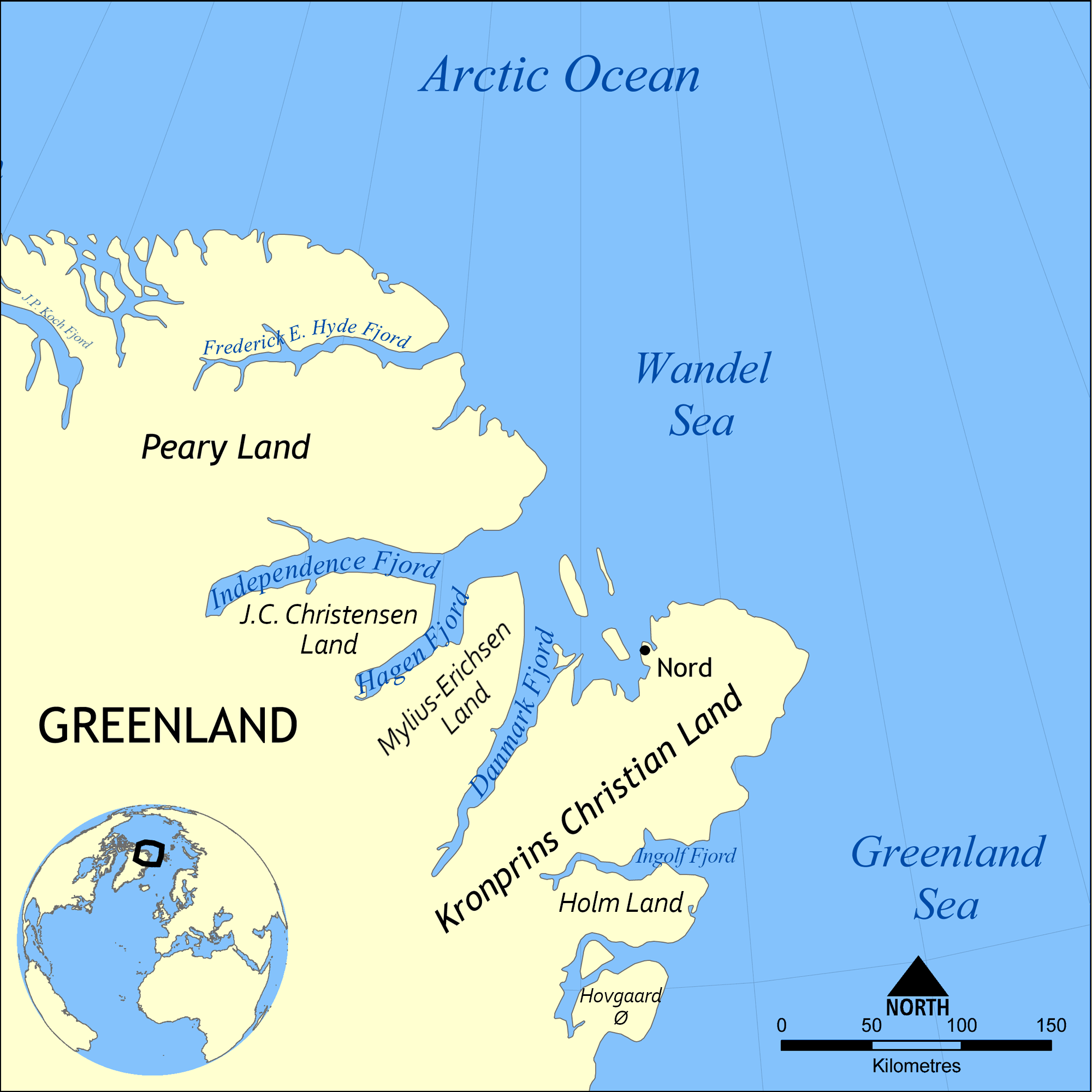
- Western part of the Wandel Sea

- Location within Greenland
- Location: Greenland Sea
- Coordinates: 82°15′N 17°00′W
- Type: Sea
- Basin countries: Greenland and Norway
- Max. length: 800 km (500 mi)

The Wandel Sea (Danish: Wandelhavet; also known as McKinley Sea) is a body of water in the Greenland Sea, stretching from northeast of Greenland to Svalbard. It is obstructed by ice most of the year.

This sea is named after Danish polar explorer and hydrographer, Vice Admiral Carl Frederick Wandel, who in the years 1895–96 explored the coastal waters of Greenland as part of the Danish Ingolf Expedition.

== Geography ==
This arctic sea is located at 82° north longitude and 21° west latitude. Seas farther north and northwest of the Wandel Sea were once frozen year-round but now may have open water in late summer, as of August 2018. The Wandel Sea stretches westward as far as Cape Morris Jesup. Further west is the Lincoln Sea. In the south, it stretches to Nordostrundingen. The Wandel Sea connects to the Greenland Sea in the south through the Fram Strait.

Independence Fjord and Frederick E. Hyde Fjord are two great fjords of the far-northeast Greenland coast having their mouths in the Wandel Sea. G.B. Schley Fjord and Hellefisk Fjord are smaller fjords located between both.

Islands include Princess Thyra Island, the largest, Kaffeklubben Island, the northernmost, and Princess Dagmar Island, located not far from Station Nord, the only inhabited place in the area.

== See also ==
- List of seas
