= Princess Dagmar Island =

Island in Greenland

Prinsesse Dagmar Ø
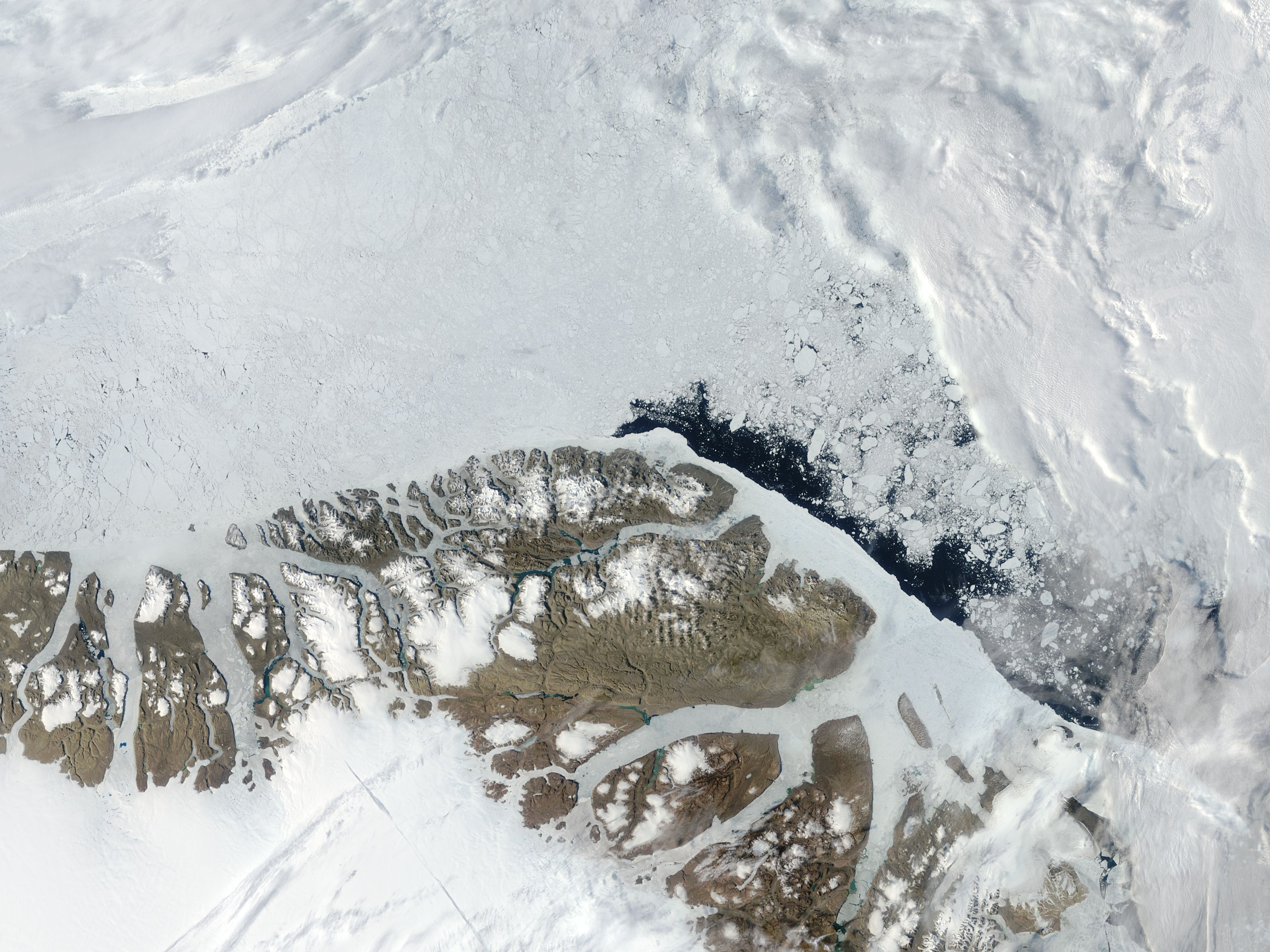
- Satellite image of The northern end of Greenland including Princess Dagmar Island

- Location within Greenland

Geography
- Location: Wandel Sea
- Coordinates: 81°39′N 19°57′W
- Area: 144.5 km^{2} (55.8 sq mi)
- Length: 21 km (13 mi)
- Width: 6 km (3.7 mi)
- Highest elevation: 111.8 m (366.8 ft)

Administration
- Denmark
- Zone: Northeast Greenland National Park

Demographics
- Population: 0

Princess Dagmar Island (Danish: Prinsesse Dagmar Ø) is an uninhabited coastal island of the Wandel Sea in King Frederick VIII Land, Greenland.

The island was named after Princess Dagmar of Denmark.

The Danish military base/weather station Nord is located in the mainland east of the island, on the western side of Crown Prince Christian Land Peninsula.

In Vol. 14 of the Encyclopedia Arctica (unpublished, completed in 1951), Princess Dagmar Island is still not recognized as an island, but mentioned as a peninsula.

== Geography ==
Princess Dagmar Island is located to the southeast of Princess Thyra Island and to the south of Princess Margaret Island, close to the coast of Crown Prince Christian Land in far northeastern Greenland. The island lies in a bay of the Wandel Sea formed by the confluence of Denmark Sound and Independence Sound. The island has an area of 144.5 km ² and has a shoreline of 55,8 kilometres.

The region of Greenland where the island lies was part of Avannaa, originally Nordgrønland ("North Greenland"), a former county of Greenland until 31 December 2008. The island is presently within the Northeast Greenland National Park.

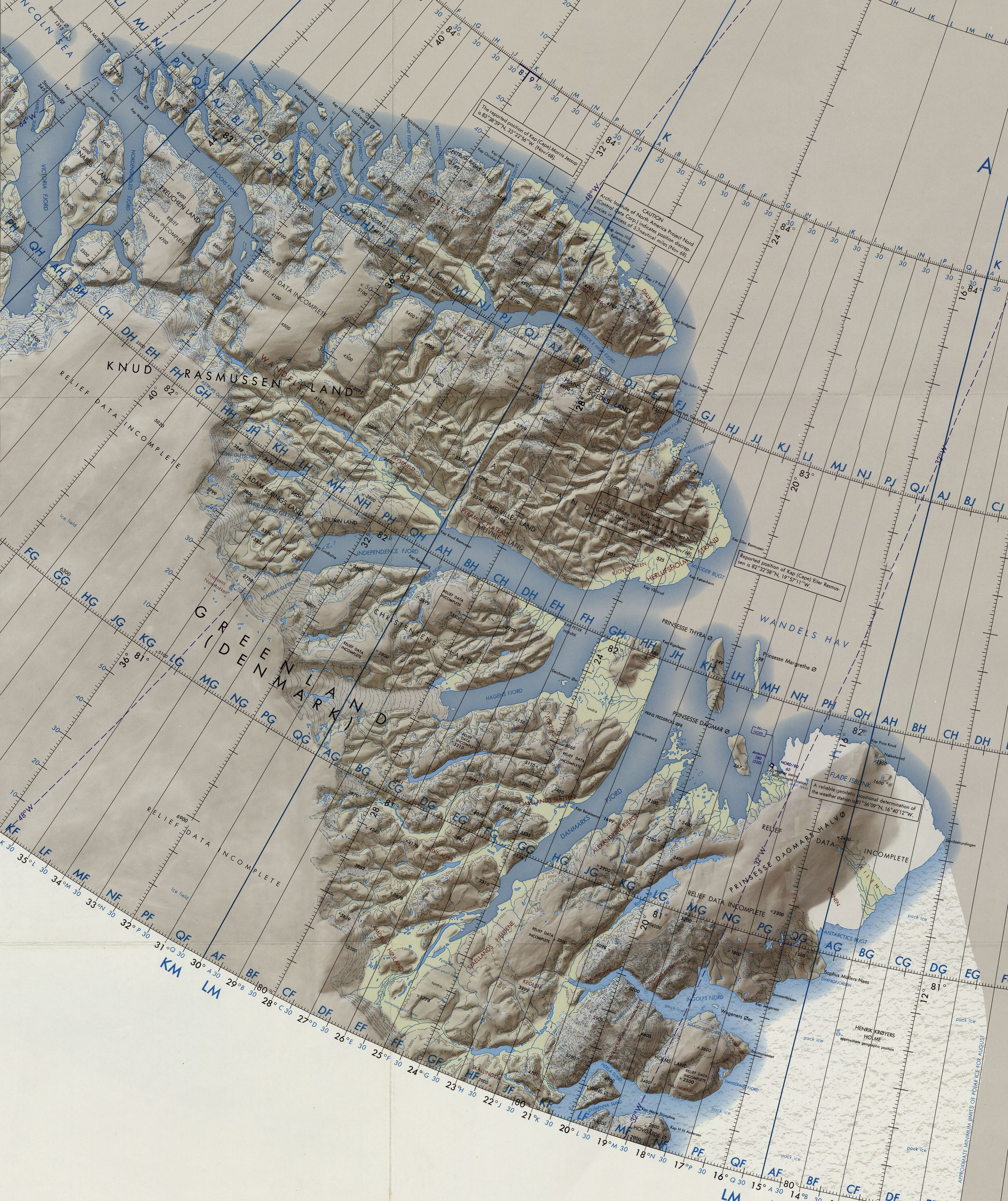
Map of Northeastern Greenland.

== See also ==
- List of islands of Greenland
