= Romer Lake =

Land-locked freshwater fjord in Greenland

- Romer Sø
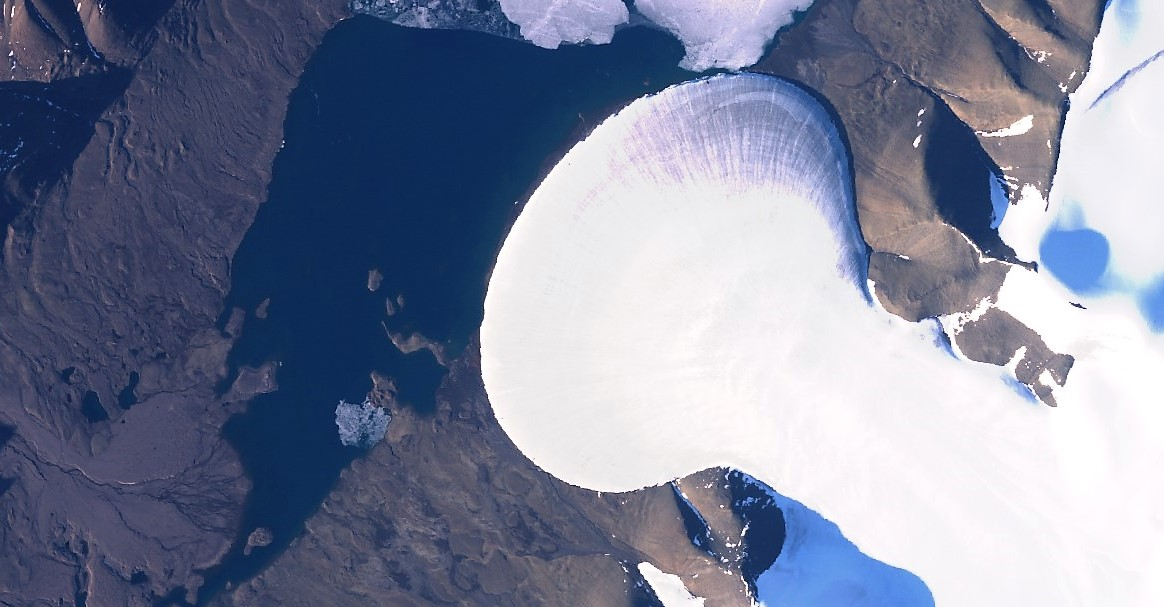
- Romer Lake Sentinel-2 image

- Location in Greenland
- Location: NE Greenland
- Coordinates: 81°0′N 19°5′W
- Type: Fjord
- Primary outflows: Nunataami Elv
- Ocean/sea sources: Ingolf Sound, Greenland Sea
- Basin countries: Greenland, Denmark
- Max. length: 60 km (37 mi)
- Max. width: 6 km (3.7 mi)
- Surface area: 225 km^{2} (87 sq mi)

Romer Lake (Danish: Romer Sø) is a land-locked freshwater fjord at the northern end of King Frederick VIII Land, near Greenland's northeastern coast. The Danish military base/weather station Nord —the only inhabited place in the area— lies 50 km (31 mi) to the northeast. The lake and its surroundings are part of the Northeast Greenland National Park zone.

Romer Lake was first mapped in 1933 by Lauge Koch during aerial surveys made during the 1931–34 Three-year Expedition to East Greenland (Treårsekspeditionen). It was likely named after the Danish Astronomer/Inventor Ole Rømer (1644–1710).

== Geography ==
Romer Lake is located at the western end of the Crown Prince Christian Land peninsula to the west of the Princess Elizabeth Alps. It lies in long and narrow depression running parallel to the Denmark Fjord system further north and stretching roughly from NE to SW for about 80 km (50 mi). A glacier has its terminus at the northern end and the Nunataami Elv river valley flows out of the southern end of the lake and, bending south through the valley known as Vandredalen, it discharges its waters in the northern inner arm of the Ingolf Sound of the Greenland Sea.

=== Elephant Foot Glacier ===
Romer Lake is famous for its impressive Elephant Foot Glacier, a wide piedmont glacier with a strikingly-shaped 5.4 kilometres (3 mi) wide terminal lobe flowing into the lake from the SE in its central part.

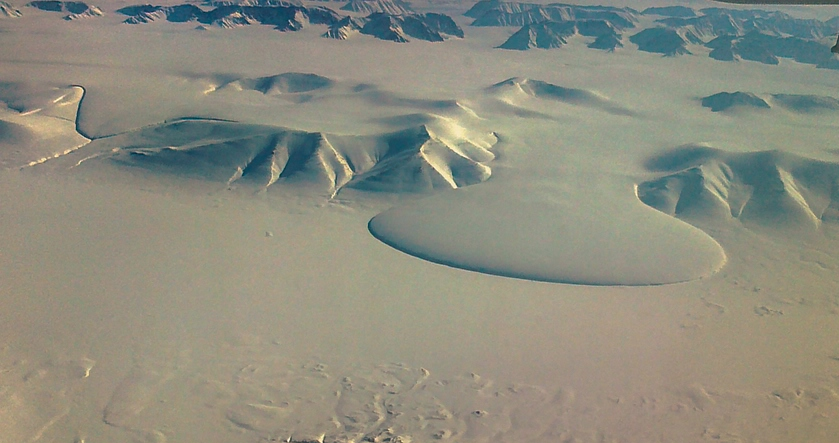
View of the Elephant Foot end moraine at Romer Lake.

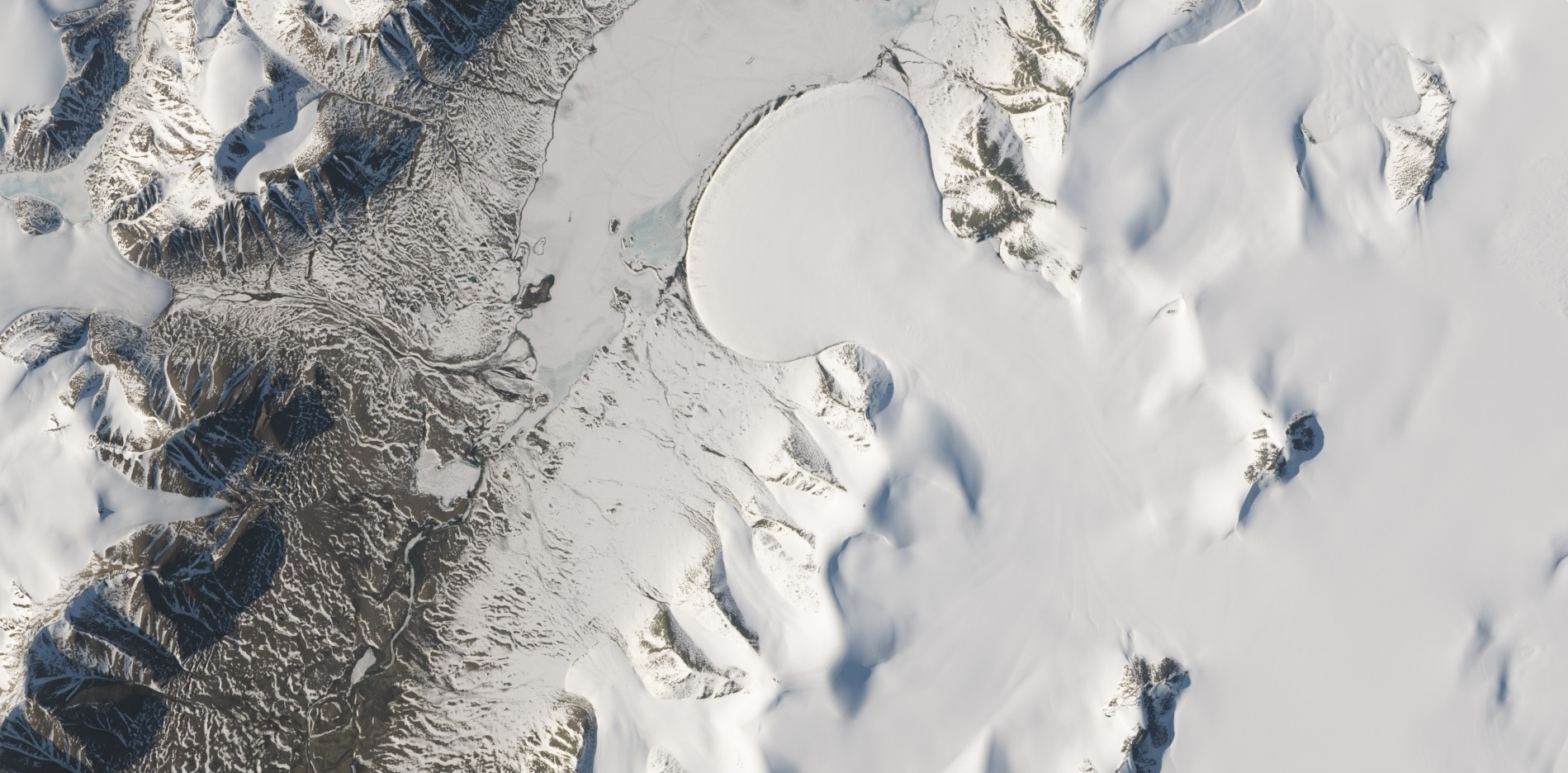
NASA picture of the southern part of Romer Lake with the Elephant Foot Glacier.

== See also ==
- List of fjords of Greenland
