= Ingolf Fjord =

Fjord in Greenland

- Ingolf Sound
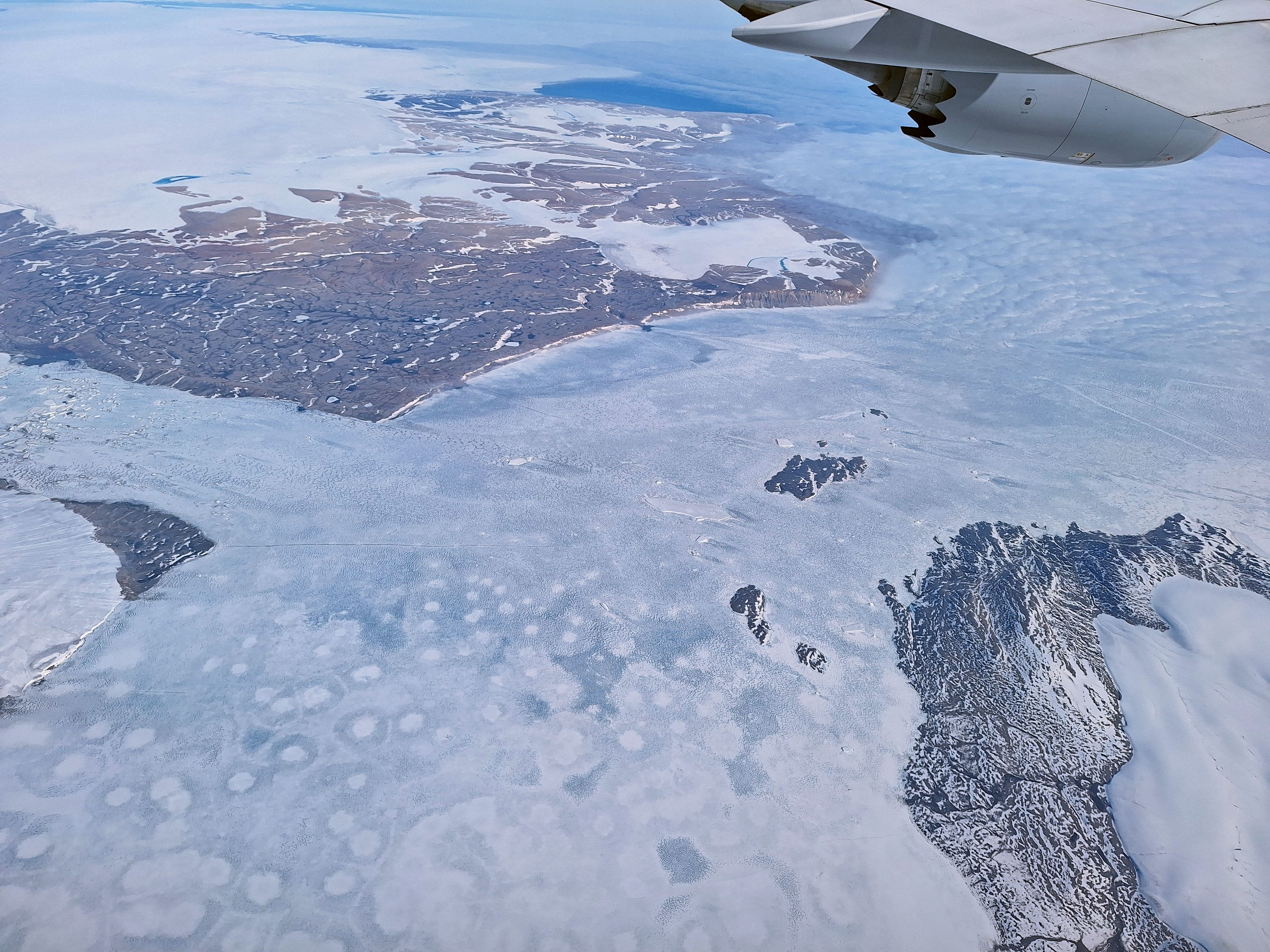
- Aerial photo of the mouth of Ingolf Fjord in July 2026

- Location in Greenland
- Location: NE Greenland
- Coordinates: 80°32′N 17°50′W
- Type: Fjord
- Ocean/sea sources: Greenland Sea
- Basin countries: Greenland, Denmark
- Max. length: 100 km (62 mi)
- Max. width: 16 km (9.9 mi)

Ingolf Fjord (Danish: Ingolfs Fjord), also known as Ingolf Sound, is a fjord of Greenland's northeastern coast in northern King Frederick VIII Land.

The fjord was named by the 1906-1908 Denmark expedition led by Lauge Koch which mapped Greenland's north coast between Cape York and Denmark Sound. It was named after 544-ton schooner Ingolf, used for hydrographic surveys in the waters off Greenland in 1879 and 1895; this vessel had also been used by Andreas Peter Hovgaard on a voyage to the West Indies in 1884–85.

== Geography ==
Ingolf Fjord is located between Holm Land to the south and Amdrup Land to the north at the southern end of the Crown Prince Christian Land peninsula. On its eastern end lie the Wegener Islands, near its mouth in the Greenland Sea. Between Cape Jungersen to the north and Eskimonaesset to the south. On the fjord's southern shore lie the Princess Caroline-Mathilde Alps and the terminus of the Spaerre Brae glacier (Brede Spærregletscher), about 40 km (25 miles) from its mouth. Nunatameporten is a 1,593-metre (5,226 ft) high mountain rising west of the glacier. The Bjørne Glacier discharges from the west side of the outer Ingolf Fjord, draining the Princess Elizabeth Alps range to the north.

The southern end of the Princess Elizabeth Alps and the Hjorne Glacier (Hjørnegletscher) are located on the north side of the inner fjord. A few miles further west the Ingolf Fjord bends to the SSW at a right angle and there is a small arm, Solvig, with valley running SSW at the end of which lies Centrum Lake. The Nunataami Elv river valley — the outflow of Romer Lake further north — discharges at the northern inner arm of the fjord. This arm was formerly believed to form the head of the fjord, but in 1939, the fjord was found to continue further to the west and SW, ending in two short branches in its innermost end, the Månevig branching in a western direction and the Solvig in a southern direction. The Drabe Glacier (Dråbegletscher) is a hanging glacier located on the east side of this area.

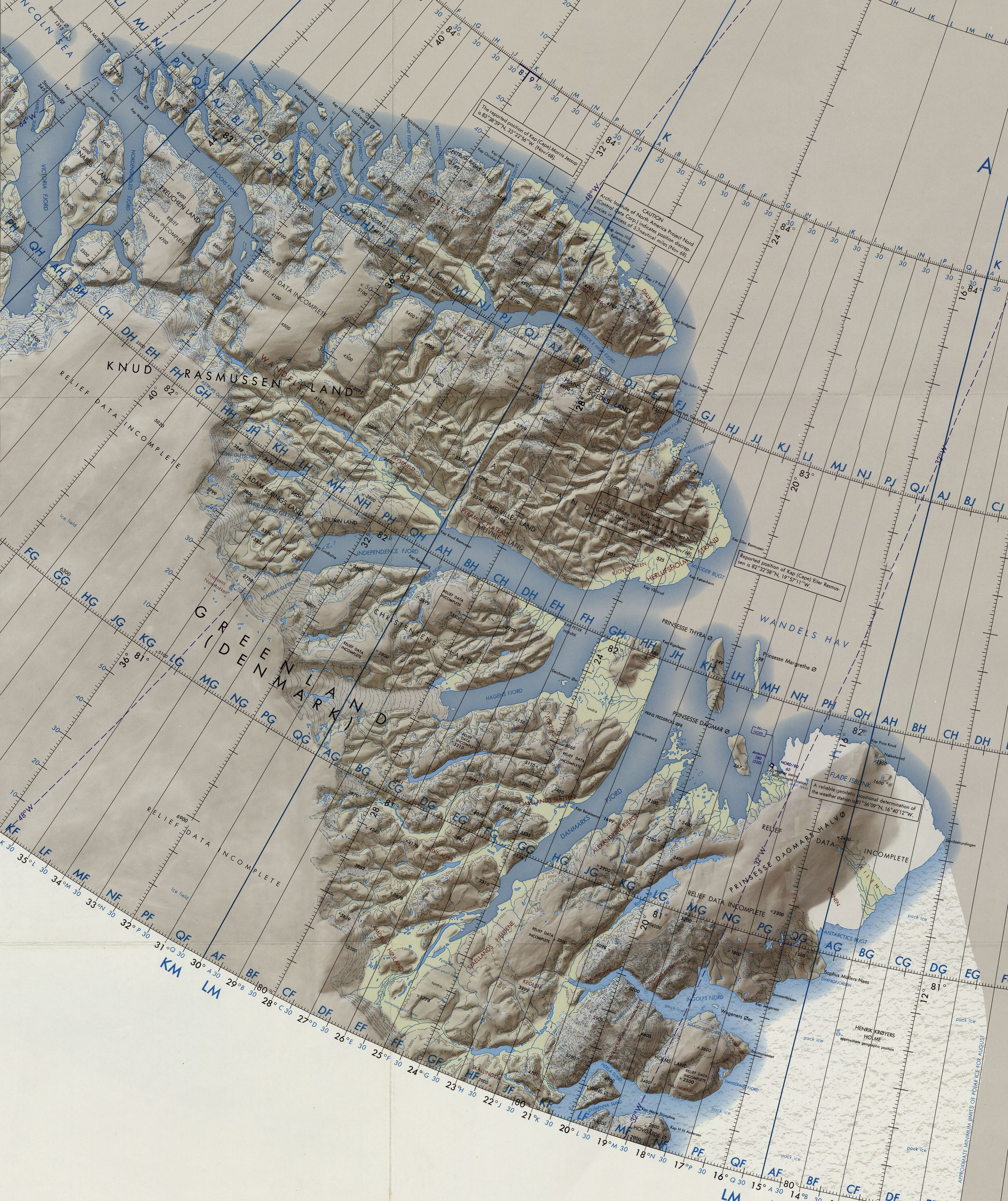
Map of Northeastern Greenland

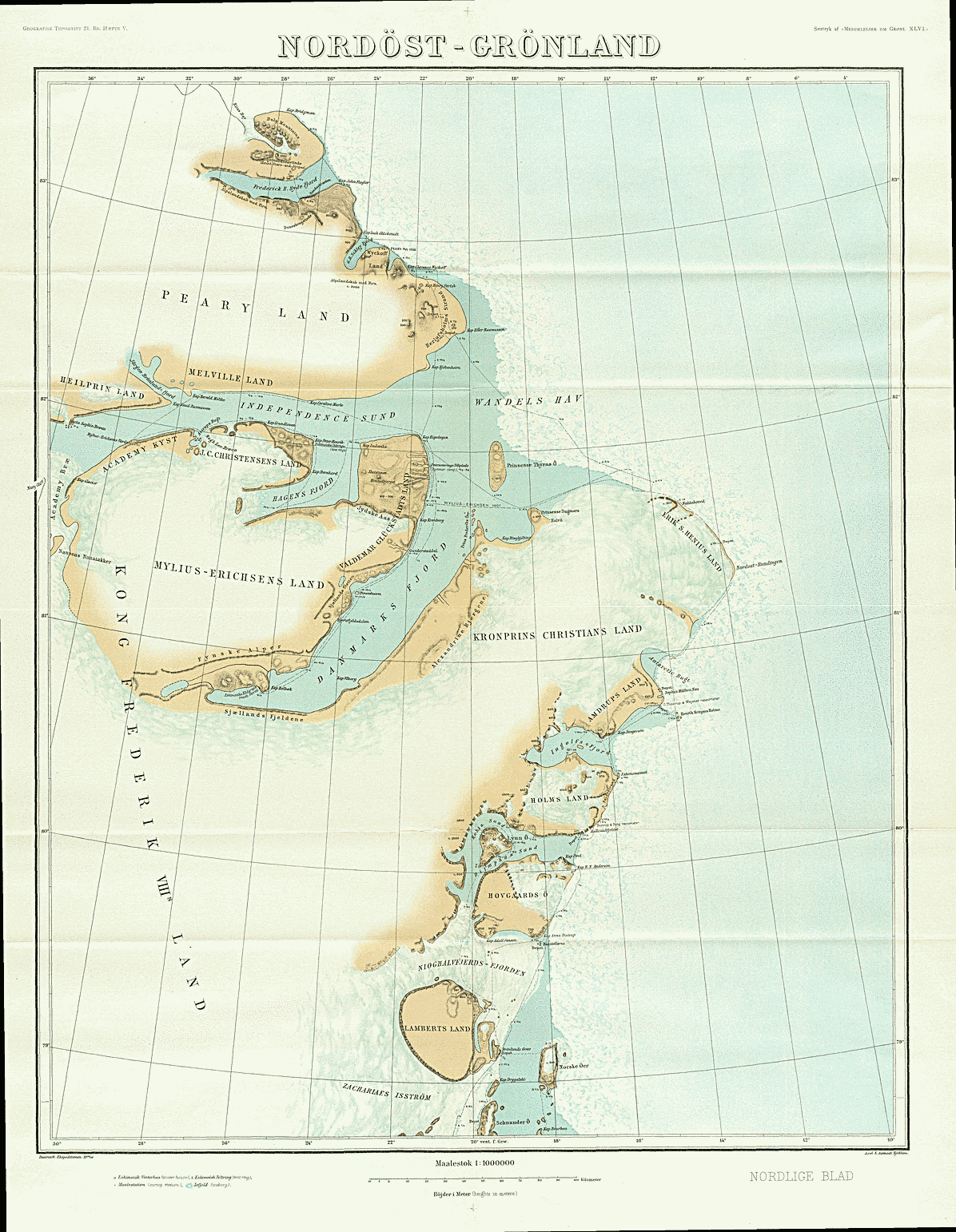
1911 German map of NE Greenland showing Ingolf Fjord

== See also ==
- List of fjords of Greenland
