= Princess Elizabeth Alps =

Mountain range in Greenland

- Prinsesse Elisabeth Alper
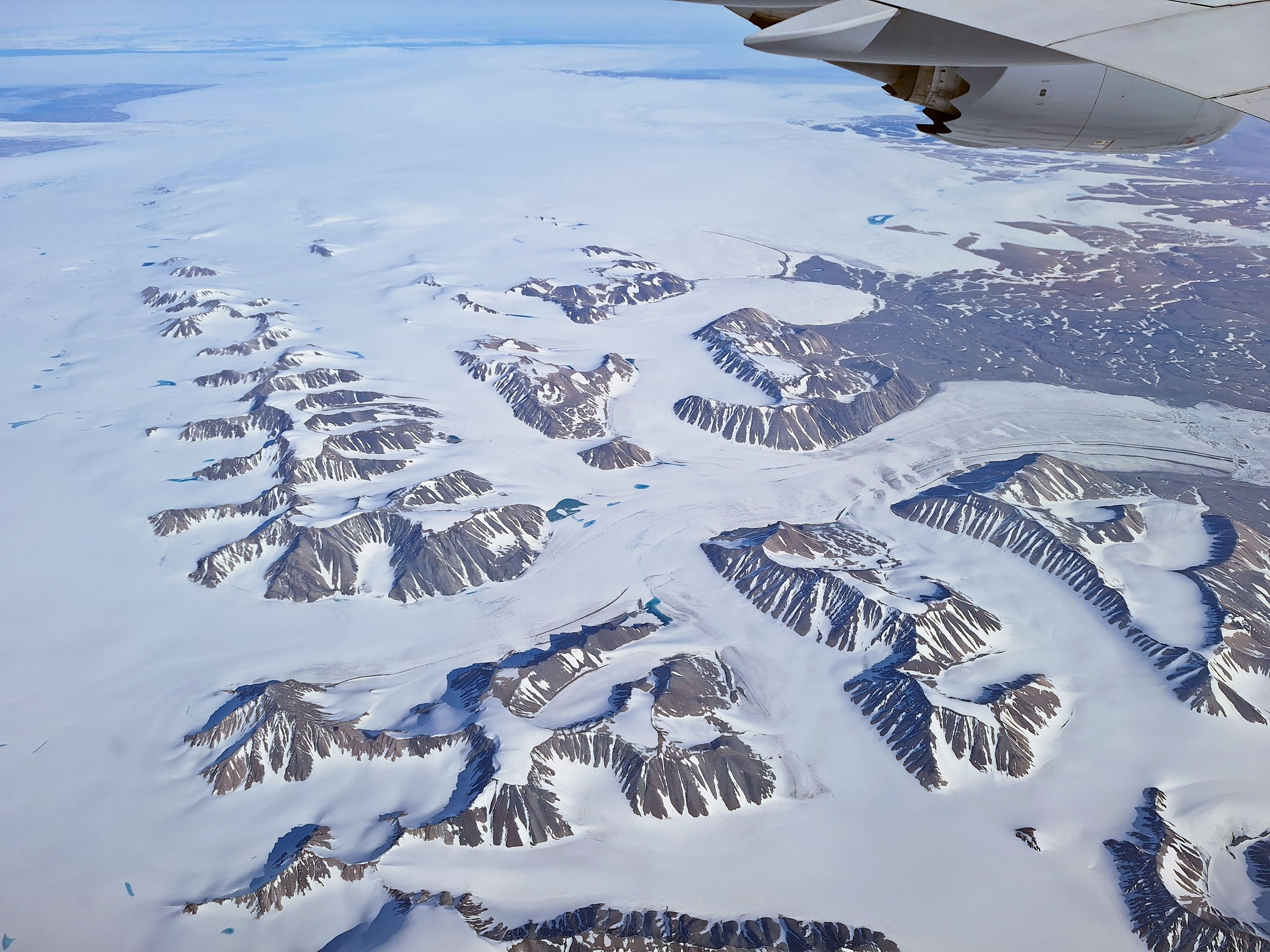
- Aerial photo in July 2026, looking northeast

Highest point
- Elevation: 1,466.4 m (4,811 ft)

Dimensions
- Length: 50 km (31 mi) NNE/SSW
- Width: 27 km (17 mi) ESE/WSW

Geography
- Location within Greenland
- Country: Greenland
- Range coordinates: 80°48′N 18°48′W

Geology
- Rock age: Caledonian orogeny
- Rock type: Fold belt gneiss

The Princess Elizabeth Alps (Danish: Prinsesse Elisabeth Alper) is a mountain range in King Frederick VIII Land, northeastern Greenland. Administratively this range is part of the Northeast Greenland National Park zone.

The range was named by Eigil Nielsen during the 1938–39 Mørkefjord Expedition after Princess Elisabeth of Denmark (1935–2018), daughter of Prince Knud.

== Geography ==
The Princess Elizabeth Alps run roughly from north to south across the western half of the large Crown Prince Christian Land peninsula with an average elevation of 1,058 m (3,471 ft).

The range begins abruptly at the Ingolf Fjord in the south, with the mountains rising steeply from the shore. Towards the northern end the elevations decrease until the range becomes a chain of small nunataks barely rising above the surrounding ice sheet.

The area of the range is bounded in the north by the Flade Isblink, a massive ice sheet, to the west by the Nunataami Elv valley, to the south by the Ingolf Fjord, and to the east by the Tobias Glacier, beyond which lies Amdrup Land. The Princess Caroline-Mathilde Alps located to the south in Holm Land across the fjord display a similar structure.

The Princess Elizabeth Alps lie in a desolate and uninhabited part of Greenland. The nearest settlement is Nord, a military outpost with an airfield located about 60 km to the NNE of the northern end.

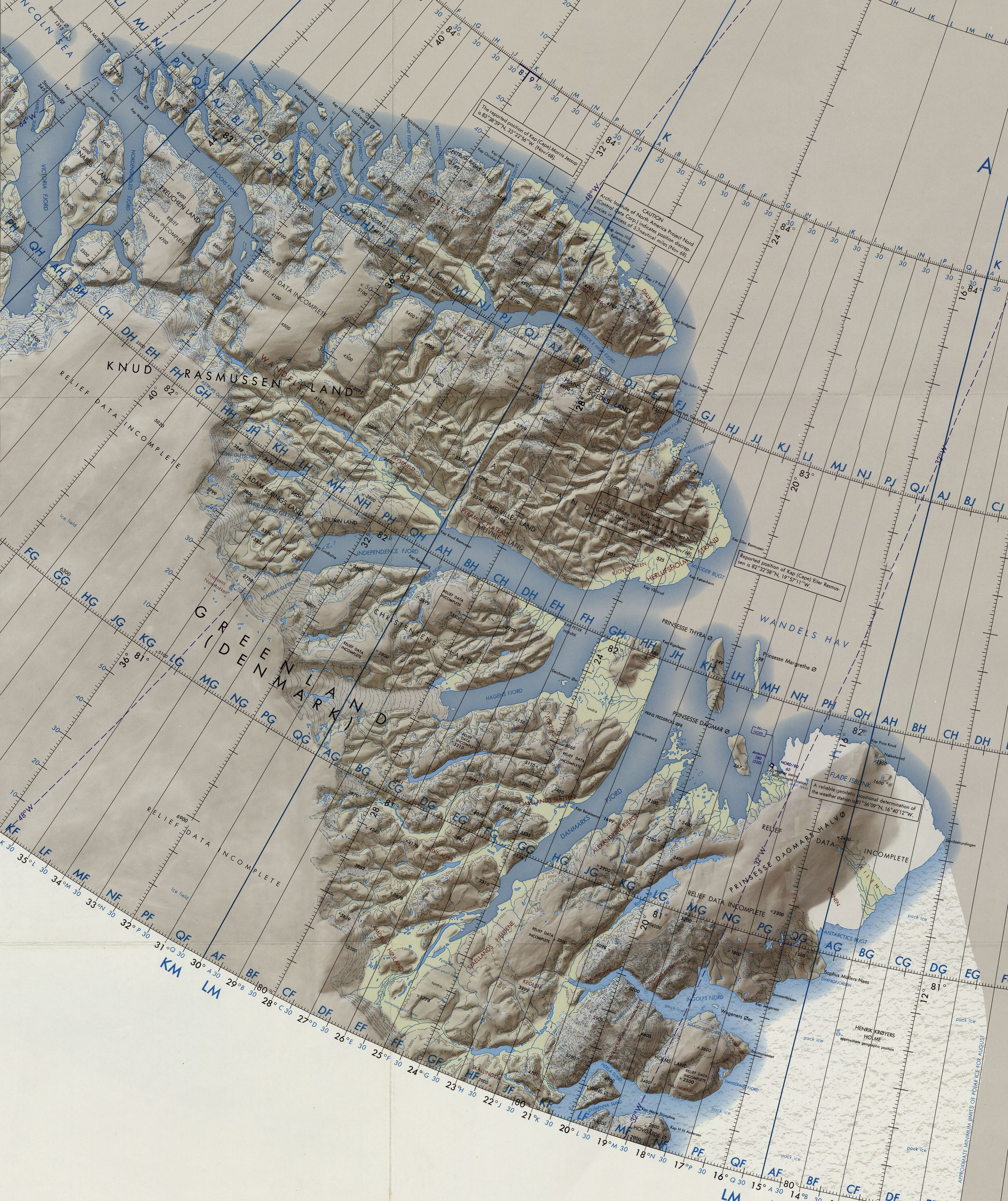
Operational Navigation Chart of NE Greenland.

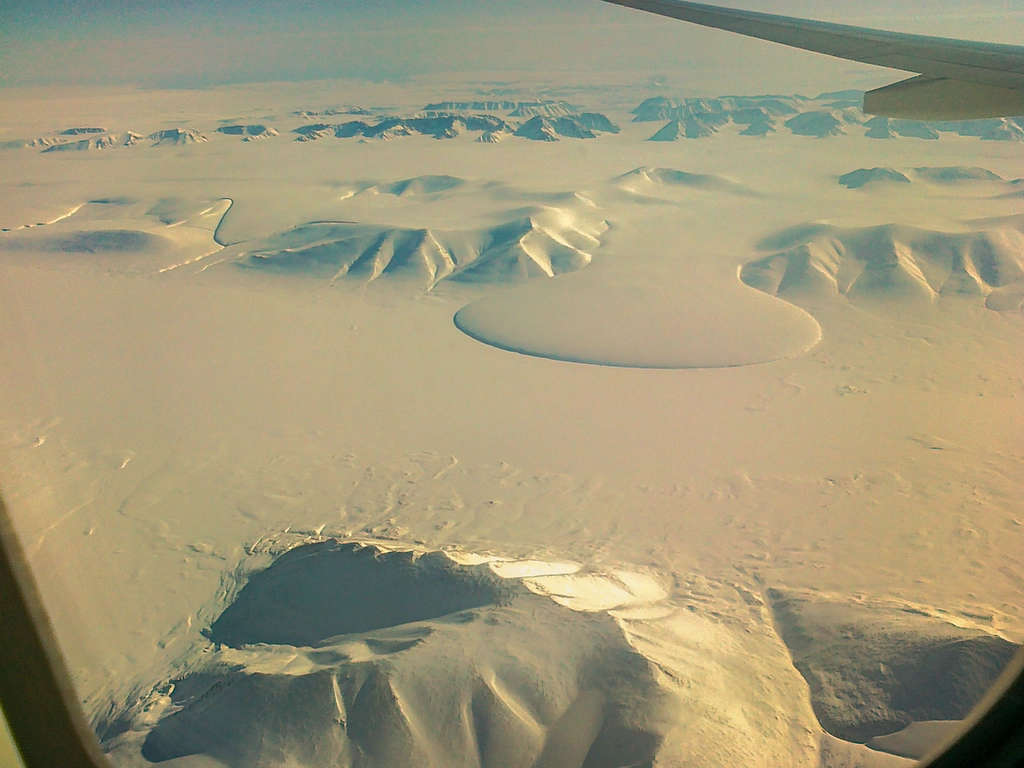
View of the Elephant foot Glacier at Romer Lake with the Princess Elizabeth Alps in the background

=== Mountains and glaciers ===
The range is an up to 1,466.4 m (4,811 ft) high largely glaciated mountain massif. The main summits are:

- HP (1,466 m); highest peak at 80°44′17″N 18°47′46″W
- Peak (1,446 m) at 80°40′11″N 19°5′3″W
- Peak (1,440.7 m) at 80°43′54″N 18°35′39″W
- Peak (1,422 m) at 80°45′50″N 18°44′36″W
- Peak (1,330 m) at 80°44′48″N 18°10′41″W
- Peak (1,327.7 m) at 80°42′4″N 18°14′14″W
- Peak (1,326.8 m) at 80°48′40″N 18°30′52″W
- Peak (1,313 m) at 80°50′34″N 18°19′20″W

The Bjørne Glacier runs southwards, draining the area of the Princess Elisabeth Alps. Other important glaciers in the range are the Smalle Spaerre Glacier and the Hjørne Glacier.

== Climate ==
The Princess Elizabeth Alps lie in the high Arctic zone. Tundra climate prevails in the area of the range, the average annual temperature in the area being -16 °C . The warmest month is July when the average temperature rises to 0 °C and the coldest is January with -26 °C.

== See also ==
- List of mountain ranges of Greenland
