= Princess Thyra Island =

Uninhabited island off the coast of northern Greenland

Native name: Prinsesse Thyra Ø
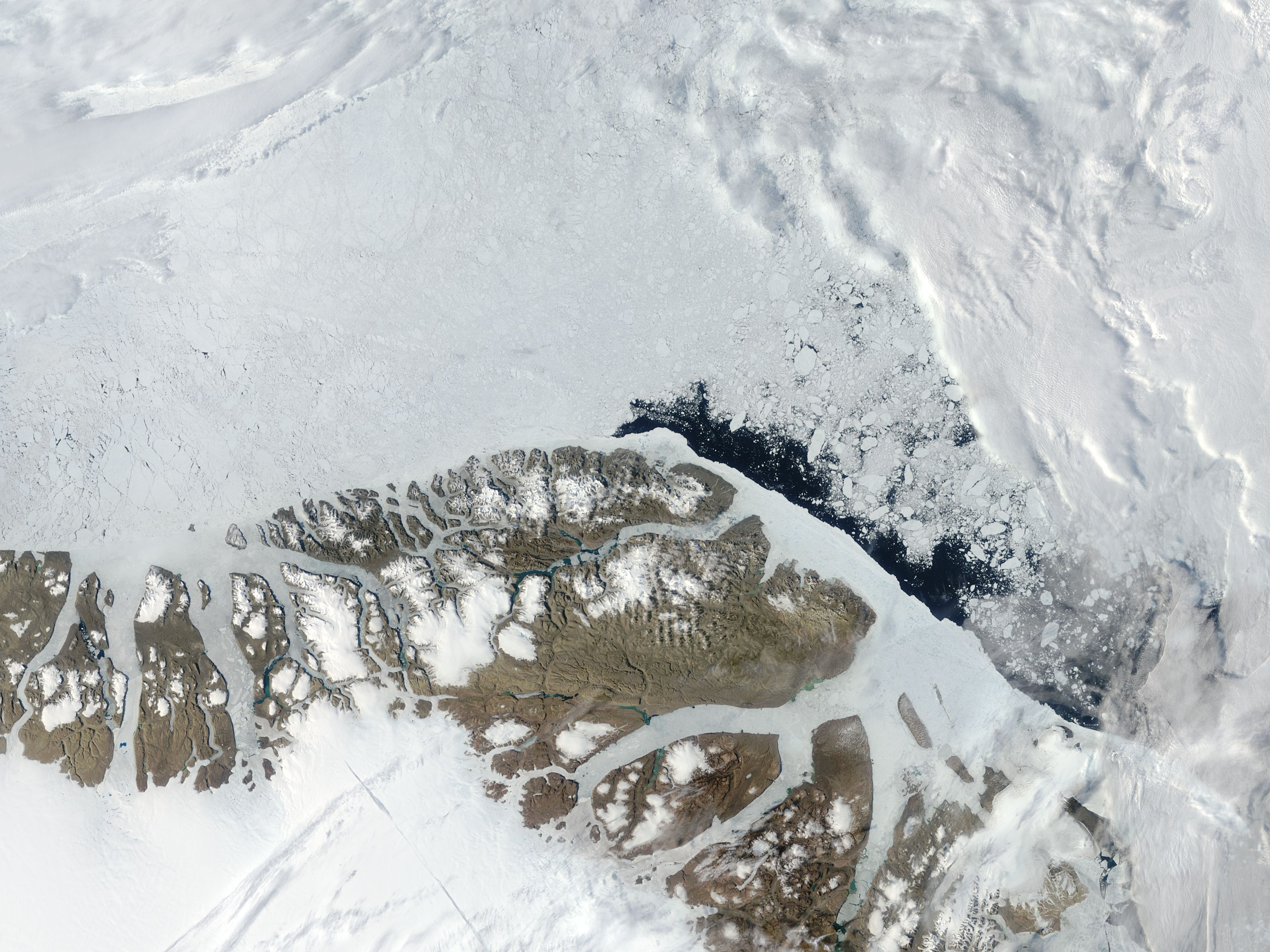
- Satellite image of the northern end of Greenland including Princess Thyra Island

- Location of Princess Thyra Island in Greenland
- Interactive map of Princess Thyra Island
- Etymology: named after Princess Thyra of Denmark

Geography
- Coordinates: 82°0′N 19°15′W
- Adjacent to: Wandel Sea
- Area: 313 km^{2} (121 sq mi)
- Area rank: 22nt largest in Greenland
- Length: 36 km (22.4 mi)
- Width: 28 km (17.4 mi)
- Highest elevation: 76 m (249 ft)

Administration
- Greenland
- Unincorporated area: Northeast Greenland National Park

Demographics
- Population: 0 (2022)
- Pop. density: 0/km^{2} (0/sq mi)
- Ethnic groups: none

Princess Thyra Island (Danish: Prinsesse Thyra Ø) is an uninhabited island of the Wandel Sea, Greenland. The island is within King Frederick VIII Land in the Northeast Greenland National Park. The island was named after Princess Thyra of Denmark.

== Geography ==
This island is located east of Princess Margaret Island, to the northwest of Princess Dagmar Island close to the coast of far northeastern Greenland, in a bay of the Wandel Sea at the confluence of Denmark Sound and Independence Sound.

The island has an area of 313 km ² and a shoreline of 85.7 kilometres. It was formerly part of Avannaa, originally Nordgrønland ("North Greenland"), one of the counties of Greenland until 31 December 2008.

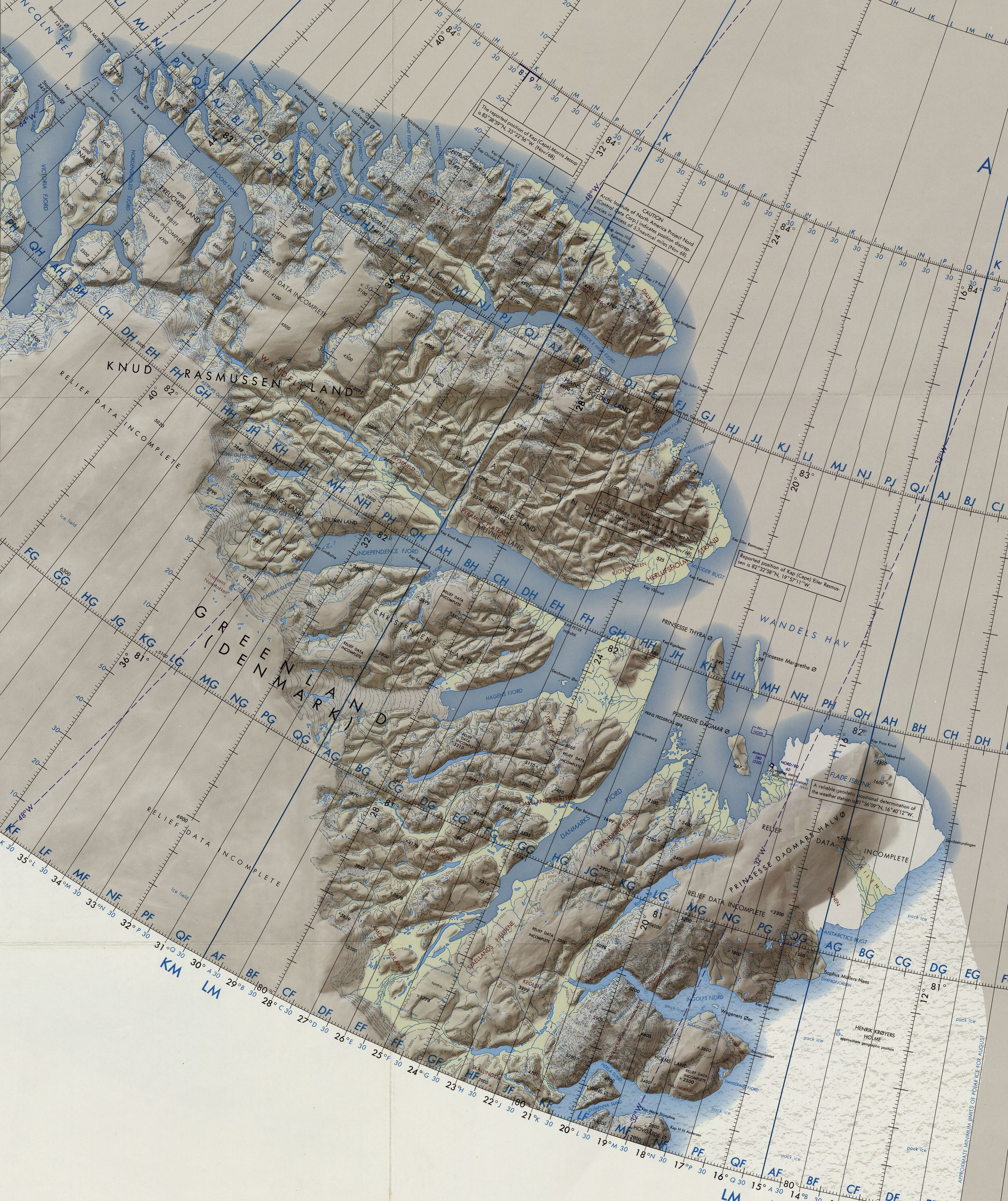
Map of Far Northeastern Greenland.

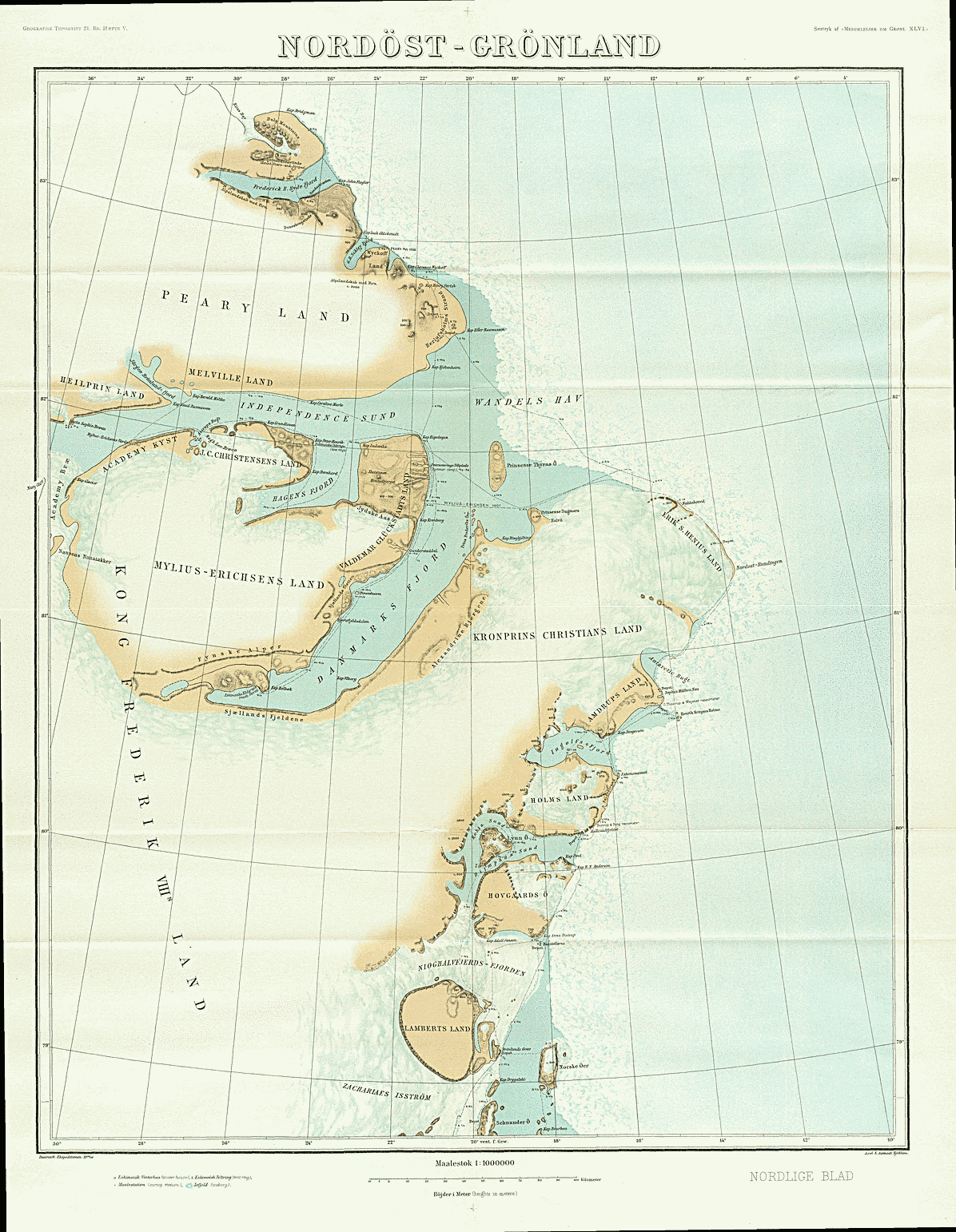
1911 map of NE Greenland showing Princess Thyra Island, but not Princess Dagmar Island.

== See also ==
- List of islands of Greenland
