= Princess Margaret Island =

Island in Greenland

Prinsesse Margrethe Ø
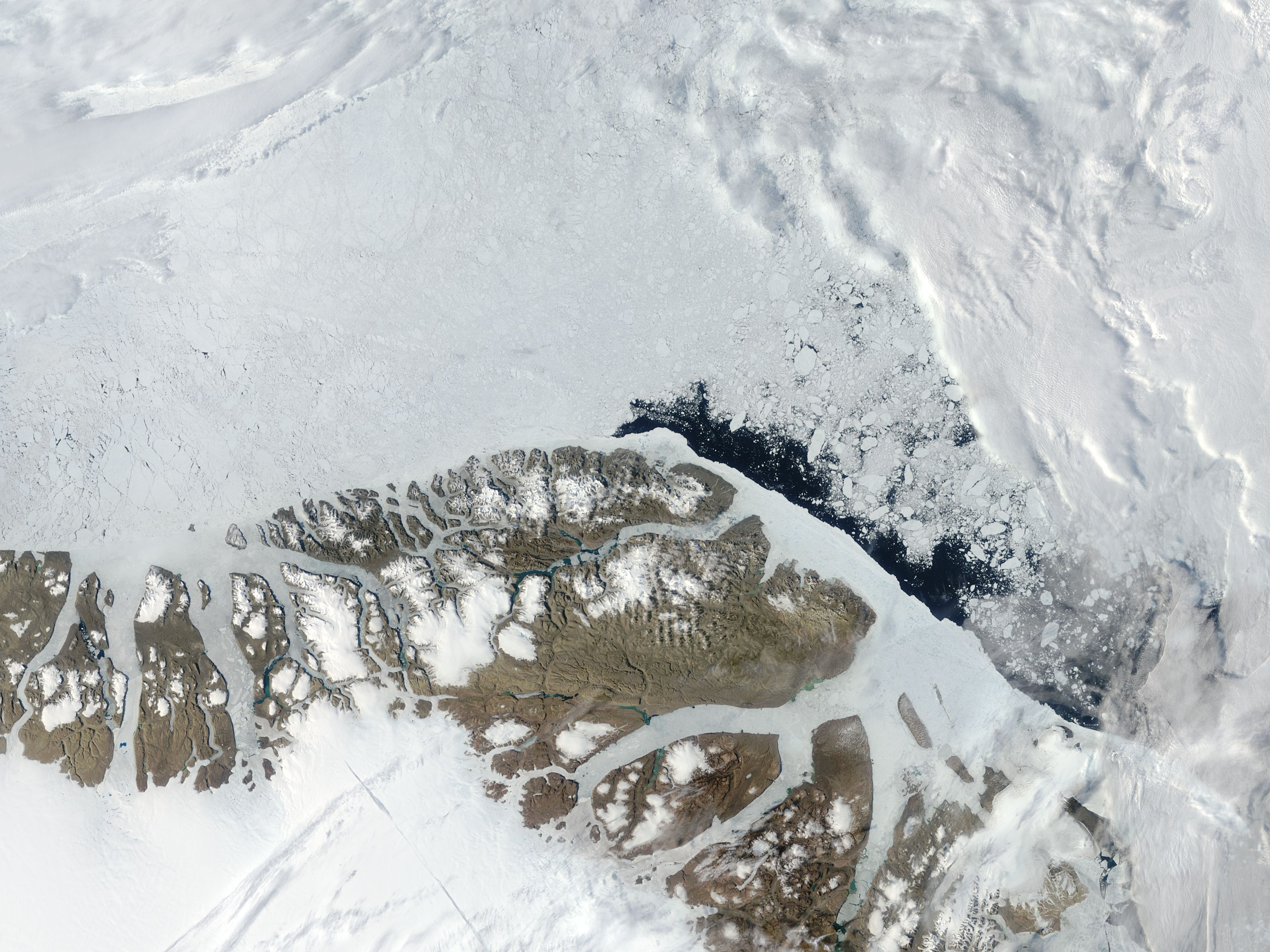
- Satellite image of The northern end of Greenland including Princess Margaret Island

- Location within Greenland

Geography
- Location: Wandel Sea
- Coordinates: 82°1′N 20°17′W
- Length: 20 km (12 mi)
- Width: 1.5 km (0.93 mi)
- Highest elevation: 29.8 m (97.8 ft)

Administration
- Denmark
- Zone: NE Greenland National Park

Demographics
- Population: 0

Princess Margaret Island (Danish: Prinsesse Margrethe Ø) is an uninhabited island of the Wandel Sea, Greenland. The island is within King Frederick VIII Land in the Northeast Greenland National Park. The island was named after Princess Margaret of Denmark.

== Geography ==
This island is by far the smallest of the group formed by Princess Thyra Island to the west and Princess Dagmar Island to the south in the Wandel Sea at the confluence of Denmark Sound and Independence Sound.

Princess Margaret Island lies 13 km to the east of larger Princess Thyra Island. It is long and narrow, its southern half being merely a long spit.

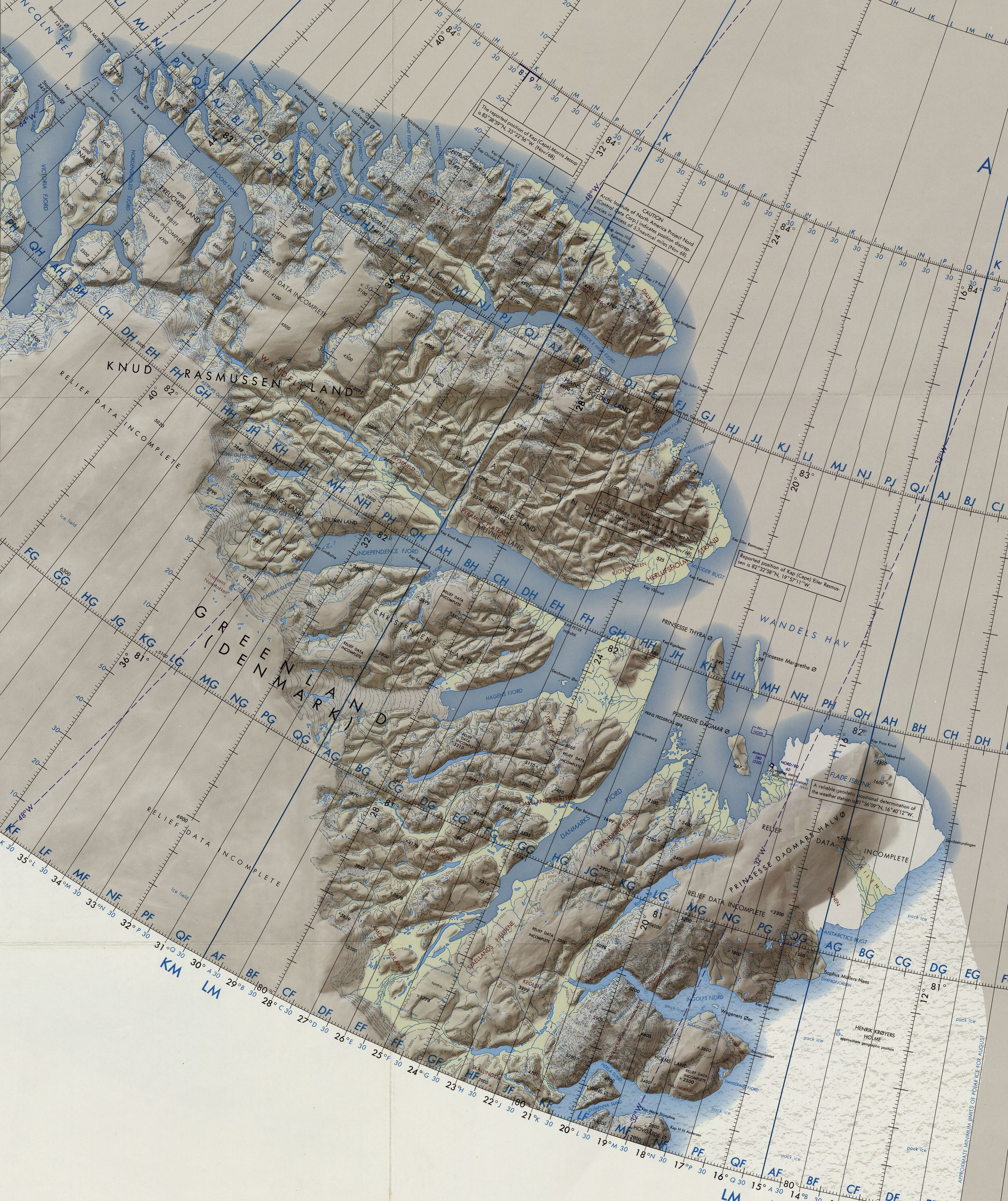
Map of Far Northeastern Greenland.

== See also ==
- List of islands of Greenland
