= Princess Caroline-Mathilde Alps =

Mountain range in Greenland

- Prinsesse Caroline Mathilde Alper
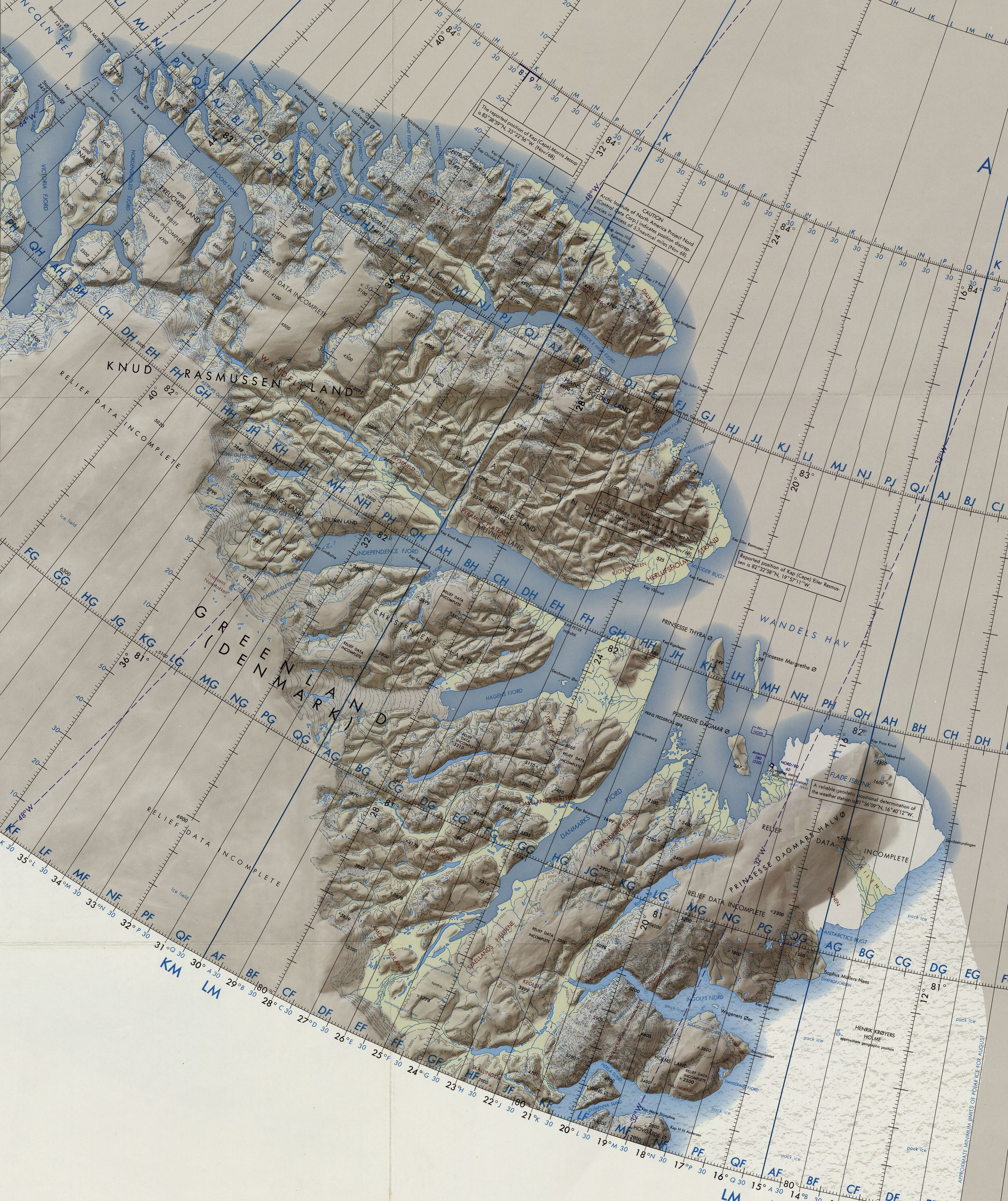
- Operational Navigation Chart of NE Greenland.

Highest point
- Peak: Holm Land HP
- Elevation: 1,627 m (5,338 ft)

Dimensions
- Length: 55 km (34 mi) N/S
- Width: 30 km (19 mi) E/W
- Area: 1,400 km^{2} (540 mi^{2})

Geography
- Location within Greenland
- Country: Greenland
- Range coordinates: 80°22′N 19°10′W

The Princess Caroline-Mathilde Alps (Danish: Prinsesse Caroline Mathilde Alper) are a mountain range system in the Holm Land Peninsula, King Frederick VIII Land, northeastern Greenland. Administratively this range is part of the Northeast Greenland National Park zone.

The range was named by the 1938–39 Mørkefjord Expedition after Princess Caroline-Mathilde of Denmark (1912-1995), wife of Prince Knud of Denmark (1900-1976), patron of the expedition.

== Geography ==
The Princess Caroline-Mathilde Alps run from north to south across the western half of the Holm Land peninsula. The Princess Elizabeth Alps located to the north across the Ingolf Fjord display a similar structure. The range is bound to the north and northwest by the inner Ingolf Fjord, to the east by the flatter eastern part of Holm Land, to the west by the Vandre Valley (Vandredalen) and the Saefaxi River (Sæfaxi Elv), and to the south by the Marmorvigen and the inner Hekla Sound, the NW branch of the Dijmphna Sound.

The range has numerous rocky peaks and ridges that are unnamed. The highest point of the Princess Caroline-Mathilde Alps reaches 1,627 m (5,338 ft) at 80°28′28″N 19°36′38″W with an almost as high 1,618 m (5,308 ft) peak located very close about 5 km to the southeast. US Air Force maps display the same highest point reaching 1,801 m (5,909 ft) and other sources 1,744 m (5,722 ft).

The Princess Caroline-Mathilde Alps lie in a desolate and uninhabited part of Greenland. The nearest settlement is Nord, a military outpost with an airfield located about 120 km to the north.

=== Glaciers ===
The main glaciers in the Princess Caroline-Mathilde Alps are:

- Gaflen Glacier, on the western side.
- Skeen Glacier, on the western side.
- Spaerre Brae (Brede Spærregletscher), a large glacier on the northern side.
- Tungen Glacier, on the western side.

== Climate ==
The Princess Caroline-Mathilde Alps lie in the high Arctic zone. Polar climate prevails in the area of the range, the average annual temperature in the area being -16 °C . The warmest month is July when the average temperature rises to -1 °C and the coldest is January with -28 °C.

== Bibliography ==
- A. K. Higgins, M. P. Smith, N. J. Soper, A. G. Leslie, J. A. Rasmussen and M. Sønderholm 2000: The Neoproterozoic Hekla Sund Basin, eastern North Greenland: a pre-Iapetan extensional sequence thrust across its rift shoulders during the Caledonian orogeny. The Geological Society of London. 2001.
- Pedersen, S. A. S., Leslie, A. G. & Craig, L. E. 1995. Proterozoic and Caledonian geology of the Prinsesse Caroline Mathilde Alper, eastern North Greenland. In: Higgins, A. K. (ed.) Express Report Eastern North and North-East Greenland 1995. Geological Survey of Denmark and Greenland (GEUS), Copenhagen, 71–86.

== See also ==
- List of mountain ranges of Greenland
