= Centrum Lake =

- Centrumsø
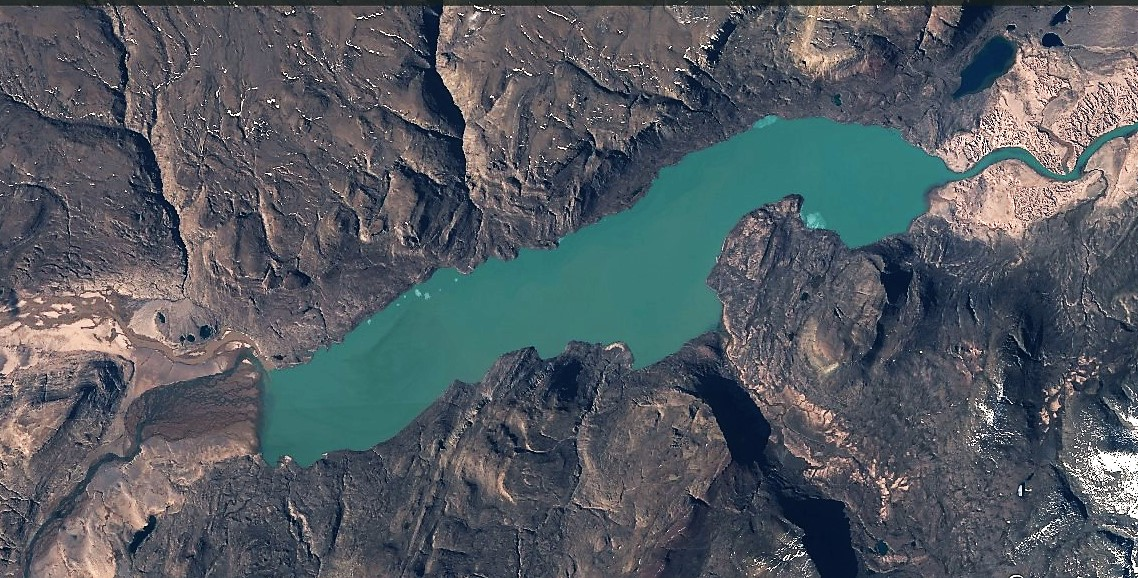
- Centrum Lake Sentinel-2 image

- Location in Greenland
- Location: NE Greenland
- Coordinates: 80°10′N 22°30′W
- Type: Lake
- Ocean/sea sources: Sæfaxi Elv, Hekla Sound, Greenland Sea
- Basin countries: Greenland, Denmark
- Max. length: 18 km (11 mi)
- Max. width: 3 km (1.9 mi)

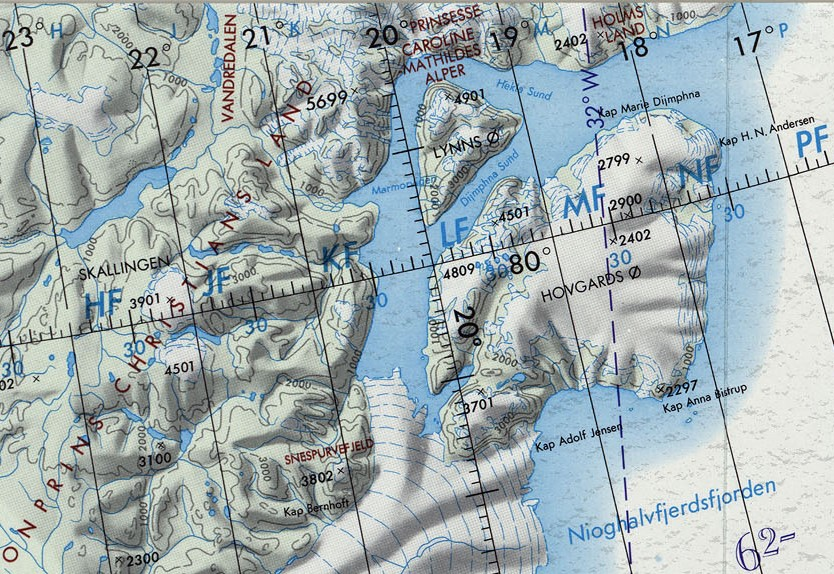
Operational Navigation Chart of NE Greenland map section with Centrum lake in the upper left.

Centrum Lake (Danish: Centrumsø, also known as Centrum Sø), is a lake in King Frederick VIII Land, near Greenland's northeastern coast. The lake and its surroundings are part of the Northeast Greenland National Park zone.

The Danish military base/weather station Nord —the only inhabited place in the area— lies about 200 km (120 mi) to the NNE.

== History ==
The lake was first observed by Lauge Koch in 1938 during an aerial survey. It was named in 1952-53 when it was chosen as a center for geological research in which Catalina planes could land. Huts were built and scientific personnel used the location as a base for research in the area, as well as to launch expeditions further north.

In 1955 it was considered as a possible site for a military base in Greenland. Currently there is a STOL airstrip near the lake.

== Geography ==
Centrum Lake is a land-locked freshwater lake with a fjord structure. It is located at the southern end of Crown Prince Christian Land peninsula. The Sæfaxi Elv, a short river, discharges its waters eastwards in the Marmorvigen, a small branch in the western shore of the Hekla Sound, a little to the north of the confluence with the Dijmphna Sound. The surface of the lake is usually free of ice in July and August, although there are years in which the ice doesn't totally melt.

Sydhøjen is a small peninsula on the northern side of the lake which has Inuit archaeological remains. There are also caves in the area of the lake.

== Bibliography ==
- Needleman, S.M. (ed.) 1962: Arctic earth science investigations, Centrum Sø, northeast Greenland, 1960. Air Force Surveys Geo physics 138, 132 pp.

== See also ==
- List of fjords of Greenland
- List of research stations in the Arctic
