= Operation Northern Falcon =

Ukrainian–Danish fuel transportation operation in Greenland

- Location: Greenland
- Planned by: Ukrainian Air Force
- Objective: transportation of fuel
- Date: 12 January 2009 – present

Operation Northern Falcon (Ukrainian: Операція «Північний сокіл») is a joint Ukrainian–Danish operation in Greenland for the transportation of fuel from the United States Air Force's Thule Air Base to the Danish Station Nord by the military transport aircraft Ilyushin Il-76MD of the Ukrainian Air Force. It has been conducted annually since 2009.

== History ==
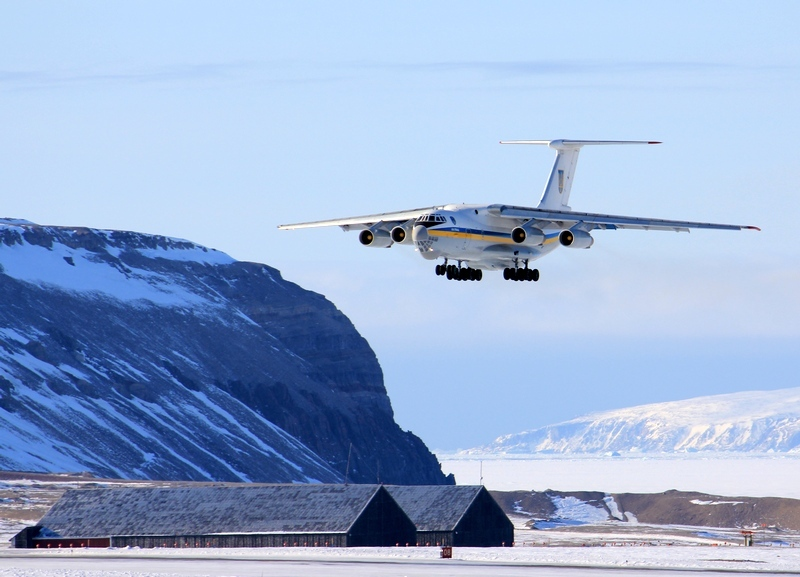
Ukrainian Air Force Il-76MD at Thule Air Base in 2013

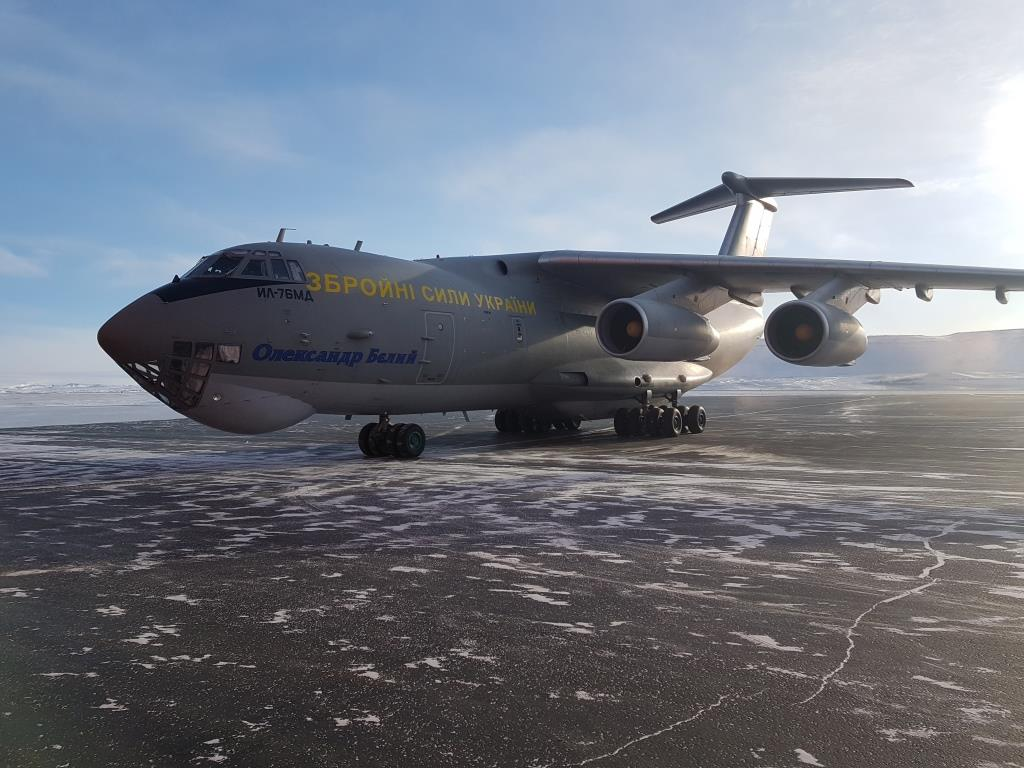
Il-76MD from the 25th Transport Aviation Brigade at Thule Air Base

The operation has been conducted for ten years in a row as part of the memorandum of understanding between the Ukrainian and Danish defence ministries.

Operation Northern Falcon 2011 involved 29 Ukrainian servicemen. Vadym Yeroshkin was a crew commander. Also, the working group included officers-coordinators of the Ukrainian Air Force Command. In 2013, 29 service members were deployed, including two flight crews from the 25th Transport Aviation Brigade of Melitopol led by commanders Lieutenant Colonels Yeroshkin and Volodymyr Buhalskyi as well as Colonel Serhiy Artemenko and Major Oleksandr Bilyi, as well as flight instructors and coordinating officers.

On 14 March 2019, Operation Northern Falcon 2019 on fuel transportation to the island of Greenland began and lasted until April that year. In the framework of the operation, a group of Ukrainian aviators, with Colonel Serhii Artemenko as a Detachment Commander, has left Ukraine from the military platform of Boryspil International Airport to the Kingdom of Denmark by the aircraft Il-76MD. In general, 23 Ukrainian servicemen were involved in the operation. After arriving at Aalborg Air Base of the Royal Danish Air Force, the aircraft Il-76MD of the Ukrainian Air Force went to the island of Greenland. It was planned to transport 700 thousand liters of fuel and other cargo from the United States Air Force's Thule Air Base to the Danish Station Nord.

In Greenland, Ukrainian military pilots perform tasks in difficult Arctic climatic conditions: −50 °C air temperature, wind speed of 15–20 metres per second and without ground-based radio navigation equipment and spare airfields.

== See also ==
- Denmark–Ukraine relations
