= Danmark Fjord =

Fjord in Greenland

- Denmark Sound
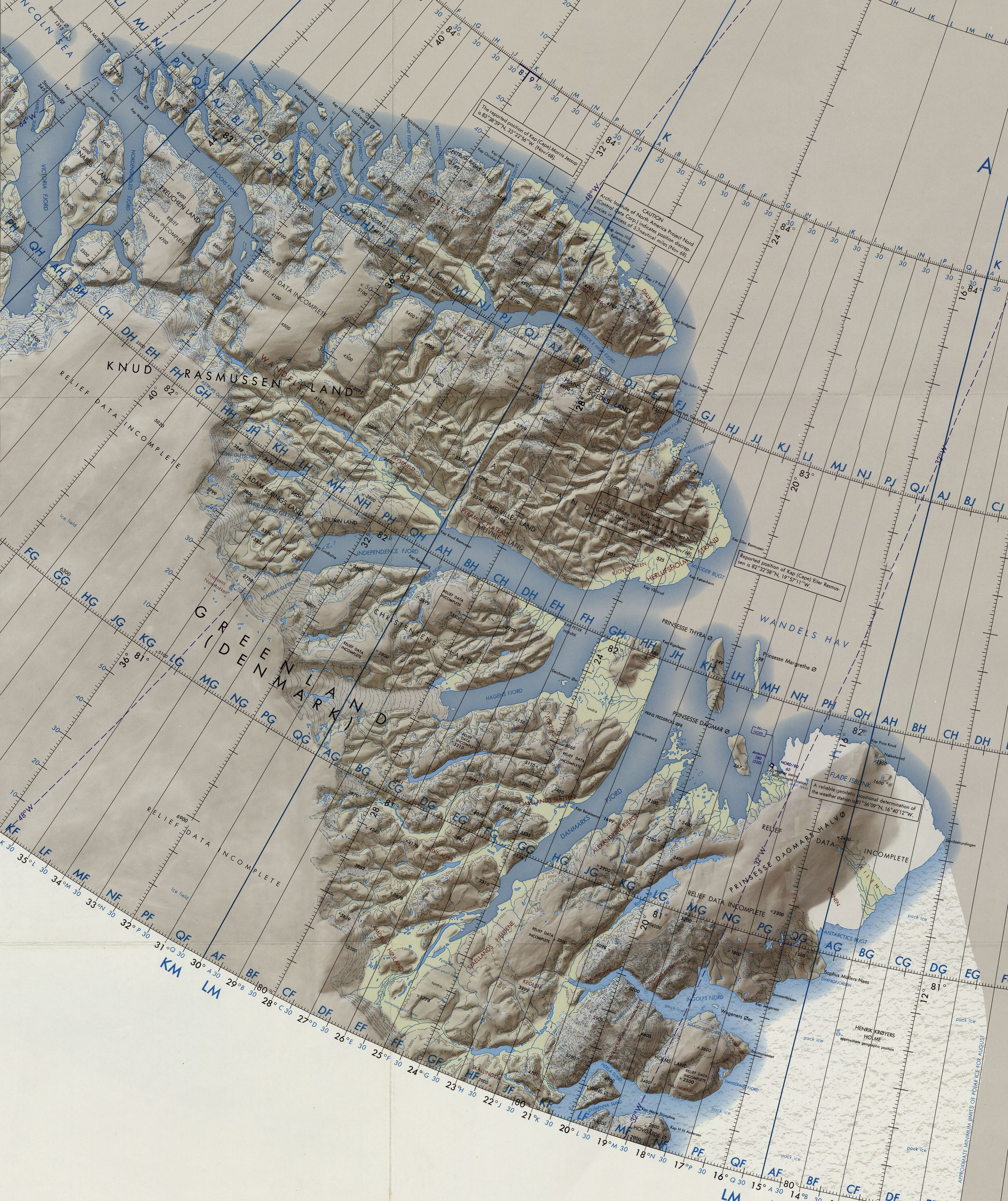
- Map of Northeastern Greenland

- Location in Greenland
- Location: Arctic
- Coordinates: 81°40′N 26°20′W
- Ocean/sea sources: Wandel Sea
- Basin countries: Greenland
- Frozen: Practically all year round

Danmark Fjord (Danish: Danmarksfjorden), also known as Denmark Sound, is a fjord in northeast Greenland. Administratively it belongs to the Northeast Greenland National Park.

The fjord was explored and named after the expedition ship Danmark at the time of the ill-fated Denmark expedition 1906-1908 led by Ludvig Mylius-Erichsen, which mapped Greenland's northeastern coast between Cape Bridgman and Cape Bismarck.

== History ==
In May 1907 Mylius-Erichsen entered the unknown Danmark Fjord with his three-dogsled exploration team, deeming it would be leading him to the Navy Cliff and the postulated Peary Channel, which in fact did not exist. The team, which included cartographer Niels Peter Høeg Hagen and dogsled expert Jørgen Brønlund, travelled southwestwards until the head of the fjord and, becoming aware that it was a dead end, they backtracked to the northeast.

By the end of May Mylius-Erichsen's team was back again at the mouth of the fjord. As they met Johan Peter Koch's northern team at Cape Rigsdagen, already on their way back from Cape Bridgman, Mylius-Erichsen realized that they had wasted precious time and provisions by entering the long unexplored fjord. The delay would eventually lead the three men to their death as they pressed westward along the southern shore of Independence Fjord instead of returning to the ship.

== Geography ==
This fjord, together with Independence Fjord has its mouth in the Wandel Sea, which is part of the Arctic Ocean. Three islands are located in the bay at the mouth of the sound, Princess Thyra Island, Princess Margaret Island and Princess Dagmar Island. The area was formerly part of Avannaa, originally Nordgrønland ("North Greenland"), a former county of Greenland until 31 December 2008.

The Danish military base and weather station Nord is located by the sound on the western side of Crown Prince Christian Land, the peninsula on the eastern side. Mylius-Erichsen Land is the peninsula to the west. Unlike other fjords in the area, there is no large calving glacier at the head of the Danmark Fjord, but it is icebound the whole year round.

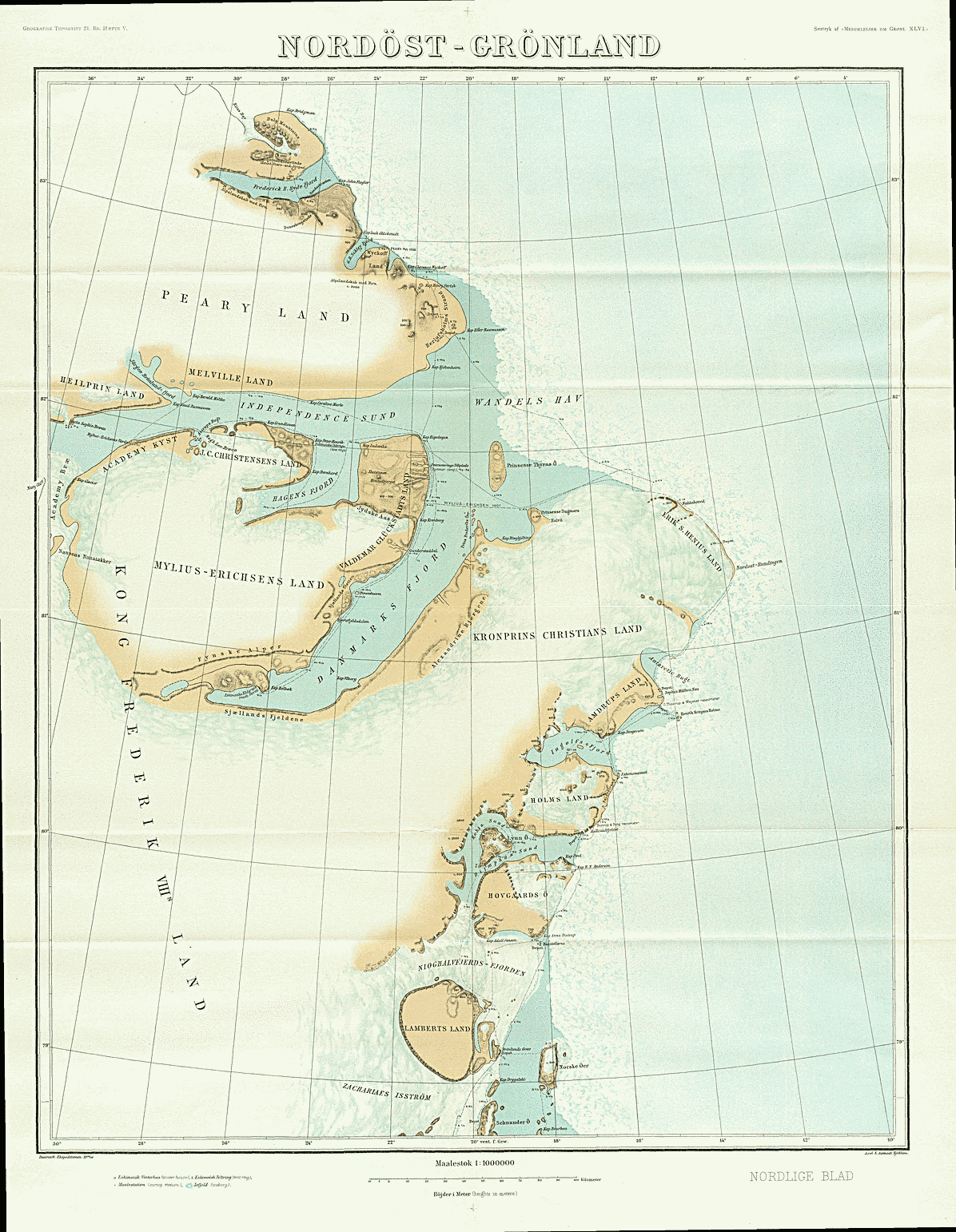
1911 German map of NE Greenland, showing the Denmark Fjord left of centre.

== See also ==
- List of fjords of Greenland
