= Crown Prince Christian Land =

Peninsula in Greenland

Kronprins Christian Land
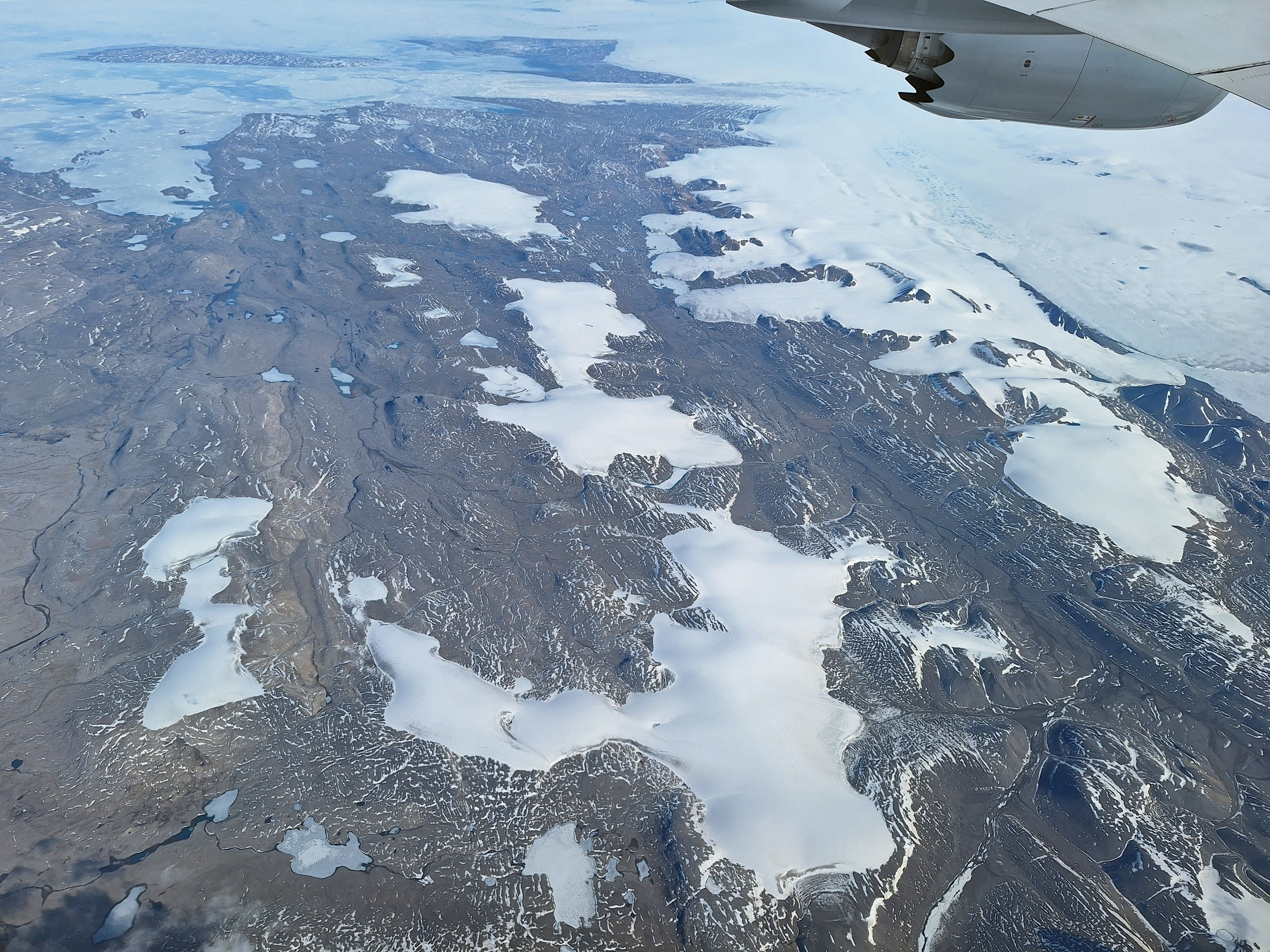
- Aerial photo in July 2026, looking northeast

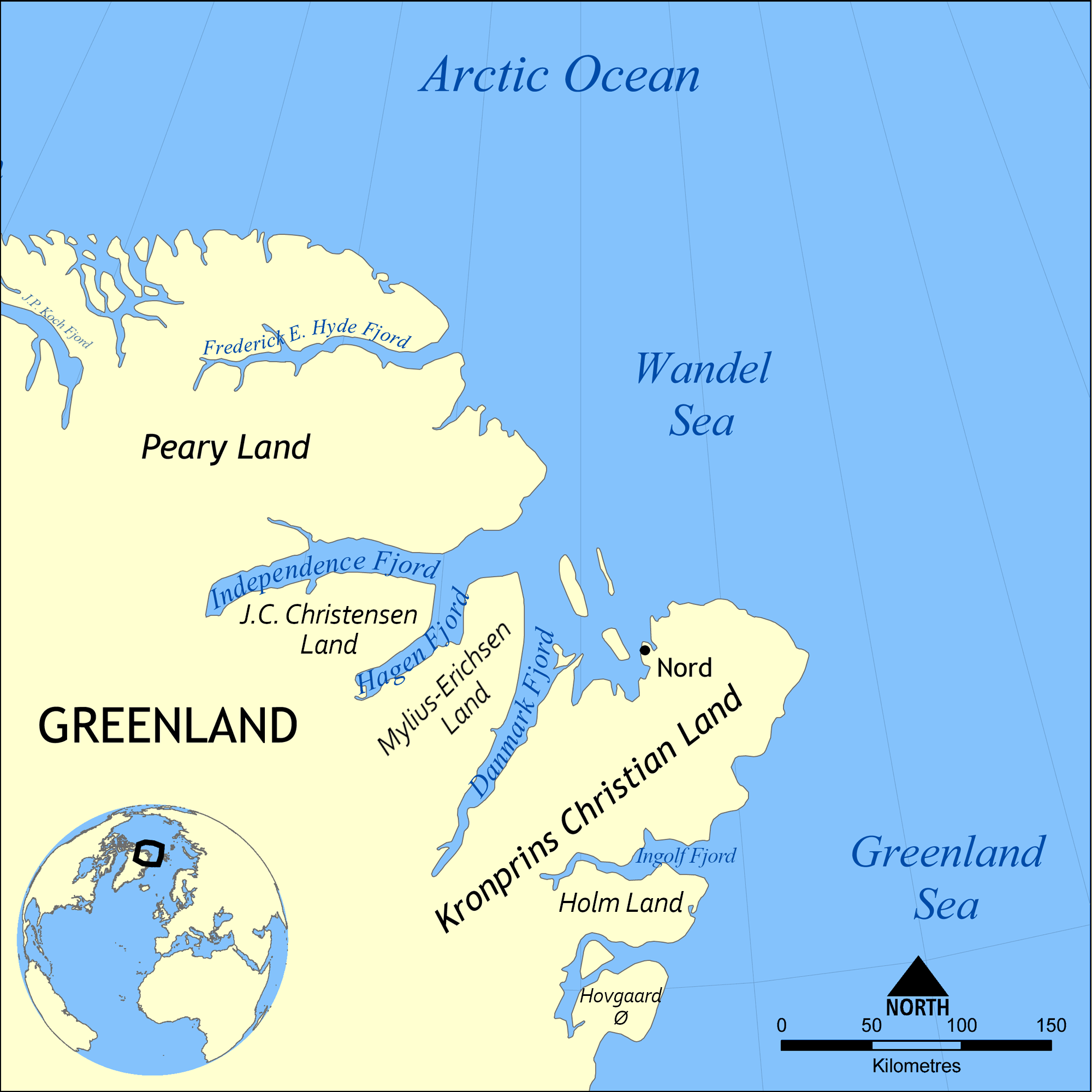
- Location of Crown Prince Christian Land

Geography
- Location: Far Northeast Greenland
- Coordinates: 80°52′N 18°45′W
- Adjacent to: Wandel Sea; Greenland Sea
- Length: 213 km (132.4 mi)
- Width: 115 km (71.5 mi)

Administration
- Greenland (Denmark)
- Zone: Northeast Greenland National Park

Crown Prince Christian Land (Danish: Kronprins Christian Land) is a large peninsula in northern Greenland. It is a part of King Frederick VIII Land and administratively it belongs to the Northeast Greenland National Park.

It was named after Crown Prince Christian, later Christian X of Denmark (1870–1947) by the 1906–08 Denmark expedition.

== Geography ==
Crown Prince Christian Land extends 100 km NE from Cape Jungersen. It is a largely glaciated peninsula surrounded to the north by the Wandel Sea of the Arctic Ocean, to the east by Fram Strait, to the south by the Ingolf Fjord and the Greenland Sea, with Antarctic Bay, and to the west by the Greenland Ice Sheet. The northern section of the peninsula is known as Erik S. Henius Land. In the northwest the smaller Princess Ingeborg Peninsula consists mostly of lowland. The southeastern part is mountainous and is known as Amdrup Land. The outer part of Crown Prince Christian Land is almost totally covered by the Flade Isblink ice cap.

Romer Lake, famous for its striking Elephant Foot Glacier, is a long and narrow lake running parallel to Denmark Fjord at the western end of the peninsula to the west of the Princess Elizabeth Alps. Centrum Lake lies at the southern end. Princess Dagmar Island lies off its northwestern shores. The Danish military base/weather station Nord is its only settlement.

Map of Kronprins Christian Land's northern half

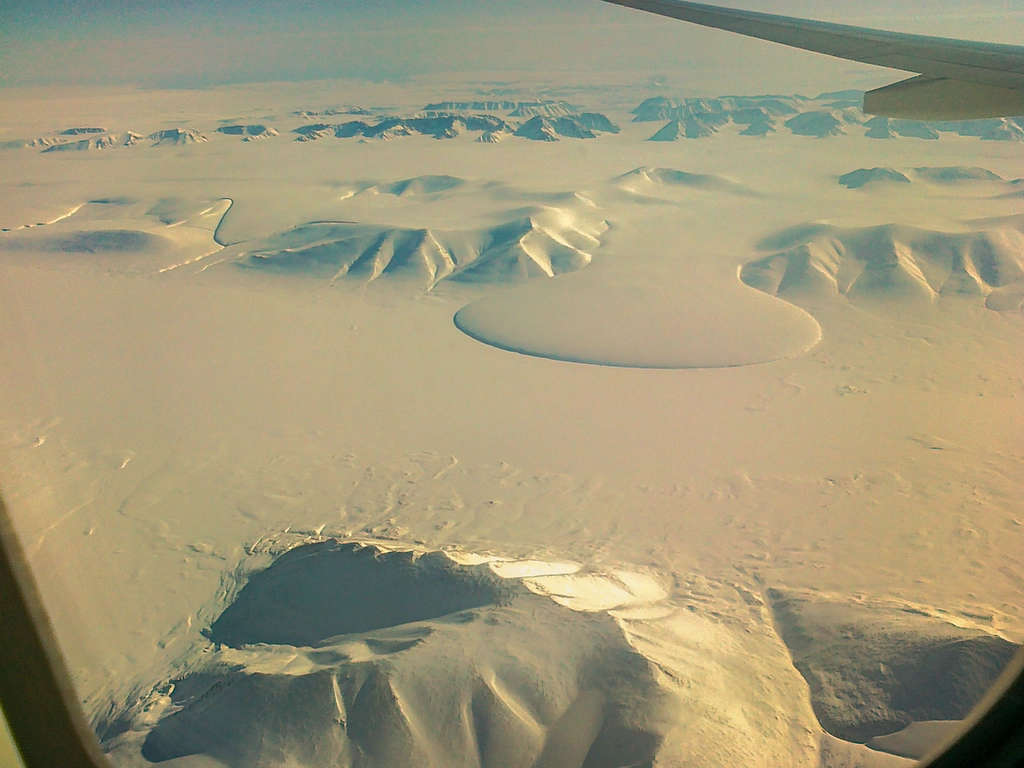
View of the Elephant Foot Glacier at Romer Lake
