= Avannaa =

Former county in Greenland

Coordinates: 79°00′N 50°00′W

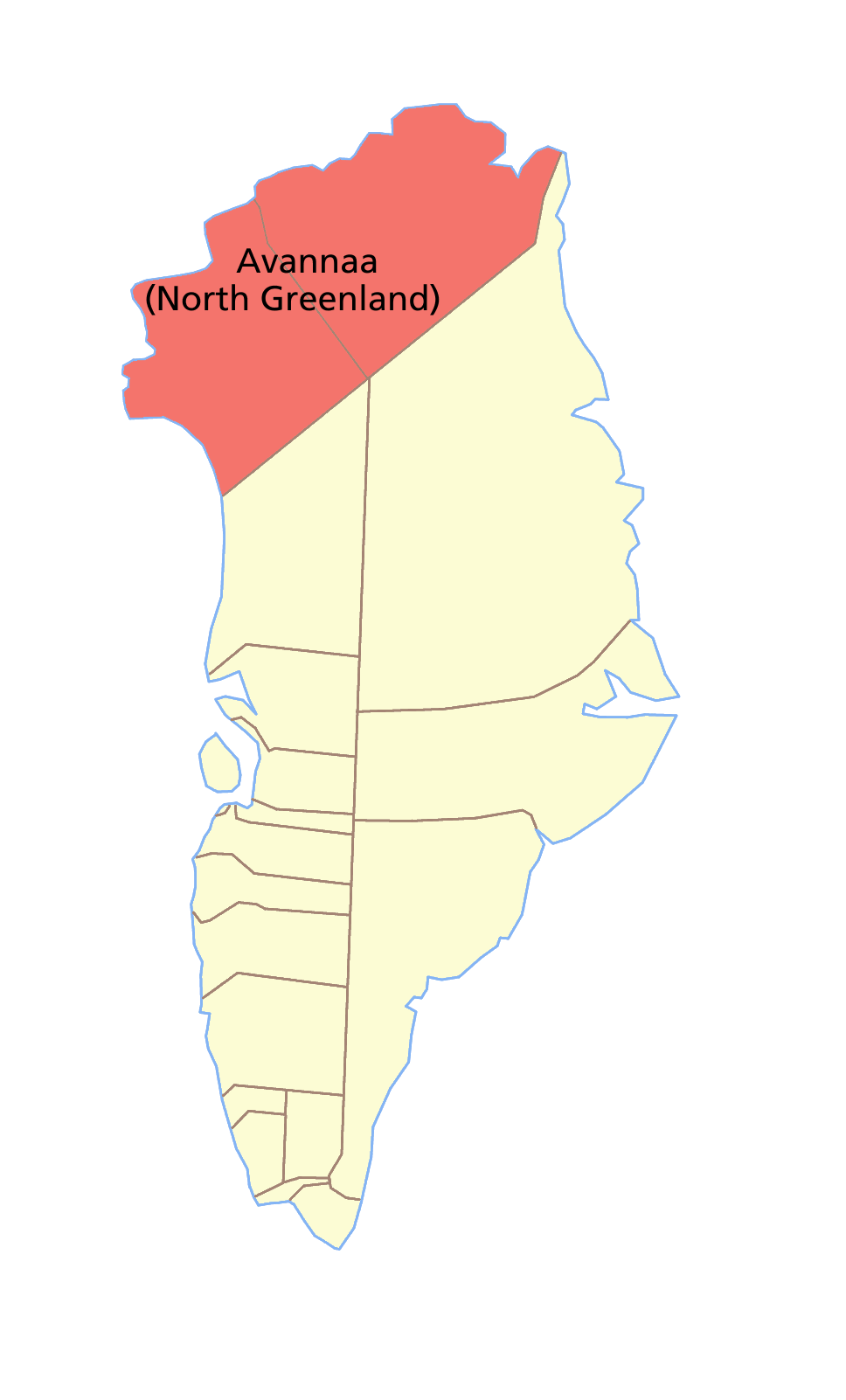
Avannaa in map of Greenland

Avannaa, originally Nordgrønland ("North Greenland"), was one of the three counties (Danish: amt) of Greenland, which existed until 31 December 2008. The county seat was Qaanaaq, the main settlement.

It was one of the least-densely populated administrative divisions in the world, with 843 people living in 106,700 km^{2} of ice-free land, a density of 0.0079 people per square kilometre. The total land area, including the land covered by the ice cap, is over 500,000 km^{2}. North Greenland has a higher portion of ice-free land than most other areas of the country, because much of the extreme north, such as Peary Land, is largely ice-free due to its low precipitation.

The county was also sometimes known as Avannaarsua or Avanersuaq.

== Former local divisions ==
- Qaanaaq municipality, created 1 January 1963
- Pituffik Space Base (Pituffik) (unincorporated), an enclave surrounded by Qaanaaq Municipality (never part of Qaanaaq Municipality)
- Northeast Greenland National Park (northern part, since 1988 taken away from Qaanaaq Municipality, to enlarge the existing National Park) (unincorporated)

== Local occupations ==
Seal hunting is the most important source of income for a large part of the population, and this is why the settlements here are different from those in the rest of Greenland. There are many settlements in the region, and the way of life is different from the one in busier Greenlandic towns. During the winter, when the fjords freeze over, the dog sled is a commonly used means of transport for the fishermen and hunters.

== Wildlife ==
The most common land animals are small mammals such as Arctic foxes or Arctic hares, but large mammals such as reindeer are found in Olrik Fjord, Prudhoe Land and Inglefield Land, while muskoxen are found in the area around Cape Atholl and Inglefield Land. In the part of Avannaa now in Northeast Greenland National Park, the muskox is naturally occurring from Nyeboe Land in the west to Crown Prince Christian Land in the east, including Peary Land. Air and sea life are plentiful; there are many species of gull; further, large numbers of fulmars are often seen close to towns, where they make use of waste products from the fish factories. Prawns, which are among Greenland's top exports, are the reason for many large trawlers and smaller fishing vessels which ply the waters of North Greenland. Also commonly seen is the gigantic fin whale.

== See also ==
- Administrative divisions of Greenland
- North Greenland, a colonial division from 1721 to 1950 with the same English name
- Subdivisions of the Nordic countries
- Thule
