= King Frederik VIII Land =

King Frederik VIII Land Kunngi Frederik VIII Nuna (Greenlandic) Kong Frederik VIII Land (Danish)
- Region
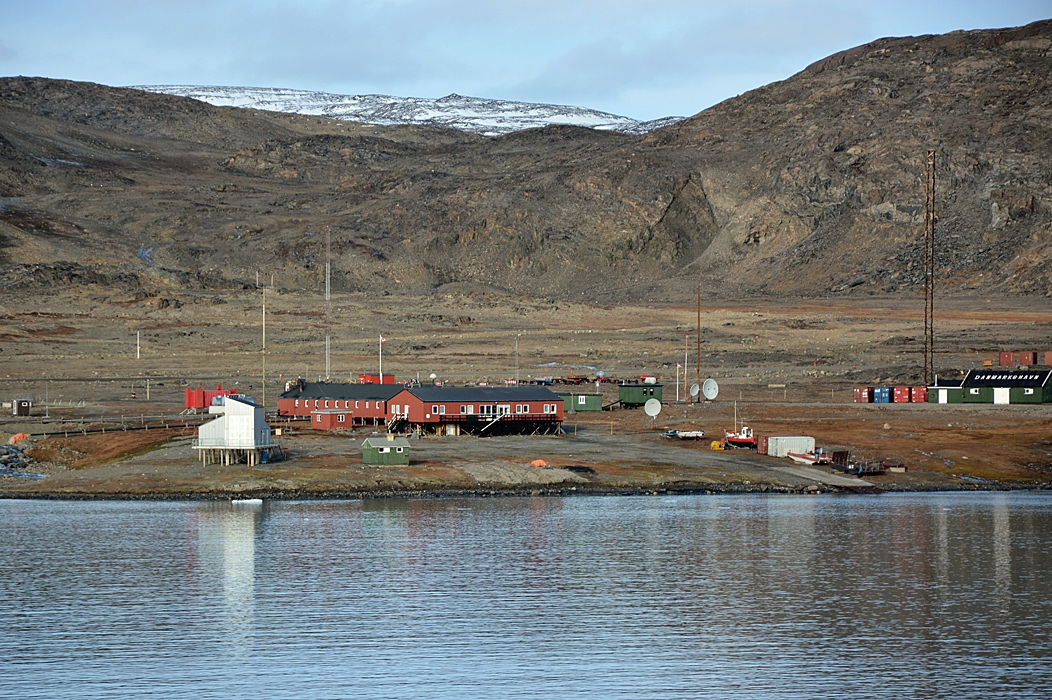
- Landscape of Danmarkshavn.

- Location of King Frederik VIII Land
- Sovereign state: (Danish Realm) Kingdom of Denmark
- Autonomous Territory: Greenland
- Administrative division: Northeast Greenland National Park
- Named for: King Frederik VIII
- Elevation: 900 m (3,000 ft)

King Frederik VIII Land (Greenlandic: Kunngi Frederik VIII Nuna; Danish: Kong Frederik VIII Land) is a major geographic division of northeastern Greenland. It extends above the Arctic Circle from 76°N to 81°N in a North-South direction along the coast of the Greenland Sea.

== History ==
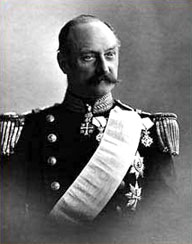
Frederik VIII (r. 1906–1912) who the area is named after.

This vast desolate region was still uncharted territory around 1900. It was explored by the 1906–08 Denmark Expedition, the 1909–12 Alabama Expedition and by J.P. Koch's 1912–13 Danish Expedition to Queen Louise Land, when the ruling monarch was Frederik VIII (1843–1912).

The area between 79° and 81°30´N was first marked as 'King Frederik VIII Land', after King Frederik VIII of Denmark then the ruling monarch, by the 1906–08 Denmark Expedition in its maps of the region. Einar Storgaard used the name again in a 1927 map, and he also proposed a division of the region into a northern and a southern part with a border along Nioghalvfjerd Fjord. Finally the name came into general usage only after the publication of the 1931–34 Three-year Expedition to East Greenland (Treårsekspedition) reports.

== Geography ==
King Frederik VIII Land stretches between 76°N along the middle of the Bessel Fjord in the south and 81°N, the boundary running along the middle of the Independence Fjord and the Academy Glacier. It is bordered by King Christian X Land on the south, the Wandel Sea to the north, Peary Land to the northwest, and the Greenland Ice Sheet to the west. All its territory is included in the large Northeast Greenland National Park zone.

King Frederik VIII Land includes mountain ranges, such as the Princess Caroline-Mathilde Alps, nunataks, such as Queen Louise Land, and vast glacier expanses, such as the Storstrømmen, the Zachariæ Isstrøm and the Nioghalvfjerdsbrae of far northeastern Greenland. In the areas of the shore it also includes fjords, such as the Skaer Fjord, the Ingolf Fjord and the Borg Fjord in Dove Bay, as well as numerous coastal islands, such as Hovgaard Island in the shore of the Greenland Sea or Princess Thyra Island in the Wandel Sea. The Greenland ice sheet reaches the shore at Jøkel Bay. Flade Isblink, the largest independent ice cap in Greenland is also located in King Frederik VIII Land.

The area of King Frederik VIII Land is practically uninhabited. Currently the only two inhabited places are:

- Danmarkshavn weather station is on the southern shore of the Germania Land Peninsula. It was named by the 1906–08 Denmark Expedition after 'Danmark', the ship of the expedition which wintered there.
- Nord, a Danish military base/weather station located further north in the Crown Prince Christian Land Peninsula.

=== Image gallery ===
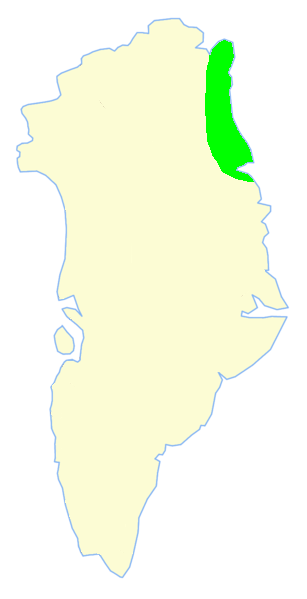
Limits of King Frederik VIII Land

Map of Greenland section

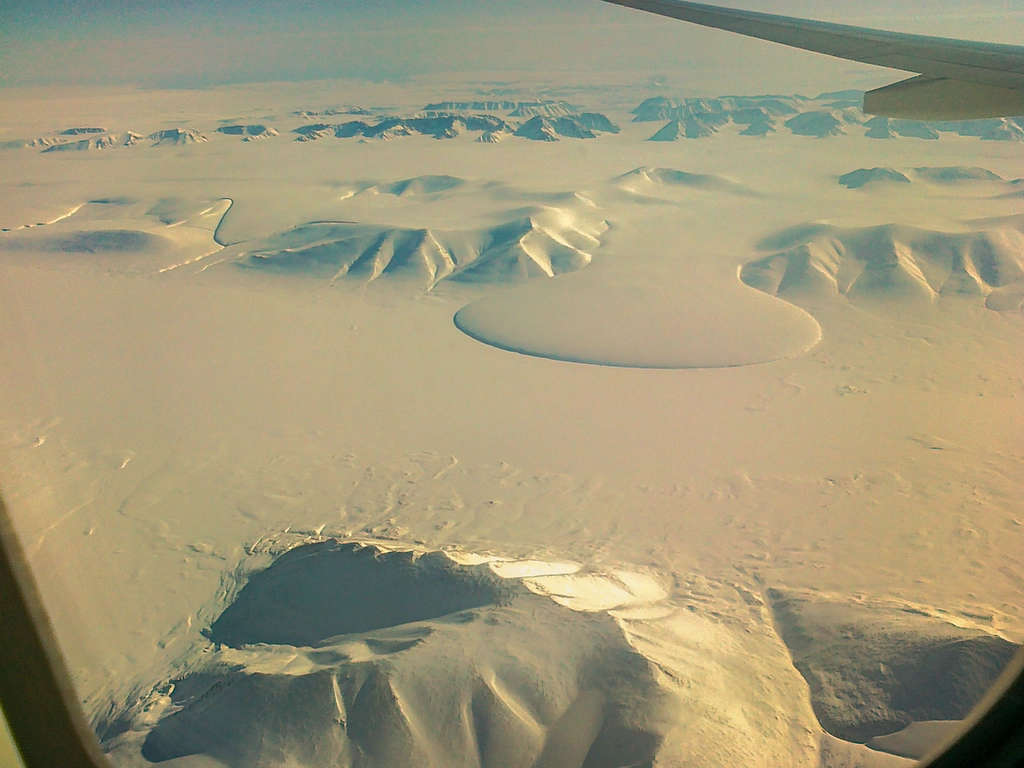
View of the strikingly-shaped Elephant Foot Glacier in Romer Lake, at the far northern limit of King Frederik VIII Land

== See also ==
- Cartographic expeditions to Greenland
