= Station Nord, Greenland =

Nord Station Nord
- Military outpost
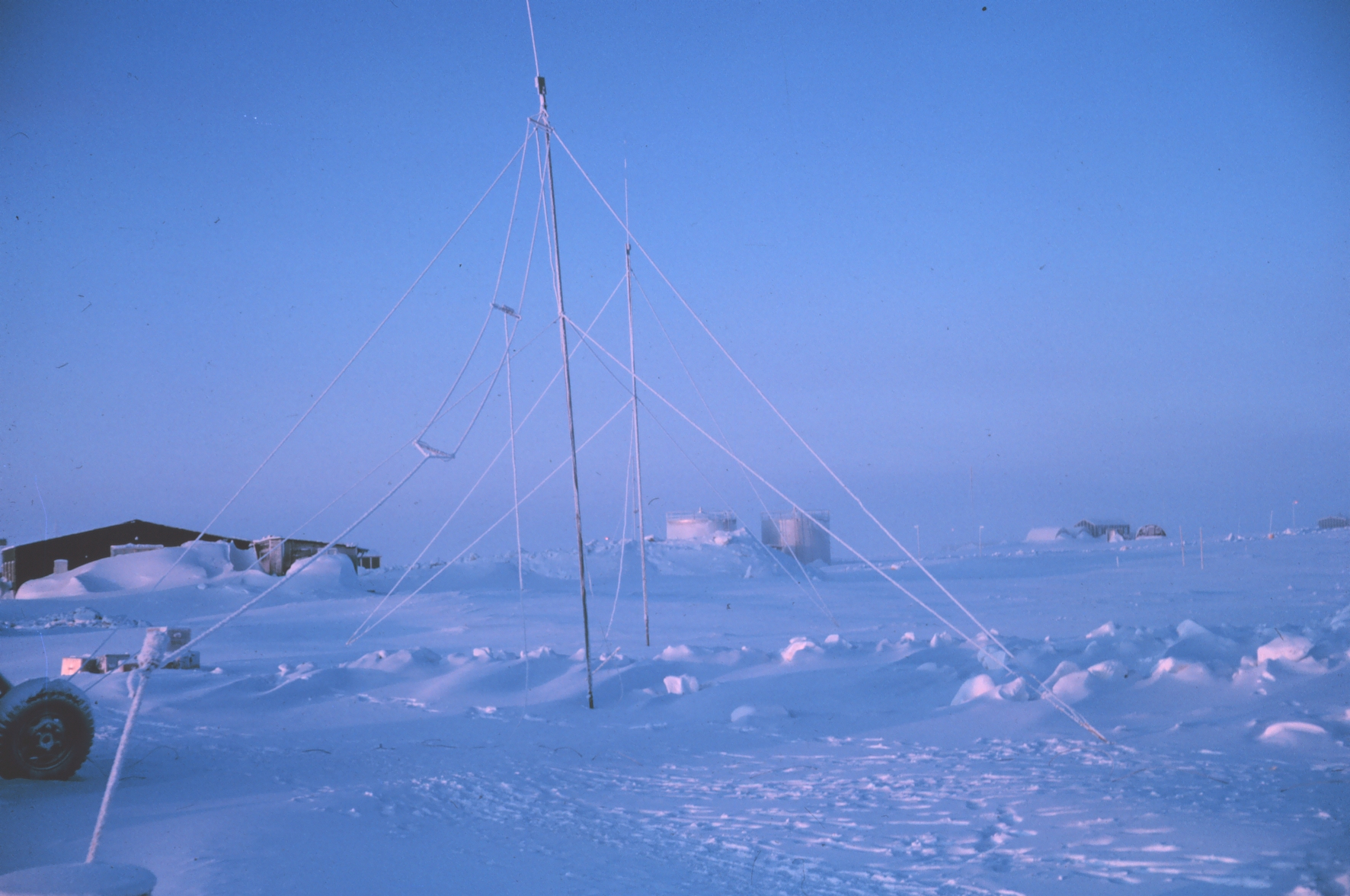
- Station Nord in 1967

- Location within Greenland
- Coordinates: 81°35′57″N 16°38′12″W
- Time zone: UTC+00:00 (Coordinated Universal Time)

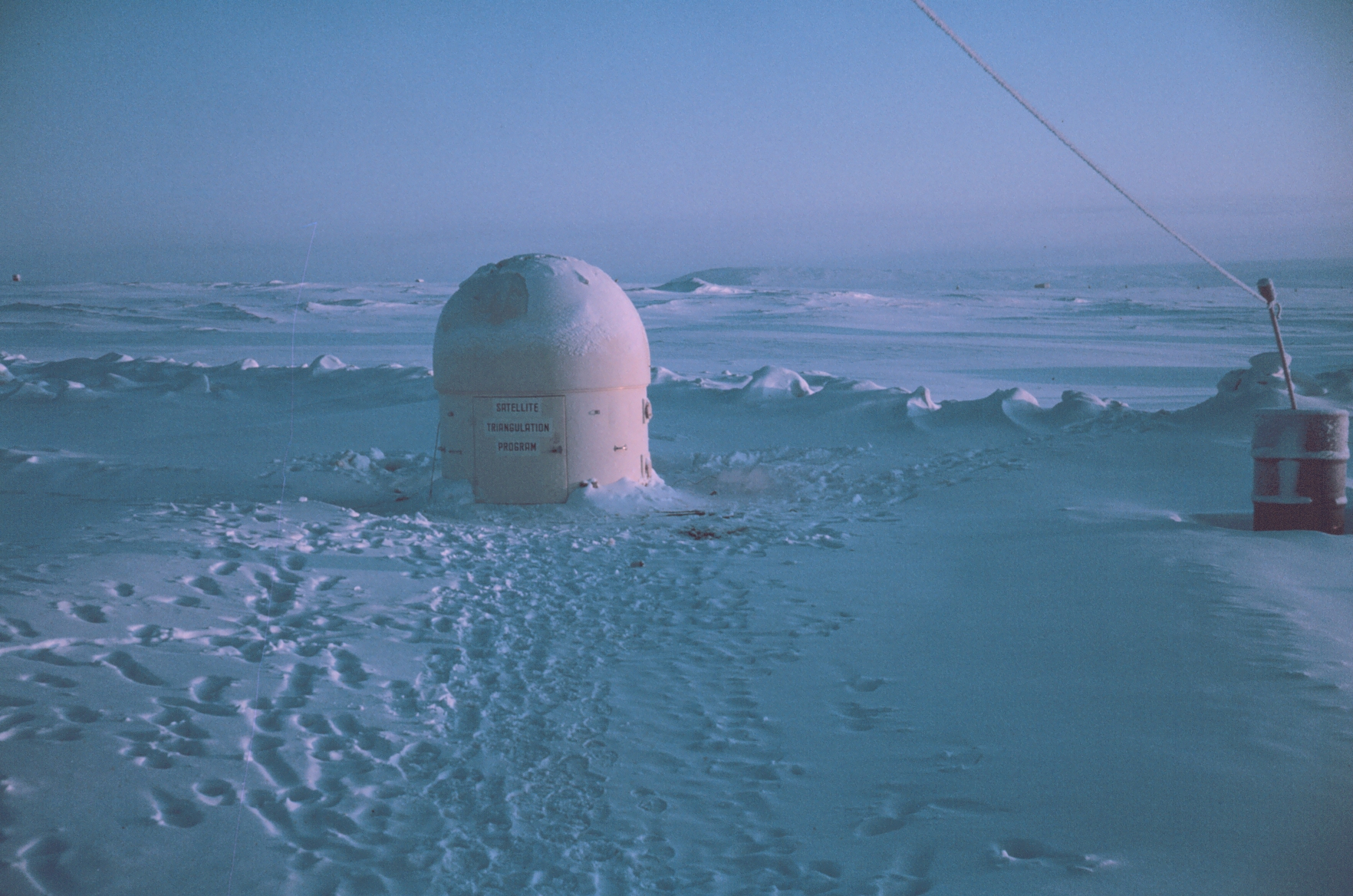
View of the station and the surrounding landscape.

Station Nord (ICAO: BGNO) is a military and scientific station in northeastern Greenland 1700 km north of the Arctic Circle.

It is about 924 km (574 mi) from the geographic North Pole, on Princess Ingeborg Peninsula (Danish: Prinsesse Ingeborg Halvø) in northern Kronprins Christian Land, making it the second northernmost permanent settlement and base of the Northeast Greenland National Park and of Greenland as a whole (two stations in Peary Land further north, Brønlundhus and Kap Harald Moltke, are not permanently occupied).

The Danish Defence Command base is staffed by five Danish non-commissioned officers on a 26-month tour of duty; accommodation is also available for over twenty scientists and other personnel during the summer months. The station has about 35 buildings. It is not accessible by ship; ice conditions would permit a passage only every five to ten years. The name Nord simply means "north" in Danish. Winter darkness extends from 15 October to 28 February.

== History ==
=== Joint U.S.–Danish period ===
In June 1950, the United States Weather Bureau first developed plans for a joint weather station in Northeast Greenland to supplement the joint weather stations being built with Canada in the high Arctic. At that time, Thule was itself a joint Danish-American weather station. The next year, in conjunction with the construction of Thule Air Base, Norwegian-born United States Air Force Colonel Bernt Balchen (who was the driving force in the American Arctic efforts) proposed a major air base in Northeast Greenland, useful for radar coverage, navigation aids, search-and-rescue, and recovery of heavy bombers returning from the USSR. Two 10,000 foot runways were contemplated. After consultations with Denmark, a weather station was operational at Nord by 1 May 1952, and a U.S.-built landing strip was available by July of that year. At that time, American interest was still focused on the possibility of a major airfield either near Nord or in Peary Land.

By February 1953, the United States Air Force abandoned the air base plans and settled on a minor role for the airstrip at Nord. During that summer, an expansion of the gravel strip was carried out, a team of 41 Danes was sent to construct facilities, and the finished weather station was in operation on 1 October. The major reason for the reduction in the United States Air Force's plans was that resupply of the station was difficult and expensive. Permanent polar ice prevents supply by sea, and attempts to move heavy supplies by trans-icecap convoys from Camp TUTO were problematic. In practice, everything had to be flown in from Thule. While this was initially a United States Air Force task, it later devolved on the Royal Danish Air Force, which flew C-130s from Thule to Nord in biannual operations codenamed Brilliant Ice; today resupply is done by commercial charter.

Another factor was Danish sensitivity to U.S. activities. It was very important for the Danish government to preempt a permanent U.S. presence, and for that reason Denmark assumed responsibility for Nord's operation and refused an American offer for a lease on the station. The understanding, codified by Memorandum of Understanding in 1954, was that Nord would be available to U.S. forces as needed; however, later proposals (1957) to establish a major electronic intelligence base there were shifted to Canadian Forces Station Alert. Nord served as an emergency recovery site for American bombers in the 1950s, and for the occasional civilian aircraft in trouble. A U.S. satellite tracking station also operated there.

In 1968, Nord reportedly had a staff of 30 men, 25 buildings, and seven antennas. Routine communications was by radiotelegraphy to Angmagssalik. By the time of the end of the United States' responsibilities, Nord had a 6,200-foot (1,900 m) runway (elevation 80), a non-directional beacon, a meteorological observatory for synoptic and radiosonde observations, and a seismic station.

=== Danish period ===
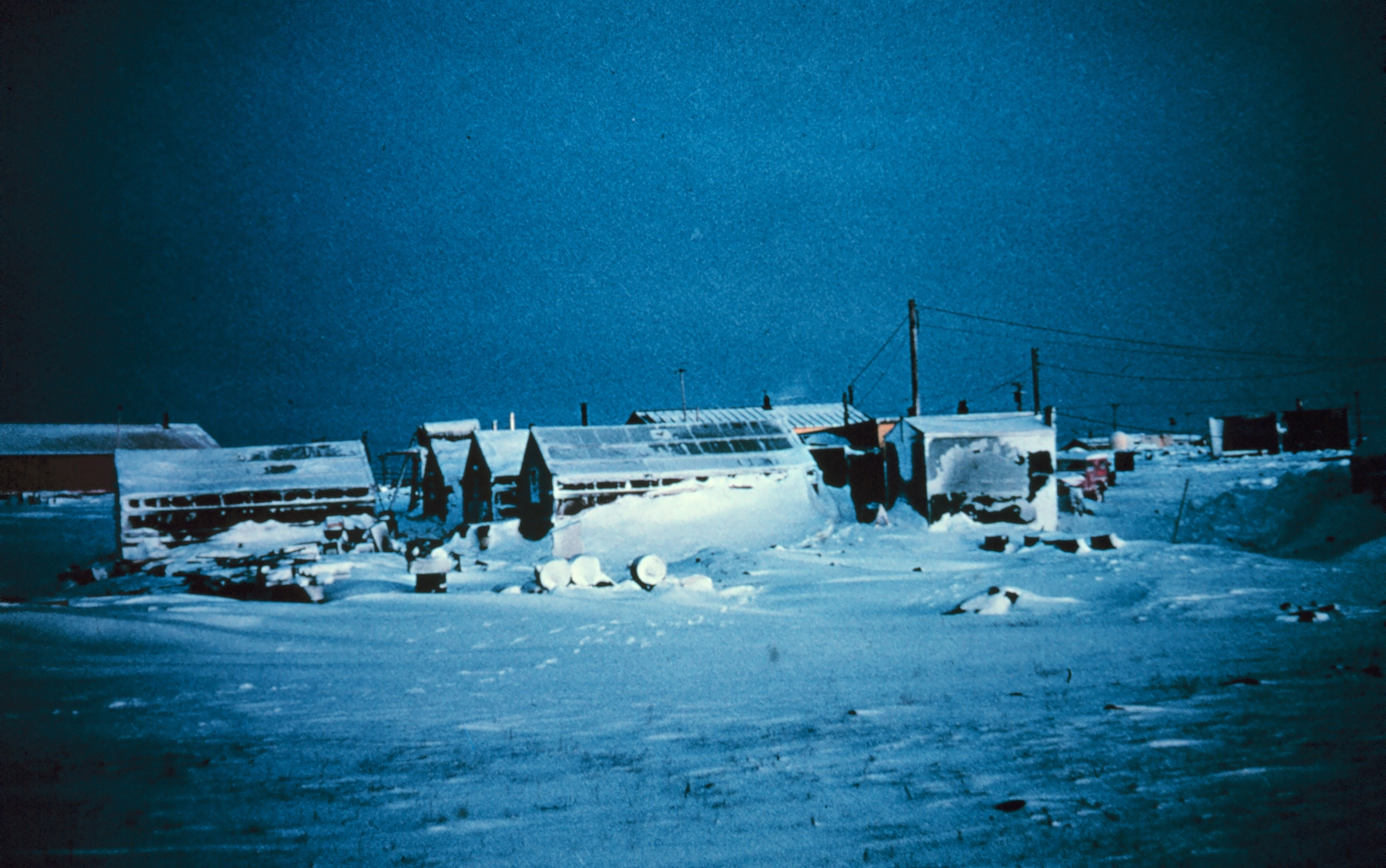
Station Nord in 1966

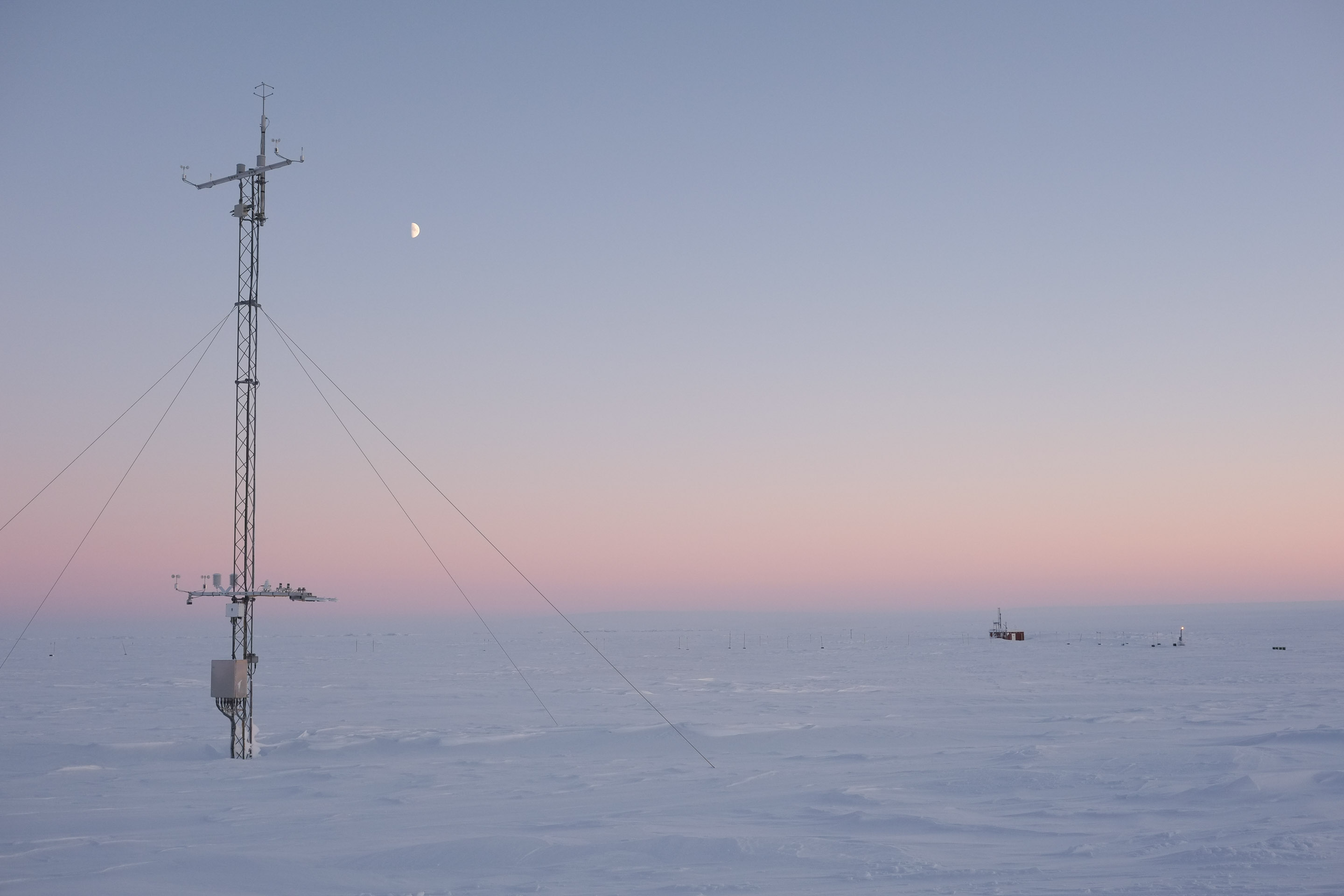
Atmospheric measurement instruments at the station

The original station was built by "Grønlands Televæsen" for the United States during the period of 1952 to 1956 as a weather and telecommunications site with a runway, International Civil Aviation Organization code BGMI. From the perspective of Denmark, Nord was meteorologically needed as the only weather station within hundreds of miles, and also as a resupply base for the Sirius Patrol, a dog-sledge patrol that replaced the improvised wartime sledge patrol in Northeast Greenland. The construction of Station Nord was undertaken by Danish construction companies and financed by the Danish government, with the United States contributing to the transportation of equipment from the Thule Air Base and paying subsidies to maintain the operation of the station. Some of the equipment originally supplied by the United States Air Force is still in use. Until its closure in 1972, it was run as a civilian base by the Greenland Technical Organisation.

When Denmark requested funds for repairs to the runway in 1964, the United States Department of State advised that Nord was no longer essential, and that new cost arrangements would have to be made. The Danish agencies could not agree on who should bear the costs. In April 1971, the United States Air Force announced it would cease sending goods and fuel from Thule to Station Nord. Without support from the United States, the government of Denmark decided to close the station as the relevant agencies considered it too expensive to run.

After the closure in late June 1972, many scientists and military officers protested and demanded that it be reopened. Station Nord was important to the Royal Danish Army and the Royal Danish Air Force as a military base, enabling flights to the northern part of the National Park and support of the Sirius Patrol. Civilian scientific activities in the area were also gradually increasing.

In 1974, the Defence Command submitted plans to build a patrol station and a landing strip. Reconnaissance began in March 1974 by the air force and helicopters from "Grønlandsfly" and cabins for the sledge patrol began to be built and patrol depots restocked.

With the establishment of a new weather station and the base now rebuilt, the Danish Defense Command reopened Nord in August 1975. Nord was reopened as a military base for a trial period. The station was recognized as important as a gateway to otherwise inaccessible portions of northern Greenland, and was made permanent.

Today the operation of the station is under the responsibility of the Joint Arctic Command (Arktisk Kommando), but is staffed on a daily basis with personnel from the three services and five volunteers are stationed there 26 months at a time with a 3–5 weeks leave period in the middle. The landing strip is kept open for approximately 300 days a year and is maintained with two large snow blowers and two snow plows.

Since 2009, a joint Ukrainian-Danish Operation "Northern Falcon" for the transportation of fuel from the US Air Force "Thule" to the Danish Polar Station "Nord" by the military transport aircraft IL-76MD of the 25th Transport Aviation Brigade has run. It has been conducted annually since its commencement.

== Climate ==
Located very close to the Flade Isblink ice cap, the station features a very cold polar tundra climate (ET) with average temperatures just a few degrees above freezing in the midst of the short summer.

Climate data for Station Nord, Greenland (1991-2020): 34m
Month	Jan	Feb	Mar	Apr	May	Jun	Jul	Aug	Sep	Oct	Nov	Dec	Year
Record high °C (°F)	0.4 (32.7)	2.5 (36.5)	−1.7 (28.9)	0.6 (33.1)	7.9 (46.2)	13.4 (56.1)	17.0 (62.6)	16.9 (62.4)	6.8 (44.2)	7.6 (45.7)	0.8 (33.4)	3.1 (37.6)	17.0 (62.6)
Mean daily maximum °C (°F)	−25.3 (−13.5)	−25.6 (−14.1)	−25.7 (−14.3)	−17.9 (−0.2)	−6.4 (20.5)	3.1 (37.6)	6.8 (44.2)	4.7 (40.5)	−5.0 (23.0)	−14.6 (5.7)	−19.5 (−3.1)	−22.9 (−9.2)	−12.4 (9.8)
Daily mean °C (°F)	−28.3 (−18.9)	−28.7 (−19.7)	−28.9 (−20.0)	−20.9 (−5.6)	−9.0 (15.8)	0.7 (33.3)	4.2 (39.6)	2.4 (36.3)	−7.0 (19.4)	−17.1 (1.2)	−22.4 (−8.3)	−26.1 (−15.0)	−15.1 (4.8)
Mean daily minimum °C (°F)	−31.4 (−24.5)	−32.0 (−25.6)	−32.2 (−26.0)	−24.2 (−11.6)	−11.9 (10.6)	−1.6 (29.1)	1.7 (35.1)	0.0 (32.0)	−9.3 (15.3)	−19.9 (−3.8)	−25.6 (−14.1)	−29.4 (−20.9)	−18.0 (−0.4)
Record low °C (°F)	−47.9 (−54.2)	−47.2 (−53.0)	−46.0 (−50.8)	−39.5 (−39.1)	−24.7 (−12.5)	−12.9 (8.8)	−7.4 (18.7)	−8.5 (16.7)	−25.9 (−14.6)	−37.9 (−36.2)	−39.9 (−39.8)	−45.8 (−50.4)	−47.9 (−54.2)
Average precipitation mm (inches)	25.3 (1.00)	23.8 (0.94)	29.4 (1.16)	24.6 (0.97)	20.6 (0.81)	11.3 (0.44)	30.4 (1.20)	29.3 (1.15)	40.5 (1.59)	34.6 (1.36)	31.9 (1.26)	27.0 (1.06)	328.7 (12.94)
Average precipitation days (≥ 0.1 mm)	12.1	10.1	10.9	9.1	7.7	5.2	6.4	7.2	10.6	11.3	11.6	12.4	114.6
Source: Danish Meteorological Institute

Climate data for Station Nord, Greenland (extremes 1952–present)
Month	Jan	Feb	Mar	Apr	May	Jun	Jul	Aug	Sep	Oct	Nov	Dec	Year
Record high °C (°F)	0.4 (32.7)	1.7 (35.1)	−2.0 (28.4)	1.2 (34.2)	7.8 (46.0)	13.4 (56.1)	17.0 (62.6)	15.5 (59.9)	12.3 (54.1)	7.7 (45.9)	2.3 (36.1)	3.2 (37.8)	17.0 (62.6)
Mean daily maximum °C (°F)	−26.0 (−14.8)	−26.8 (−16.2)	−26.5 (−15.7)	−19.5 (−3.1)	−6.7 (19.9)	2.1 (35.8)	6.2 (43.2)	4.6 (40.3)	−6.0 (21.2)	−15.9 (3.4)	−21.6 (−6.9)	−24.1 (−11.4)	−13.4 (7.9)
Daily mean °C (°F)	−30.1 (−22.2)	−30.9 (−23.6)	−30.7 (−23.3)	−22.7 (−8.9)	−9.9 (14.2)	−0.4 (31.3)	3.4 (38.1)	2.1 (35.8)	−9.2 (15.4)	−19.7 (−3.5)	−25.8 (−14.4)	−28.0 (−18.4)	−16.9 (1.6)
Mean daily minimum °C (°F)	−35.9 (−32.6)	−36.1 (−33.0)	−35.3 (−31.5)	−27.9 (−18.2)	−14.1 (6.6)	−3.7 (25.3)	0.1 (32.2)	−1.2 (29.8)	−12.6 (9.3)	−24.1 (−11.4)	−30.0 (−22.0)	−33.3 (−27.9)	−21.2 (−6.2)
Record low °C (°F)	−51.9 (−61.4)	−51.2 (−60.2)	−46.0 (−50.8)	−42.8 (−45.0)	−25.9 (−14.6)	−12.9 (8.8)	−7.4 (18.7)	−13.3 (8.1)	−29.8 (−21.6)	−36.9 (−34.4)	−39.9 (−39.8)	−45.8 (−50.4)	−51.9 (−61.4)
Average precipitation mm (inches)	11 (0.4)	12 (0.5)	13 (0.5)	23 (0.9)	12 (0.5)	11 (0.4)	20 (0.8)	17 (0.7)	23 (0.9)	19 (0.7)	20 (0.8)	17 (0.7)	188 (7.4)
Average precipitation days (≥ 0.1 mm)	9.4	10.0	9.6	8.1	7.1	5.9	7.2	6.9	10.3	11.1	12.5	10.3	107.3
Average snowy days	7.0	8.6	7.9	7.7	6.0	4.8	4.5	3.3	8.5	9.8	10.6	8.9	98.0
Average relative humidity (%)	76	76	77	79	79	82	80	81	85	82	80	77	80
Source 1: Danish Meteorological Institute
Source 2: Meteo Climat (record highs and lows), NOAA (humidity 1961–1990)

== See also ==
- List of research stations in the Arctic
- Operation "Northern Falcon"
- Centrum Lake

== Bibliography ==
- Greenland During the Cold War, Danish Institute for Foreign Policy (DUPI), 1997
- The Book About Greenland, Politiken, Copenhagen, 1970.
- ONC Chart A-1, 1:1000000, Air Information current thru 3 June 1969. Department of Defense.
