= Dijmphna =

Danish steamship

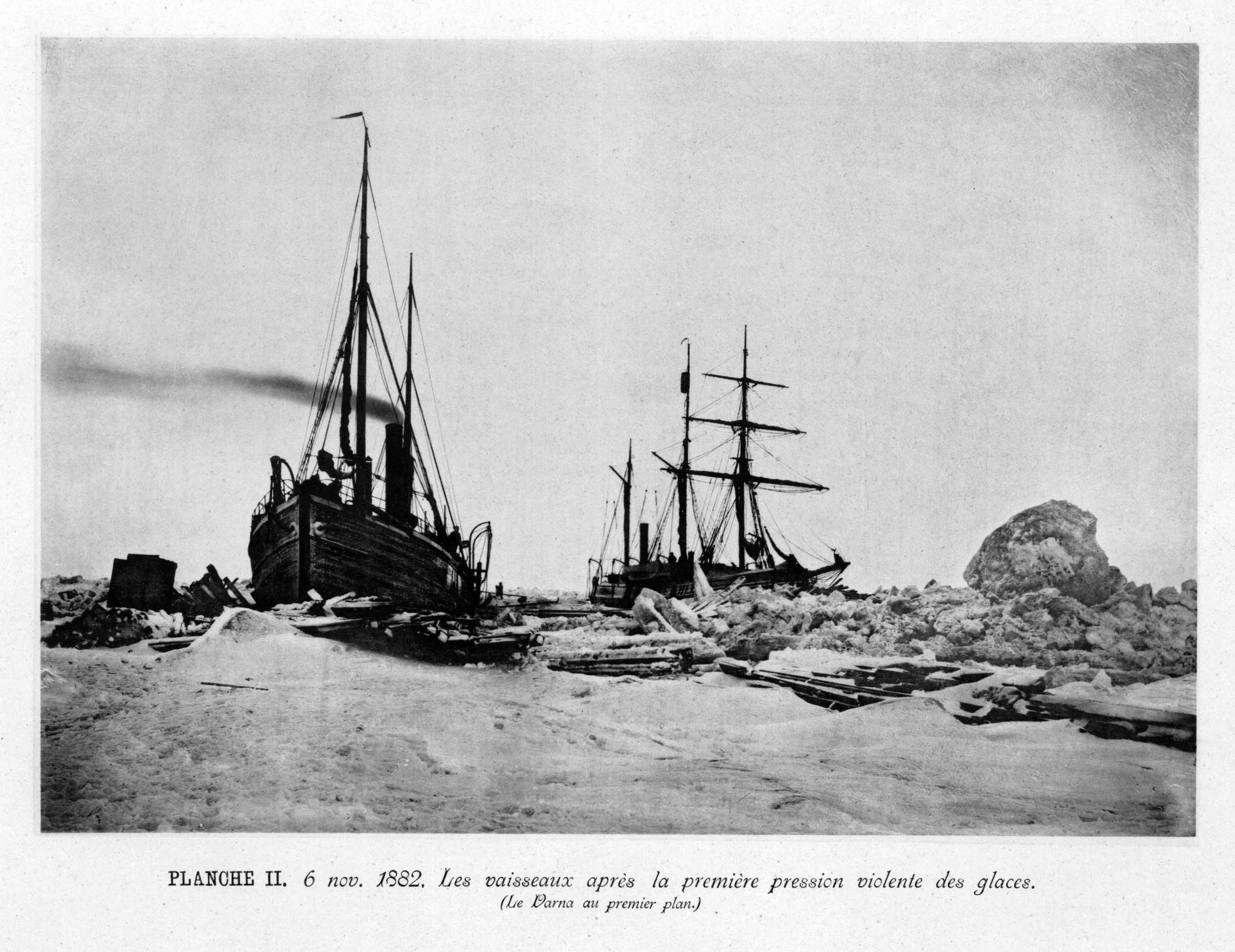
- Dijmphna (in the rear) in the Kara Sea assisting the Dutch expedition ship Varna

History

Sweden
- Name: Linköping
- Owner: 1871-74 P.Eggertz; 1874-78 A.G. Lindberg; 1878-80 P. Eggerz; 1880-1882 J.D. Grönvall
- Builder: Sjötorp, Sweden
- Launched: 1871
- Home port: 1871-1880 Vadstena; 1880-1882 Gothenburg

History

Denmark
- Name: Dijmpna
- Owner: 1882-1888 Aug. Gamél; 1888 P.F. Jepsen; 1888-89 C.C. Trane
- Home port: Copenhagen
- Fate: Sold to Sweden in 1889

General characteristics
- Class & type: 3-masted steam schooner
- Tons burthen: 191 BRT / 142 NRT
- Length: 98 ft (30 m)
- Beam: 20 ft (6.1 m)
- Draught: 12 ft (3.7 m)
- Propulsion: 25 HP Steam engine

Dijmphna was as schooner-rigged steamship, built in 1871 in Sweden and named Linköping. During her first years Linköping sailed as a merchant in the North Sea and the Baltic but was sold in 1882 to the wealthy coffee trader and businessman Antoine Cyrille Frederik Gamél in Copenhagen. The ship was renamed Dijmphna in memory of Gamèl's mother, Maria Dijmphna Verves, reinforced for sailing in ice and equipped as polar expedition vessel, all paid for by Gamèl.

== The Dijmphna expedition ==
The purpose of the expedition and the reason for purchasing the ship was the idea proposed by Andreas Peter Hovgaard that an undiscovered land mass existed north of the Taymyr Peninsula. The aim of the expedition was to find this land mass and follow the eastern coast towards the North Pole. The expedition was a contribution to the first International Polar Year and one of the goals was to join with the Dutch expedition led by Maurits Snellen, on the Norwegian polar ship Varna.

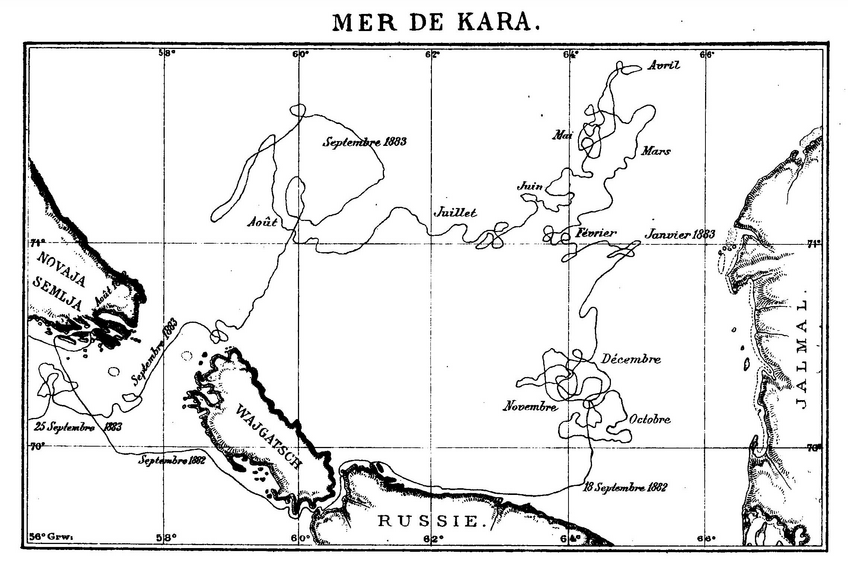
Route of the Dijmphna expedition in the Kara Sea

Dijmpna left Copenhagen on 18 July 1882, with provisions for 27 months, and two weeks later than Varna had left Amsterdam. Leader of the expedition was Andreas Peter Hovgaard, with lieutenants Niels Theodor Olsen and Alfred Garde as second and third commanding officers. On board was also the botanist Theodor Herman Holm.

The expedition sailed along the coast of Norway, across the Barents Sea and to the southern tip of Novaja Zemlja, which was reached on 7 August 1882. Heavy drift ice was encountered in the Kara Sea, preventing further progress. Botanical studies were undertaken on Novaja Zemlja while waiting for ice conditions to improve. Only a month later, on 7 September, did Dijmphna make its way into the Kara Sea. Here the expedition rescued a Russian hunter, Bibikof, who had been stuck on Novaja Zemlja for two years. After Bibikof had been sailed to the mainland, south of Vaygach Island, Dijmphna finally made contact with Varna. Varna was stuck in the ice and as Dijmphna tried to assist her, Dijmphna itself got stuck as well. On Christmas Eve 1882 the ice movements became so violent that Varna was crushed and the crew was transferred to Dijmphna to overwinter on the small ship together with its own crew. The ice did not loosen grip of the ships before the middle of July 1883, where Varna finally sank and Dijmphna could continue its voyage. Snellen continued his studies, now from small boats and sledges, along the coast of Novaja Zemlja. On 25 August 1883 Snellen and his crew met the ship A.E. Nordenskiöld, sent to look for them, and they were brought back to Hammerfest, where they could wire a message to Gamél that Dijmphna and crew were fine. That was the first sign of life heard from Dijmphna for more than a year. However, the trouble for Dijmphna was not over. On 2 August, the day after Snellen left the ship, the propeller shaft broke and the ship was again stuck in the ice. The ice did not loosen its grip until 13 September, where they could continue by sail and warping, until they finally arrived at Vardø, Norway in beginning of November. Here they were able to repair the ship and continue the journey homeward. Dijmphna made a short call in Gothenburg and finally arrived in Copenhagen on 9 December 1883, to receive a royal welcome.

== Other ==
Dijmphna Sund is a sound in NE-Greenland (80°07.0´N 18°00.0´W), separating Hovgaard Island and Lynn Island, and named after Dijmphna by the Danmark Expedition 1906-08.
