= Spalte Glacier =

Glacier near Nioghalvfjerdsfjorden, Groenland

- Location within Greenland
- Location: Crown Prince Christian Land, in Northeast Greenland
- Coordinates: 79°43′N 20°16′W
- Area: 110 square km
- Length: 15 km (9.3 mi)
- Width: 10 km (6.2 mi)
- Lowest elevation: 0m
- Terminus: Dijmphna Sound
- Status: Disintegrated

The Spalte Glacier was a large floating glacier located in Crown Prince Christian Land, northeastern Greenland. The glacier broke up and completely disintegrated in July 2020.

== Geography ==
The glacier was a northern offshoot of the Nioghalvfjerdsbrae glacier as it split either side of Hovgaard Island. The main flow of the Nioghalvfjerdsbrae flows eastward out into Nioghalvfjerd Fjord while a smaller branch, the Spalte Glacier, flowed north into Dijmphna Sound.

In July 2020, satellite images showed the complete break up of the Spalte Glacier. An area of 125 square km of ice broke away leaving a calving front along the side of the main flow of the Nioghalvfjerdsbrae glacier.

== See also ==
- List of glaciers in Greenland
