= Antarctic Bay (Greenland) =

Bay in Northeast Greenland National Park, Greenland

- Antarctic Bugt
- Location in Greenland
- Location: Peary Land, Arctic
- Coordinates: 81°3′N 14°20′W
- Ocean/sea sources: Greenland Sea
- Basin countries: Greenland
- Max. length: 14 km (8.7 mi)
- Max. width: 17 km (11 mi)
- Frozen: All year round
- Settlements: 0

Antarctic Bay (Danish: Antarctic Bugt) is a bay in the Greenland Sea coast of the Crown Prince Christian Land peninsula, King Frederick VIII Land, Northeastern Greenland. Administratively the bay and its surroundings belong to the Northeast Greenland National Park.

The area of the bay is uninhabited.

== History ==
The bay was named by the 1906-1908 Denmark expedition after Alfred Gabriel Nathorst's ship Antarctic.

== Geography ==
Antarctic Bay opens to the Fram Strait of the Greenland Sea. It lies between Amdrup Land to the west and the Flade Isblink ice cap to the north. It is a fairly wide bay, with the Nordostrundingen about 50 km (31 mi) to the northeast of its unnamed northeastern point. Sophus Müller Naes is the southwestern point of the bay. Kilen lies just a few km north of the ice-covered head and northeastern shore of the bay. The waters of bay are clogged by fast ice the year round.

Map of Crown Prince Christian Land's northern half.

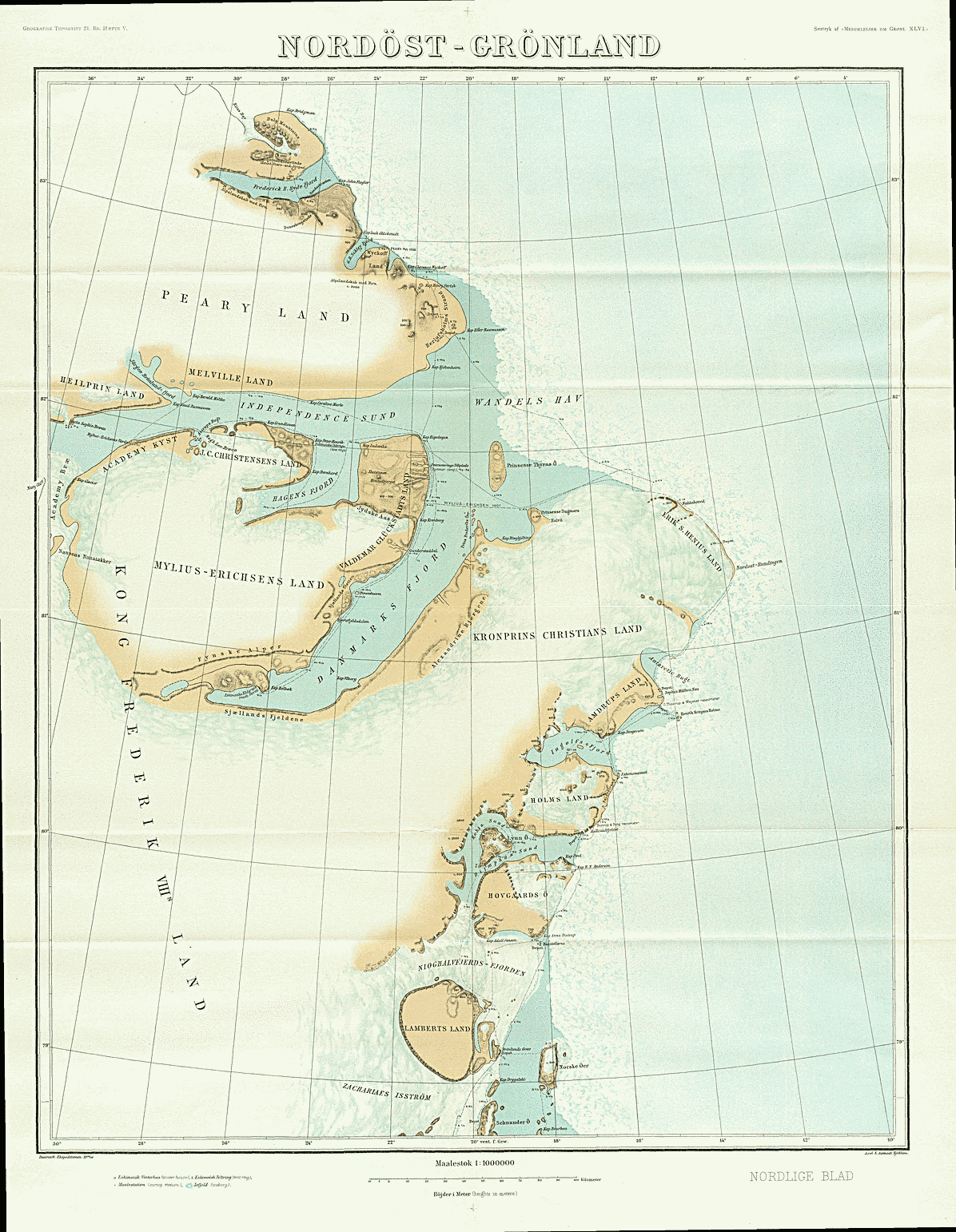
Johan Peter Koch's 1911 map of NE Greenland showing Crown Prince Christian Land.
