= Hekla Sound =

Body of water in Greenland

- Hekla Sund
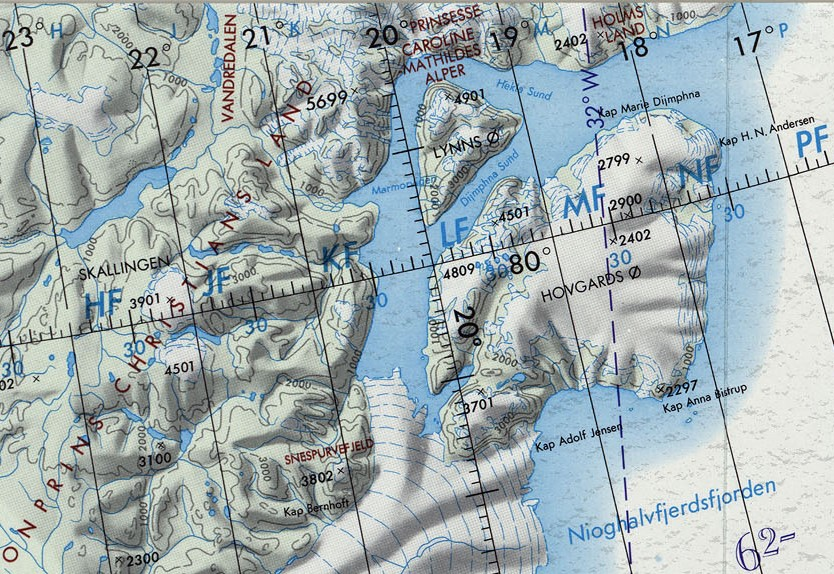

- Location within Greenland
- Location: NE Greenland
- Coordinates: 80°12′30″N 19°0′0″W
- Part of: Arctic Ocean
- Ocean/sea sources: Greenland Sea
- Basin countries: Greenland
- Max. length: 50 km (31 mi)
- Max. width: 12 km (7.5 mi)
- Frozen: All year round
- Settlements: 0

The Hekla Sound (Danish: Hekla Sund) is a sound in King Frederick VIII Land, Northeast Greenland. Administratively it is part of the Northeast Greenland National Park zone.

== History ==
The sound was named by the ill-fated 1906-1908 Denmark expedition after ship Hekla.

== Geography ==
The Hekla Sound branches to the NW of the Dijmphna Sound at Cape Marie Dijmphna, separating the shore of Lynn Island from the southwestern shore of Holm Land with the southern end of the Princess Caroline-Mathilde Alps to the north. Further west it bends roughly southward, with Skallingen in the Greenland mainland to the west, joining again with the Dijmphna Sound.

Map of Northeastern Greenland

== See also ==
- List of fjords of Greenland
