= 79 North =

79 North may refer to:

- The 79th parallel north
- Nioghalvfjerdsbrae, a glacier in Greenland whose name is Danish for "79 Glacier", and is sometimes referred to in English as "79 North"
