= Danmark (ship, 1855) =

Danish arctic expedition ship

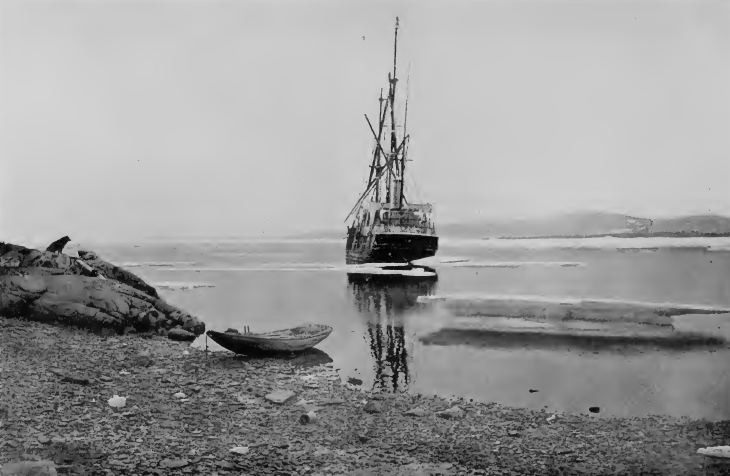
- Danmark in Danmarkshavn, 1907

History

United Kingdom
- Name: Sir Colin Campbell
- Owner: W.H. Alexander, Peterhead
- Builder: Sunderland, England
- Launched: 1855
- Out of service: 1862
- Home port: Peterhead

United Kingdom
- Owner: G. Paul
- In service: 1862
- Out of service: 1871
- Home port: Peterhead

Norway
- Owner: F. Hansen & Co.
- In service: 1871
- Out of service: 1892
- Renamed: Magdalena
- Home port: Tønsberg
- Identification: HLDQ

Norway
- Owner: Gustav C. Hansen
- In service: 1892
- Out of service: 1901
- Home port: Christiania

Norway
- Owner: Alfred Nilsson
- In service: 1901
- Out of service: 1906
- Home port: Tønsberg

Denmark
- Owner: Danish Expedition Fund
- In service: 1906
- Out of service: 1909
- Renamed: Danmark
- Home port: Copenhagen
- Identification: NPSR

Denmark
- Owner: Grønlands Minedrift A/S
- In service: 1906
- Out of service: 1917
- Home port: Copenhagen
- Fate: Wrecked at Höganäs 13 Dec 1917, scrapped in 1918 in Helsingør

General characteristics
- Class & type: Steam bark
- Tonnage: 377 GRT, 242 NRT (1906)
- Length: 122.5 ft (37.3 m)
- Beam: 30.2 ft (9.2 m)
- Draught: 17.5 ft (5.3 m)
- Propulsion: Steam engine, 98 HP high pressure; 200 HP triple expanstion (Akers, Christiania) from 1892
- Speed: up to 6 knots under engine

The bark Danmark is best known for her role as expedition ship for the Danmark expedition (1906–1908), so named after the ship, but had a long prehistory as a whaler under the name Sir Colin Campbell of Peterhead and later as a sealer named Magdalena of Tønsberg/Kristiania.

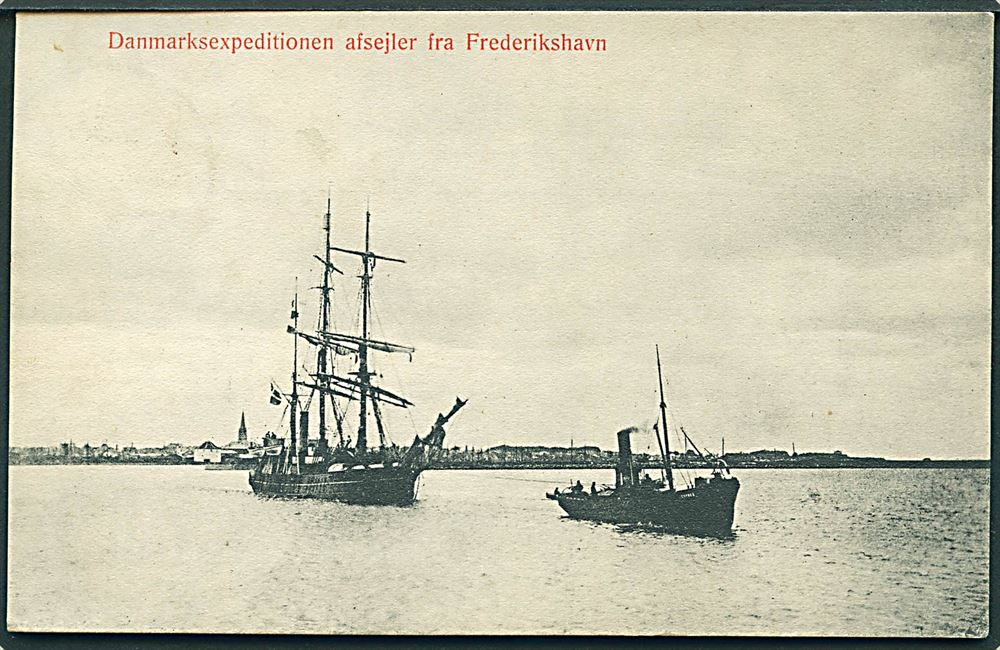
Danmark leaving Fredrikshavn for the Danmark Expedition to NE Grenland 1906-1908

The ship was built in Sunderland, England in 1855, rigged as a three-masted steam bark and originally fitted with a 98 hp high pressure steam engine. She sailed under the name Sir Colin Campbell on whaling trips from Scotland to the Greenland Sea and Davis Strait. In 1892 she was sold to Norway, refitted with a 200 hp triple expansion engine, renamed Magdalena and sailed as a seal catcher until 1906. The later polar explorer Roald Amundsen sailed on Magdalena in 1884 on a seal hunt into the West Ice. From the records of the oil factory of J.A. Nielson in Tønsberg it is reported that Magdalena, owned by Gustav C. Hansen, was the first ship to process blubber at the factory when it opened in 1883 (1,300-1,400 barrels of seal oil). In 1901 the ship was used to deploy stores on Shannon Island and Bass Rock, East Greenland for the American Baldwin-Ziegler Expedition. In 1906 Magdalena was sold for a price of 39,250 kroner to the Danish Expedition Fund, to serve as ship for the upcoming expedition to Northeast Greenland. She underwent refurbishing and was rechristened to Danmark.

== Danmark Expedition ==
Danmark left Copenhagen 24 June 1906 and left for Greenland on 2 July after a short stop in Frederikshavn. Leader of the expedition was shared between Ludvig Mylius-Erichsen (who did not return from the expedition but died on the ice at Nioghalvfjerds Fjorden) and captain of the ship Alf Trolle. Danmark reached the West Ice in late July and with some difficulties passed through the ice and reached a protected bay, which they named Danmark Havn (Danmark harbour) after the ship and which became the base for the ship during two overwinterings. Other places in NE Greenland named after Danmark are Danmarksfjorden and Danmarksmonumentet, a mountain near Mørkefjord. Danmark left Greenland on 21 July 1908 and although the boiler was damaged in a collision with an iceberg in the West Ice, she reached Bergen in Norway safely on 15 August and returned to Copenhagen on 23 August.

== Later fate ==
Upon return to Copenhagen Danmark was set for sale. In the meantime, in the summer 1909 she went on another voyage to Greenland, this time to Qaanaaq (Thule), before being sold in 1910 to the mining company Grønlandsk Minedrift A/S for the price of 15,000 kroner. The ship continued to sail on Greenland, transporting ore and minerals to Denmark, until unfortunate events led to its loss in 1917. When Danmark returned from Greenland with 130 ton of Cryolite and ore the crew had been away from civilization for so long that they were unaware of the outbreak of the First World War and met no ships on their return voyage that could tell them. Thus, when they reached the entrance to the Sound, they did not know that all lighthouses had been switched off and they ran aground on the Swedish coast at Höganäs. The crew was rescued, but the ship could not be saved and was later towed to Helsingør, where it was broken up in 1918.
