= Antoine Gamél =

Antoine Cyrille Frederik Gamél
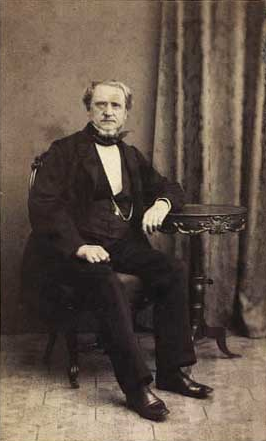
- Born: 11 May 1809; Copenhagen
- Died: 24 April 1879 (aged 69); Copenhagen
- Citizenship: Denmark
- Education: Efterslægtselskabets Skole
- Occupation: Merchant
- Known for: Coffee roasting; Worker cooperatives
- Spouse: Maria Dijmphna Ververs
- Children: Augustin; Arnold; Marie Félicité Louise
- Parents: Augustin Gamél (father); Ane Marie Westenskov (mother)
- Relatives: Jean Henri Oluf 1812-1868 (brother); Victor Carl Christian 1815-1872 (brother)
- Awards: Order of the Dannebrog

Antoine Cyrille Frederik Gamél (11 May 1809 – 24 April 1879) was a Danish merchant and businessman. He is the namesake of the coffee roasting company A. G. Gamél.

== Early life ==
Antoine Cyrille Frederik Gamél was born on 11 May 1809 in Copenhagen. He was son of Ane Marie Westenskov (1774–1848) and French citizen Augustin Gamél (1770–1829). His father came to Copenhagen in 1805 to work as hairdresser for the Danish crown-prince Frederik and subsequently founded a business trading with colonial goods.

== Career ==
After secondary school, Gamél started as a merchant apprentice. Despite not finishing the apprenticeship before his father's death, he took care of the family business for his mother until he was allowed into the traders guild by Royal decree in 1834. The decree meant that he could take over the business in his own name in 1835 as A. G. Gamél. Gamél lost the trade with the Royal Court in 1839 with the death of King Frederik VI. Instead, he turned to roasting and selling coffee from Java, a business which eventually grew into the largest coffee business in Nordic countries and the largest seller of roasted Java coffee in Europe.

He was a member of the civil militia in Copenhagen until he retired in 1859 with the rank of major of the infantry and was awarded the Order of the Dannebrog by King Christian IX in 1875. Gamél was on the board of the society for Kindergartens in Copenhagen from 1868 and founding member of the board for the limited company under the workers association of 1860, which was created to build housing for the working class.

== Personal life ==
On 19 June 1838, Gamél married Maria Dijmphna Ververs. The ship SS Dijmphna, bought and fitted as an arctic explorer by Antoine and Maria's sons, was named in her honour and used for the 1882-83 expedition to the Kara Sea and Novaya Zemlja.
