= Henrik Krøyer Holme =

Island group of northeast Greenland

- Location within Greenland

Geography
- Location: Far NE Greenland
- Coordinates: 80°38′N 13°43′W
- Archipelago: Wandel Sea
- Total islands: 3
- Area: 9.9 km^{2} (3.8 sq mi)

Administration
- Denmark
- Zone: NE Greenland National Park

Demographics
- Population: 0

Henrik Krøyer Holme is a small group of uninhabited islands of Greenland within Northeast Greenland National Park. The area was formerly part of Avannaa, originally Nordgrønland ("North Greenland"), a former county of Greenland until 31 December 2008.

The Henrik Krøyer Holme group is an Important Bird Area where the ivory gull breeds.

== Geography ==
This cluster of small islands is located in the Wandel Sea off the coast of Amdrup Land. The waters around the islands are part of the North East Water polynya, a seasonal area of open water surrounded by ice.

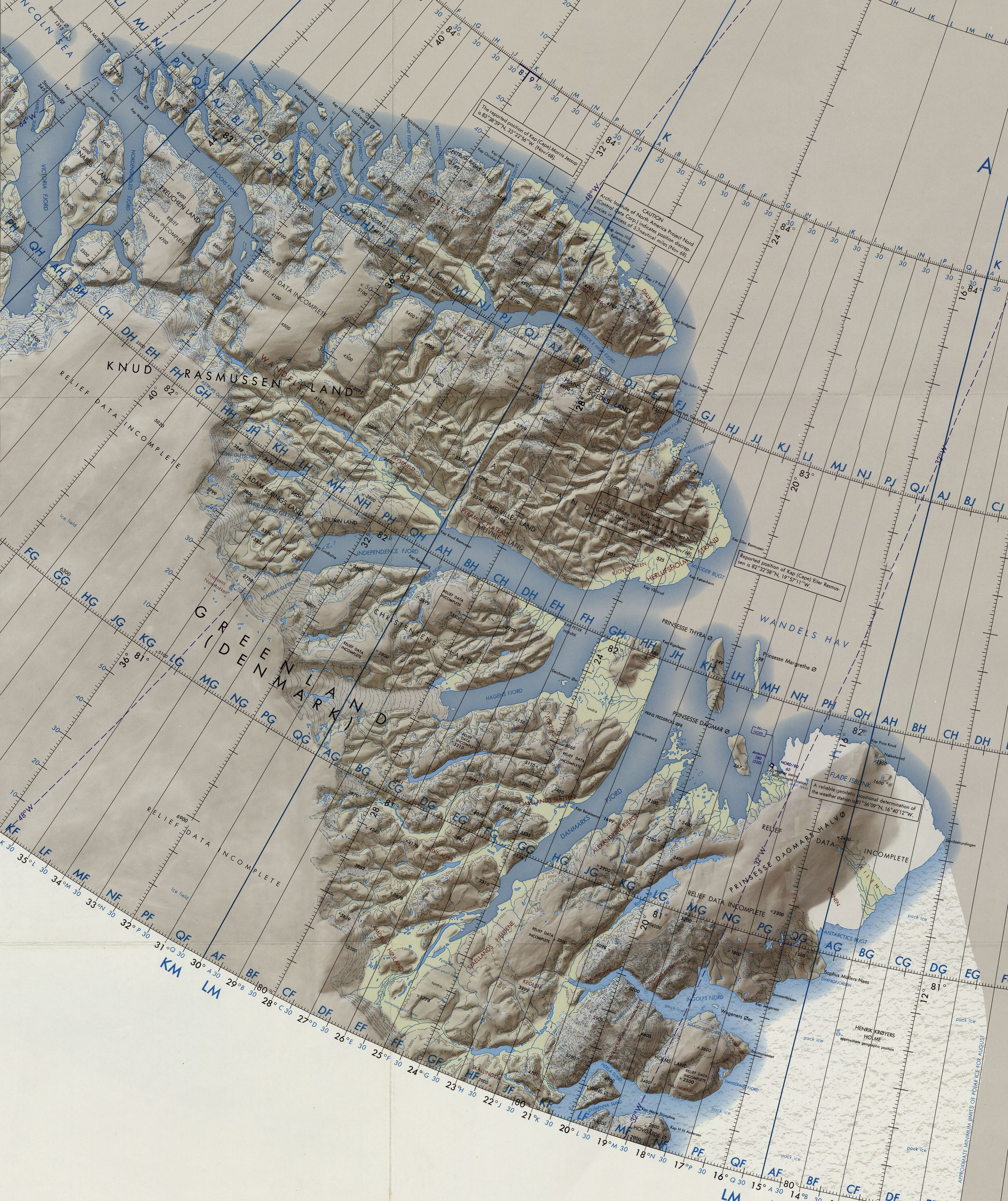
Map of Northeastern Greenland.

== See also ==
- List of islands of Greenland
