= Nioghalvfjerdsbræ =

Glacier in Greenland

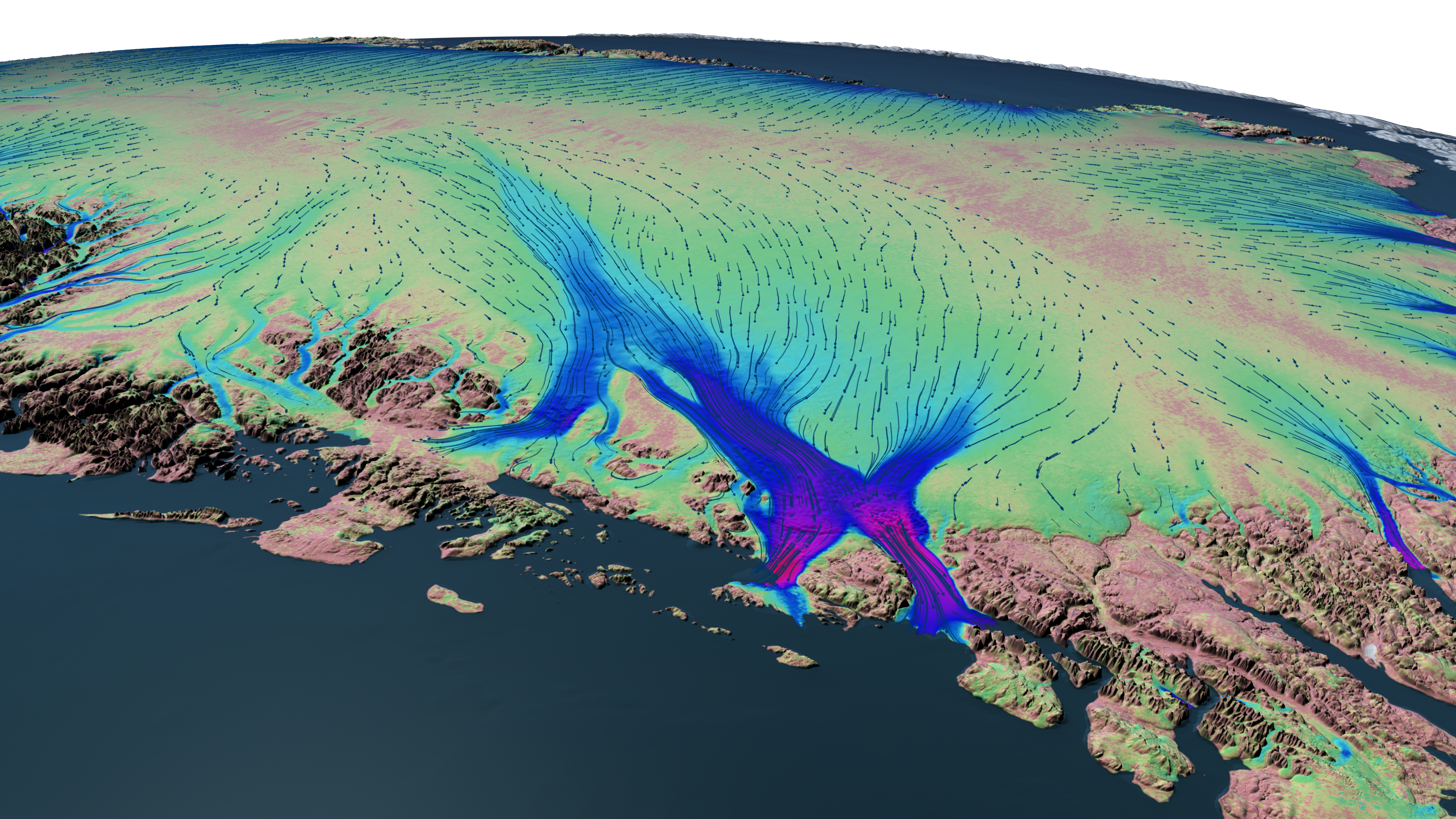
- Velocity flow over the Nioghalvfjerdsbræ

- Location within Greenland
- Location: Greenland
- Coordinates: 79°0′N 25°0′W
- Area: 103,314 km^{2} (39,890 sq mi)
- Length: 89 km (55 mi)
- Width: 20 km (12 mi)
- Terminus: Nioghalvfjerdsfjorden, Greenland Sea

Nioghalvfjerdsbræ (79°00′N 025°00′W), sometimes referred to as "79 N Glacier", is a large glacier located in King Frederick VIII Land, northeastern Greenland. It drains an area of 103,314 km^{2} (39,890 sq mi) of the Greenland Ice Sheet with a flux (quantity of ice moved from the land to the sea) of 14.3 km^{3} (3.4 cu mi) per year, as measured for 1996. The glacier has two calving fronts where the glacier meets the ocean, separated by Hovgaard Island. In July 2020, the northern offshoot, the Spalte Glacier broke away from Nioghalvfjerdsbrae and completely disintegrated.

== History ==
This glacier was named by the ill-fated Denmark expedition 1906-1908 because it lies at a latitude of 79°. The name had been meant to be temporary, but it acquired a new significance when it was deemed to be the place where expedition leader Ludvig Mylius-Erichsen, as well as cartographer Niels Peter Høeg Hagen, had died according to Jørgen Brønlund's diary.

Since 1990 Greenland's longest persistent supraglacial stream runs on the glacier, 73 km long in 2011, 71 km in 2017. The width of the stream remains relatively constant over most of the length ranging from 20 to 35 m.

In August 1997 the southern calving front retreated by 5 km with no significant upstream thinning.

== Geography ==
The terminus of the glacier is in the Nioghalvfjerd Fjord, south of the Dijmphna Sound. The fjord and the glacier form the southern limit of Crown Prince Christian Land. The glacier has had an 80 km long and 20 km wide floating tongue, widening toward its terminus north of Lambert Land.

Map of Northeastern Greenland

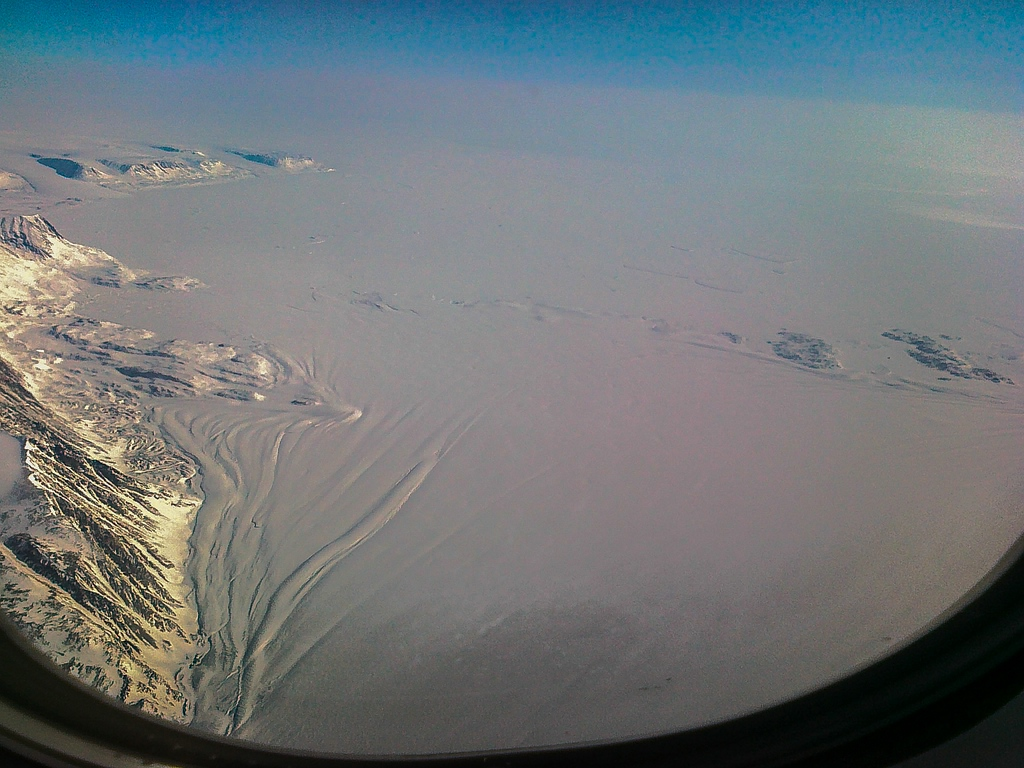
View of the terminus of the Nioghalvfjerdsbræ glacier with the southwestern end of Hovgaard Island and Cape Adolf Jensen

== See also ==
- List of glaciers in Greenland
- List of fjords of Greenland
- Hovgaard Island (Greenland)
