= Lynn Island =

Island in the Greenland Sea, Greenland

Lynn Ø
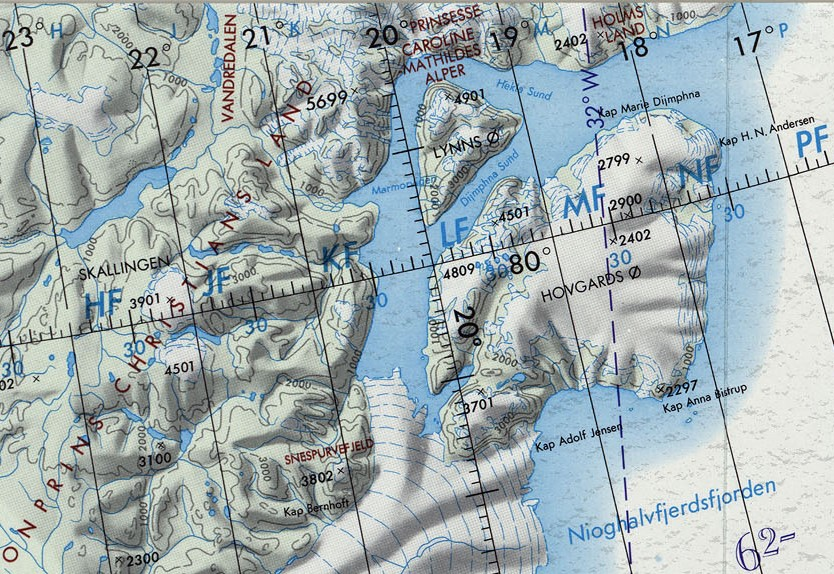

- Location within Greenland

Geography
- Location: Greenland Sea
- Coordinates: 80.12°N 19.22°W
- Area: 230.9 km^{2} (89.2 sq mi)

Administration
- Greenland
- Zone: Northeast Greenland National Park

Demographics
- Population: 0

Lynn Island (Danish: Lynn Ø) is an uninhabited island of the Greenland Sea, Greenland.

== History ==
The island was surveyed and named by the Danmark Expedition to the North-East Coast of Greenland 1906–1908. Expedition member Christian B. Thostrup recorded that it was named after a British shipping company based at Bridgeness.

== Geography ==
Lynn Island is a coastal island located west of the southward bend of the Dijmphna Sound with the Hekla Sound on its northern and western shore.

The island lies to the west of much larger Hovgaard Island and to the south of the Holm Land Peninsula. The island has an area of 230.9 km^{2} (89.2 sq mi) and has a shoreline of 65.7 km (40.8 mi).

Map of Northeastern Greenland.

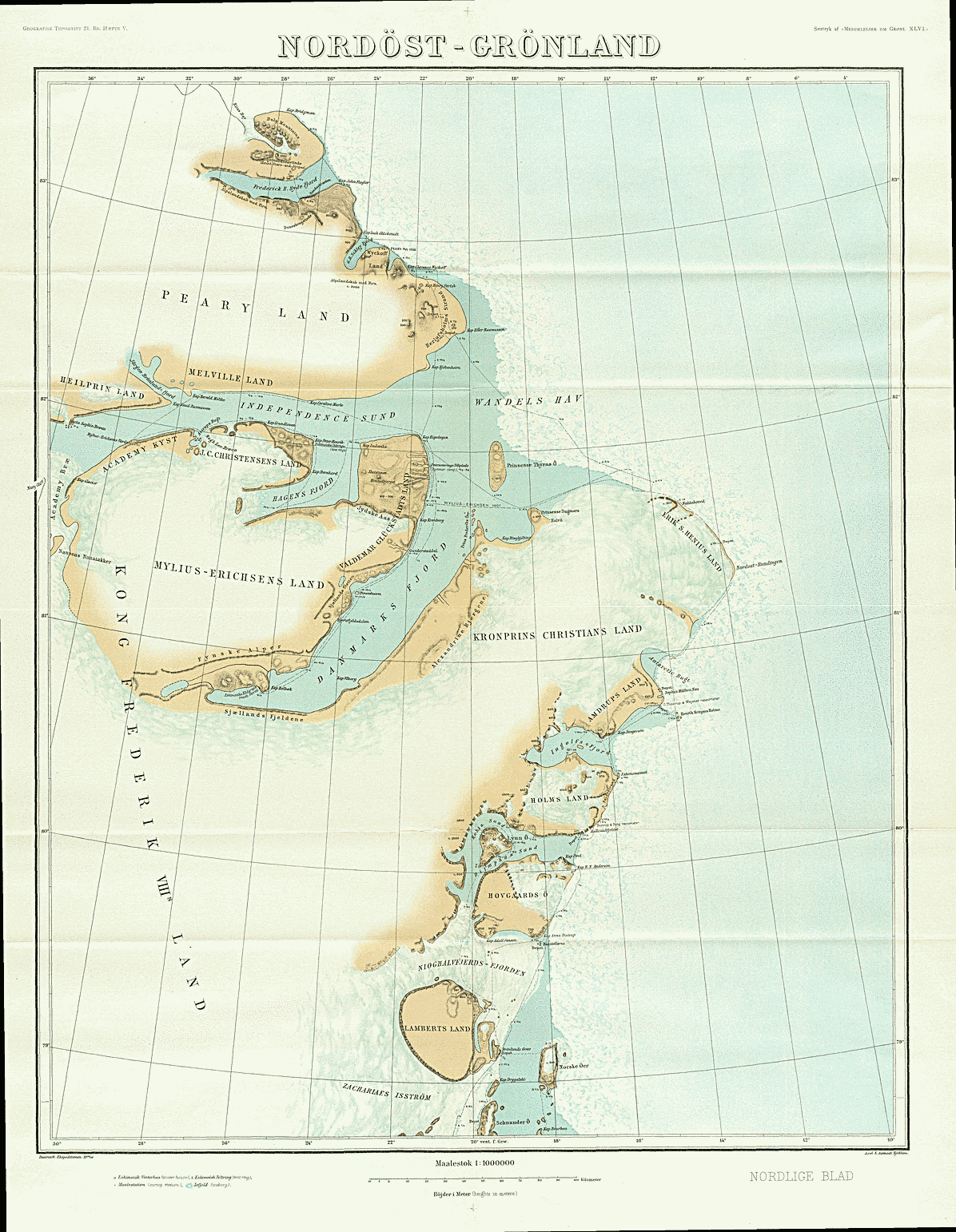
Johan Peter Koch's 1911 map of NE Greenland showing Lynn Island.

== See also ==
- List of islands of Greenland
