= Amdrup Land =

Peninsula in Greenland

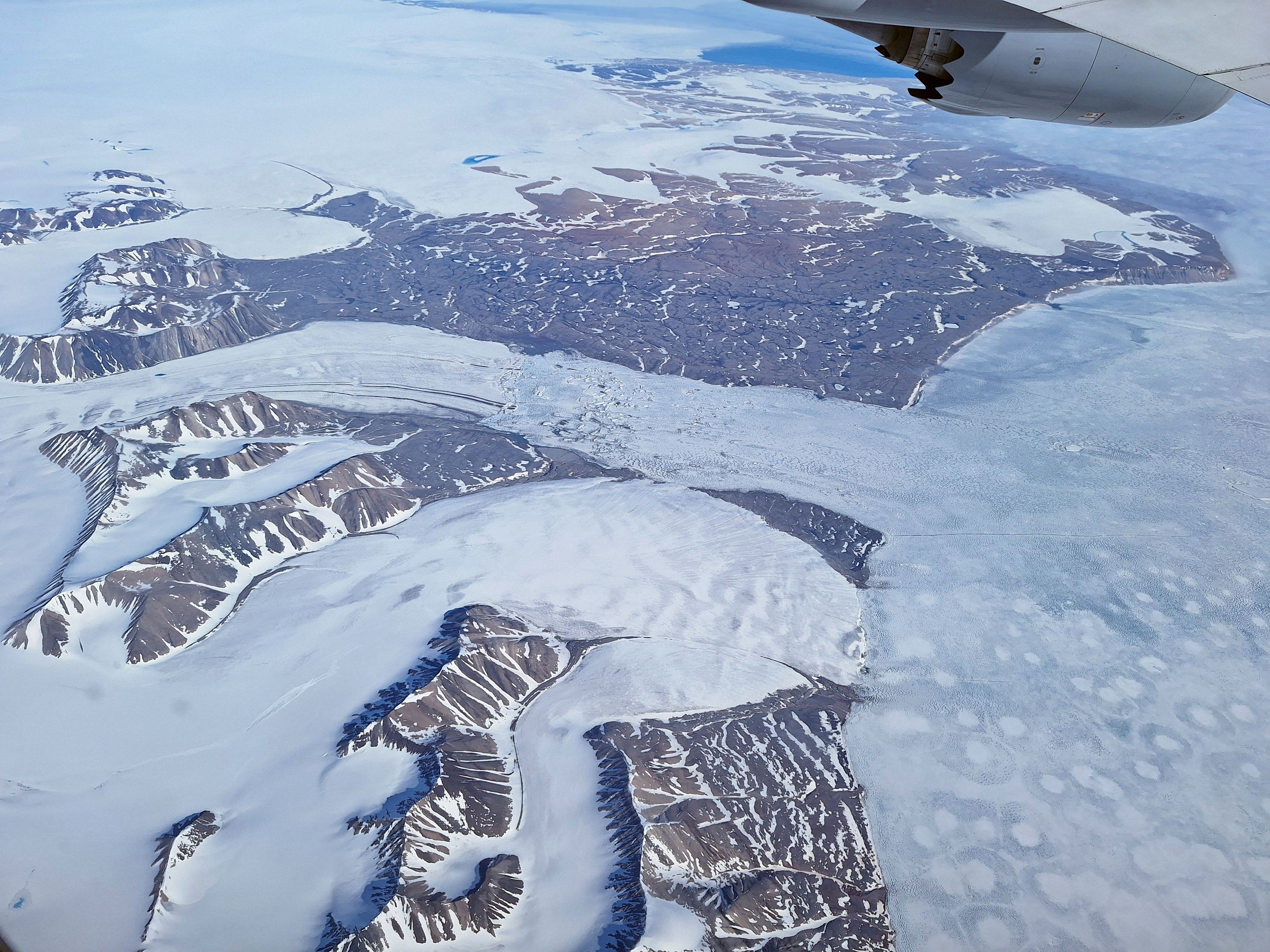
- Aerial photo of Amdrup Land and Ingolf Fjord (on the right) in July 2026, looking northeast

- Location within Greenland

Geography
- Location: East Greenland
- Coordinates: 80°47′N 15°22′W
- Adjacent to: Flade Isblink; Ingolf Fjord; Antarctic Bay; Greenland Sea
- Length: 100 km (60 mi)
- Width: 50 km (31 mi)
- Highest elevation: 590 m (1940 ft)
- Highest point: Unnamed

Administration
- Greenland (Denmark)
- Zone: NE Greenland National Park

Demographics
- Population: Uninhabited

Amdrup Land is a land area in the Crown Prince Christian Land peninsula, King Frederick VIII Land, northeastern Greenland. Administratively it belongs to the NE Greenland National Park area.

Numerous fossils of the Carboniferous and Palaeozoic periods have been found in Amdrup Land, including fossil algae and fishes.

== Geography ==
Amdrup Land is largely unglaciated. It is bound in the north by the large Flade Isblink ice cap, in the east by Antarctic Bay of the Greenland Sea and in the south by the Ingolf Fjord, on the other side of which rises Holm Land.

The Henrik Krøyer Holme island group lies off its southeastern point. To the northwest rise the Princess Elizabeth Alps.

== History ==
Amdrup Land was named by the 1906-1908 Denmark expedition after Georg Carl Amdrup, a member of the expedition committee.

The 1938–39 Mørkefjord expedition found numerous stone mounds which proved to be ancient Inuit meat caches at a place named Kødgravene, in the northeastern shore of Amdrup Land. Archaeological remains of an Inuit settlement were found at Sommerterrassen, north of Cape Jungersen in the SE coast.

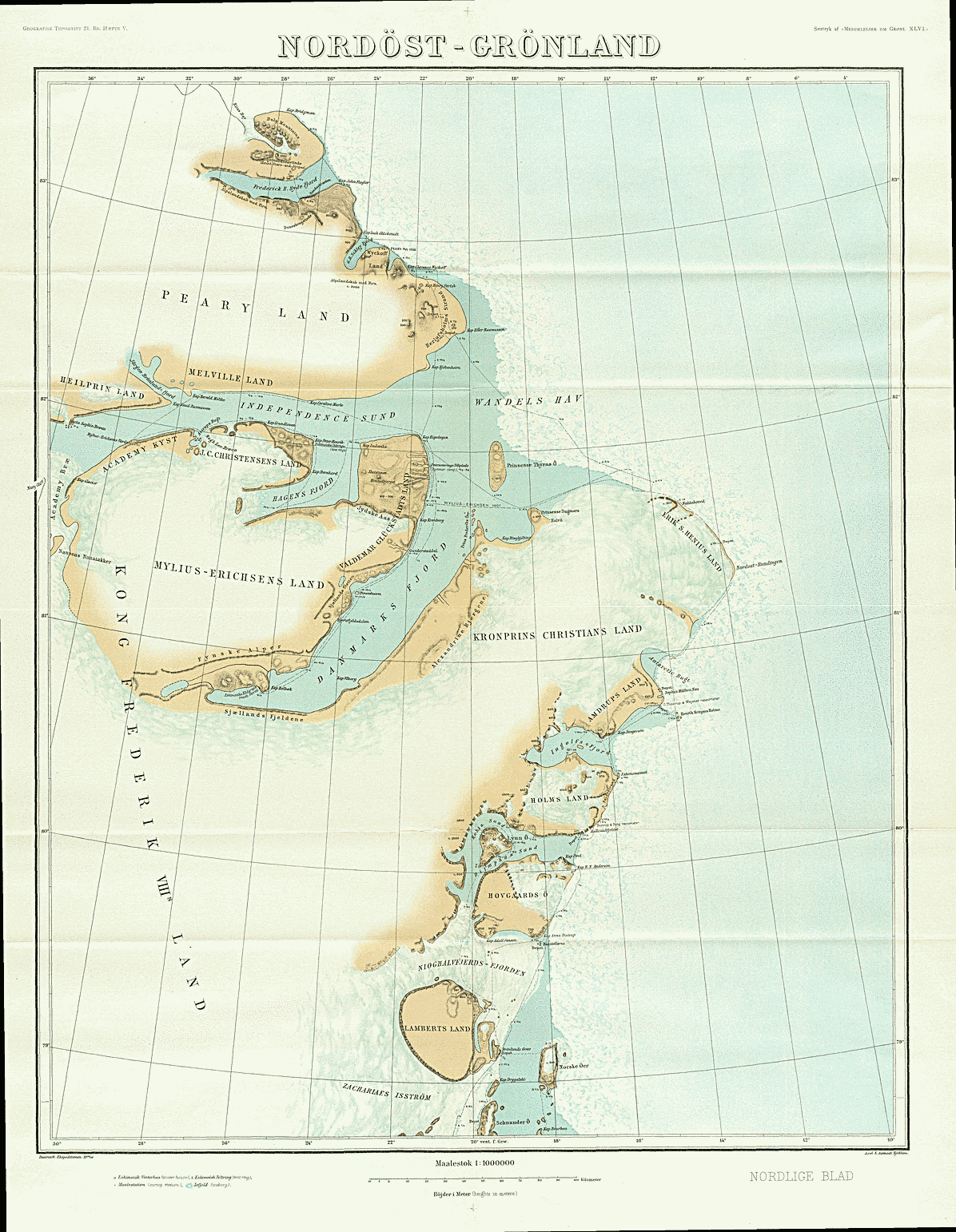
1911 Lauge Koch map of NE Greenland showing Amdrup Land.
