= Theo Holm =

Danish-American systematic botanist, agriculturalist and plant pathologist

Herman Theodor Holm (February 3, 1854 – December 26, 1932) was a Danish-American systematic botanist, agriculturalist and plant pathologist. His works dealt principally with plants from the Arctic and from the Rocky Mountains, mainly taxonomy and morphology. He published over 150 papers reflecting his research which included his series Studies on the Cyperaceae and Medicinal Plants of North America.

== Biography ==
Herman Theodor Holm was born in Copenhagen, Denmark. He studied botany at the University of Copenhagen under professor Eugenius Warming and graduated 1880. In 1882–1883, he participated in the expedition on board the Danish vessel Dijmphna (the Dijmphna expedition 1882-83) to the territory between Russia and the North Pole during the First International Polar Year. The ship was icebound for a period in the Kara Sea. He also explored the flora of West Greenland as assistant to Eugenius Warming on the Fylla expedition in 1884.

He emigrated to the U.S., landing in New York City on April 12, 1888. He soon was employed as assistant botanist by the U.S. National Museum. In 1893 when he received American citizenship. From 1893 to 1897, he was assistant pathologist with the United States Department of Agriculture (USDA). He obtained his Ph.D. in botany from the Catholic University of America in Washington D.C. in 1902. He then moved to the countryside of Brookland, DC and later in Clinton, Maryland and did assistant work as a botanist for the Smithsonian Institution and the USDA. Although a Lutheran, in 1932 he joined the faculty of the Catholic University of America, but died soon after.

== Honors ==
The small-reed species Calamagrostis holmii Lange is named for him.

== Selected scientific works ==
- Novaia-Zemlia’s Vegetation, særligt dens Phanerogamer. Dijmphna-Togtets zoologiske-botaniske udbytte (1885)
- Contributions to the knowledge of the germination of some North American plant (1891)
- Notes on the flowers of Anthoxanthum odoratum L. (1892)
- Some new anatomical characters for certain Gramine (1903)
- Commelinaceœ. Morphological and anatomical studies of the vegetative organs of some North and Central American species (1906)
- Contributions to the morphology, synonymy, and geographical distribution of arctic plants (1922)
- The vegetation of the alpine region of the Rocky Mountains in Colorado (1923)
- Hibernation and Rejuvenation, Exemplified by North American Herbs (American Midland Naturalist) (1925),Vol. 9 (9): 439-476, Vol. 9 (10): 477-512. The title probably alludes to the title of the first work on plant life-form, Om Skudbygning, Overvintring og Foryngelse [translated title: On shoot architecture, hibernation and rejuvenation] (1884) by Eugen Warming, Holm's former mentor in Copenhagen, who had died the year before. At the end of the second part, Holm gives a list of all his papers on life form - related morphology and anatomy of American plants, ordered by genus.

== Sources ==
- Woods, A.F. (1933) Herman Theodor Holm. Science 77 (1990): 183-184.
- Tucker, A.O., Poston, M.E. & Iltis, H.H. (1989) History of the LCU Herbarium, 1895-1986. Taxon 38 (2): 196-203.
