= Holm Land =

Peninsula in Northeast Greenland National Park, Greenland

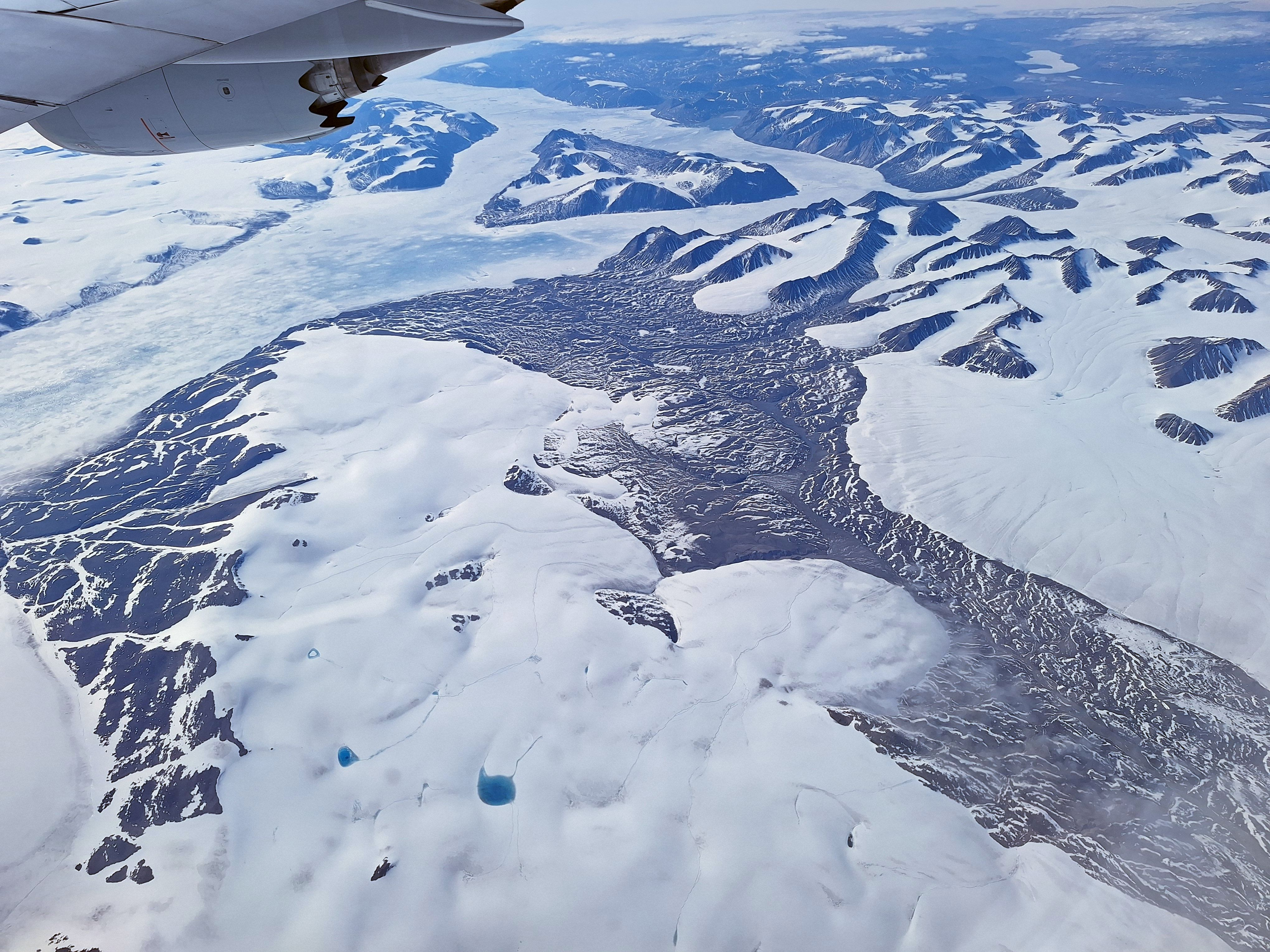
- Aerial photo in July 2026, looking southwest

- Location within Greenland

Geography
- Location: East Greenland
- Coordinates: 80°20′N 18°10′W
- Adjacent to: Ingolf Fjord; Greenland Sea; Hanseraq Fjord; Hekla Sound; Dijmphna Sound
- Length: 88 km (54.7 mi)
- Width: 42 km (26.1 mi)
- Highest elevation: 1,627 m (5338 ft)

Administration
- Greenland (Denmark)
- Zone: NE Greenland National Park

Holm Land (Danish: Holms Land), sometimes referred to as "Hahn Land", is a peninsula in King Frederick VIII Land, northeastern Greenland. Administratively it belongs to the NE Greenland National Park area.

This peninsula was named by the 1906-1908 Denmark expedition after Danish naval officer and Arctic explorer Gustav Frederik Holm.

== Geography ==
Holm Land is bounded in the north by the Ingolf Fjord, on the other side of which rises Amdrup Land, and in the south the Hekla Sound and the Dijmphna Sound. To the west it is attached to the mainland and to the east lies the Greenland Sea. Hanseraq Fjord is a small fjord in the eastern coast. To the south lie Lynn Island and larger Hovgaard Island. A great part of inner Holm Land is covered by an ice cap.

Eskimonæsset is the peninsula's northeasternmost point where there are archaeological remains of ancient Inuit dwellings found by the ill-fated Denmark Expedition.

Holm Land is mountainous, especially in its western part where the Princess Caroline Mathilde Alps (Prinsesse Caroline Mathilde Alper) run from north to south across the western end of the peninsula. The highest point reaches 1,627 m (5,338 ft) at 80°28′28″N 19°36′38″W.

Steep cliffs make up most of the southern shore. Mallemuk Mountain (Mallemukfjeldet) is a high plateau at the southeastern end with the most precipitous cliff section.

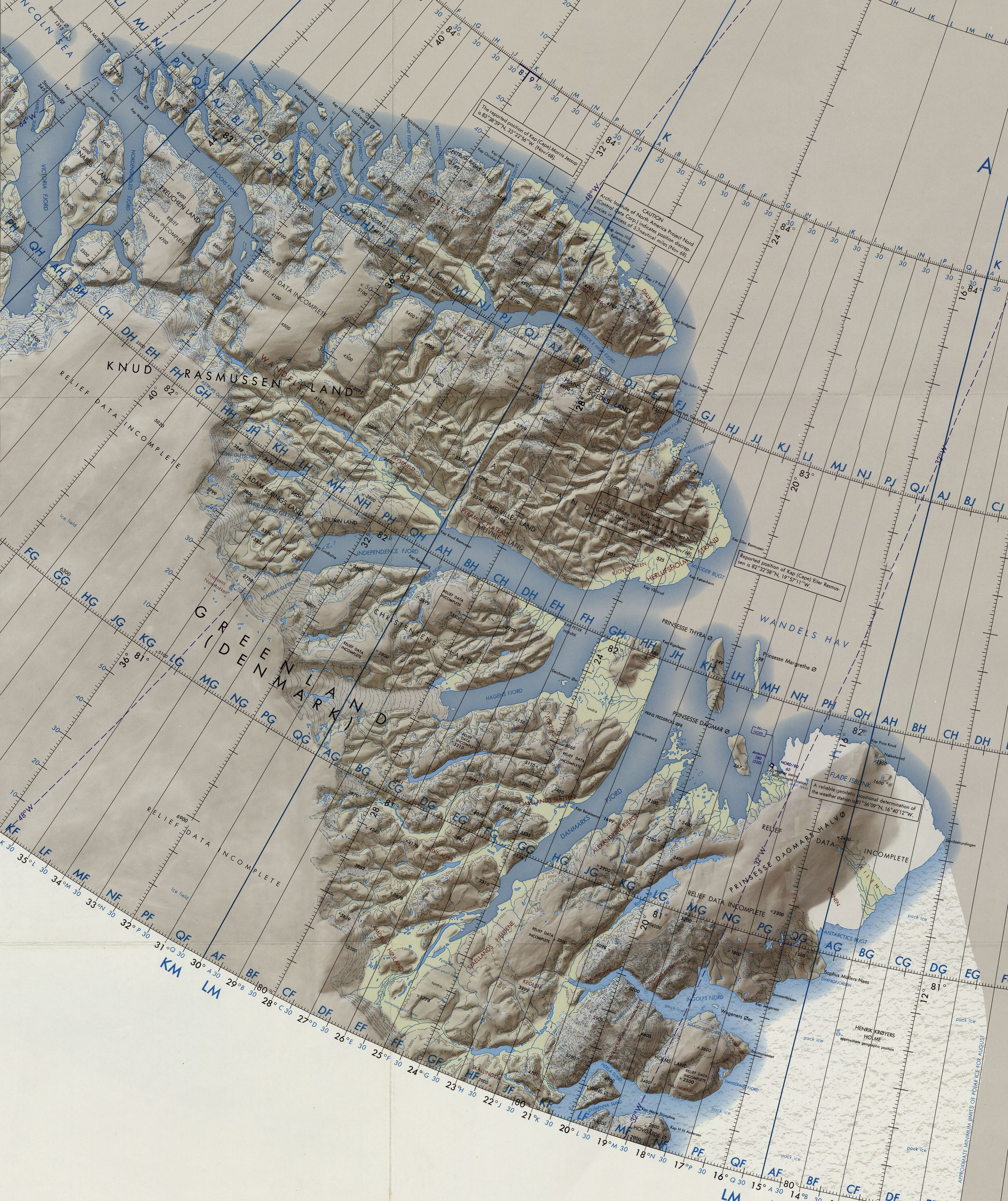
Map of Northeastern Greenland.

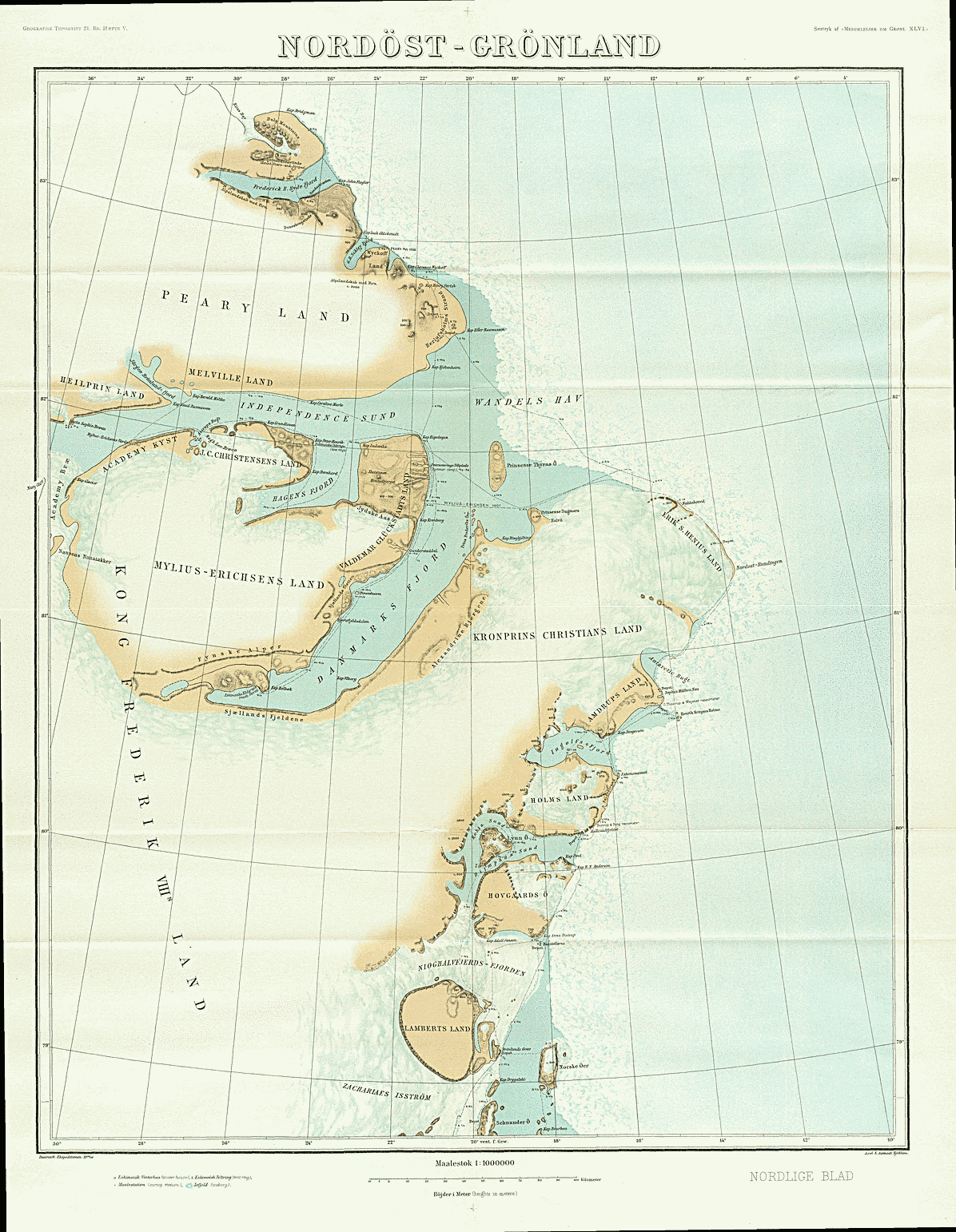
1911 Danish map of NE Greenland showing Holm Land (1911).
