= A. C. Gamél =

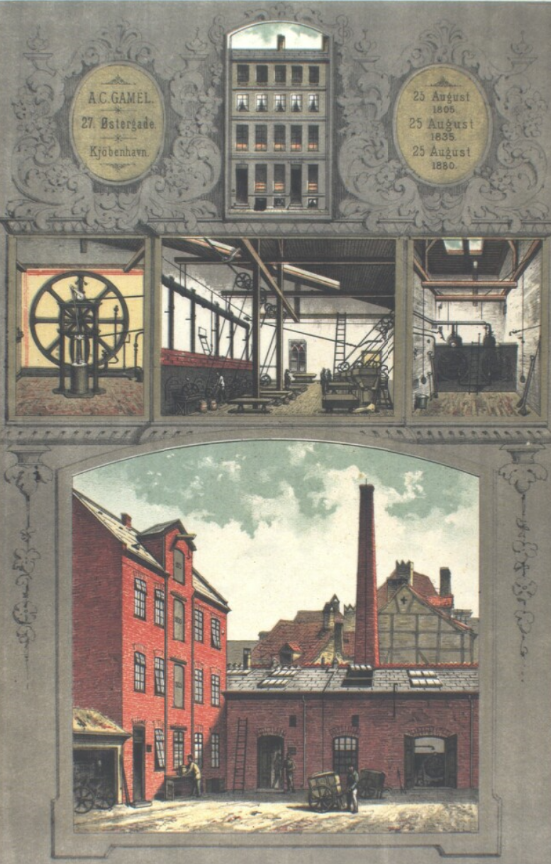
Advertisement for A. C. Gamél

A. C. Gamél was a coffee roasting company, wholesaler and retailer based in Copenhagen, Denmark.

== History ==
The company was founded on 25 August 1805 by Augustin Cyrille Gamél (1770-1829) when he opened a delicacy store at Østergade 20 (now No. 27) in Copenhagen. Gamél was originally from Provence. His store was at the time of its opening the only place in Copenhagen where it was possible to buy roasted coffee. The company gradually began to specialize in trading with coffee.

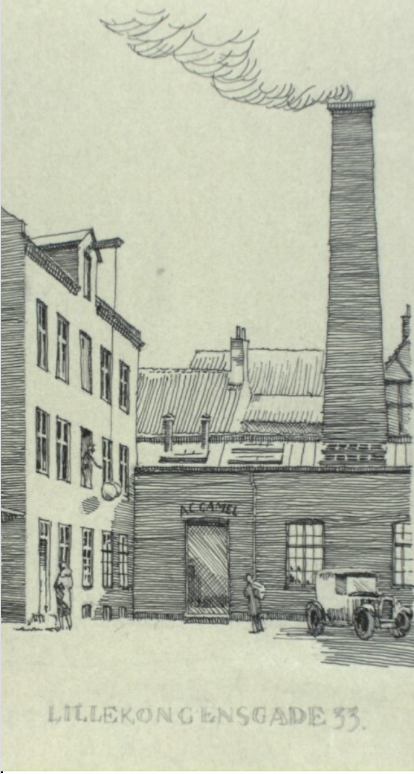
The coffee roastery in the courtyard

His son, Antoine Cyrille Gamél (1809-1879) managed the company on behalf of his mother until he became its owner in 1835.

Antoine Cyrille Gamél's sons, Augustin C. V. V. Gamél (1839-1904) and Arnold Gamél (born1848), took over the company after their father's death in 1879. Arnold Gamél left the company in 1907.

Cyril Gamél (born 1879), a son of Augustin Gamél, joined the company when his father died in 1904. He was its manager from 1907. The company closed in the 1940s.

== Location ==
The company was based at Østergade 27.

== See also ==
- Beauvais
