= Mallemuk Mountain =

Mountain in Greenland

- Mallemukfjeldet; Mallemukbjerg
- Location within Greenland

Highest point
- Elevation: 762 m (2,500 ft)
- Coordinates: 80°11′8″N 16°37′9″W

Geography
- Location: Holm Land, Greenland

Mallemuk Mountain (Danish: Mallemukfjeldet) is a mountain plateau with seaward cliffs in NE Greenland. Administratively it is part of the Northeast Greenland National Park zone.

This mountain was named by the ill-fated Denmark expedition after the numerous colonies of northern fulmars breeding in the cliffs.

== Geography ==
Mallemuk Mountain is located by the Dijmphna Sound in the southeastern shore of Holm Land, in the King Frederick VIII Land area of northeastern Greenland. The plateau is about 760 m (2,490 ft) in height and there are small glaciers on its sides, the Depot Glacier and the Mallemuk Glacier. Its cliffs are precipitous and rising steeply from the shore up to about 500 m (1,600 ft).

For former expeditions to remote NE Greenland Mallemuk Mountain was useful as a landmark for its conspicuous cliffs. The name, however, was used inconsistently and there was a confusion with nearby Depot Fjeld at 80°10′30″N 16°55′20″W. Although the sea in the area is permanently covered by fast ice, off the feet of the cliffs there is often open water.

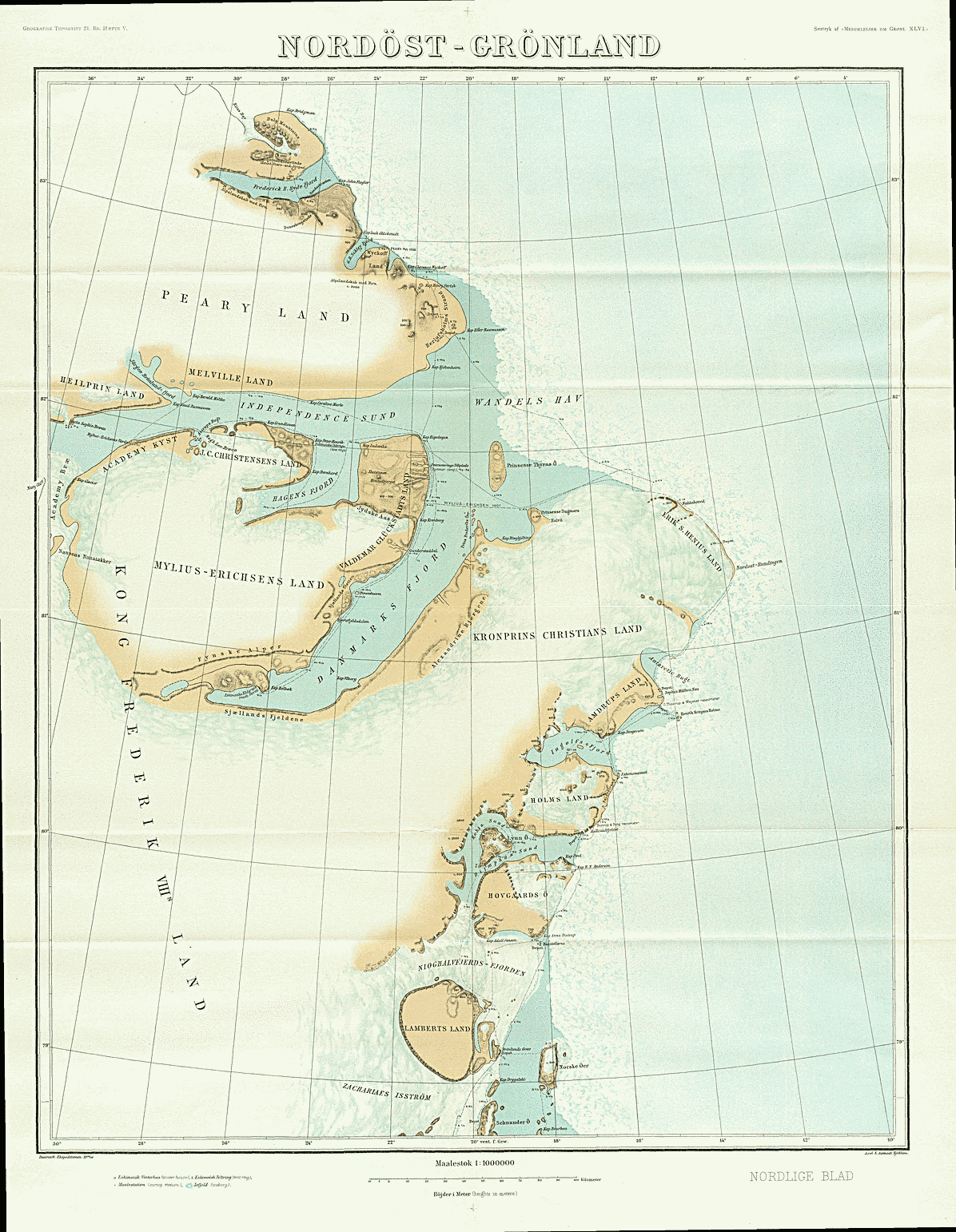
1911 German map of NE Greenland showing Mallemuk Mountain.

== See also ==
- List of mountains in Greenland
- Polynya
