= Dijmphna Sound =

Strait in Greenland

- Dijmphna Sund
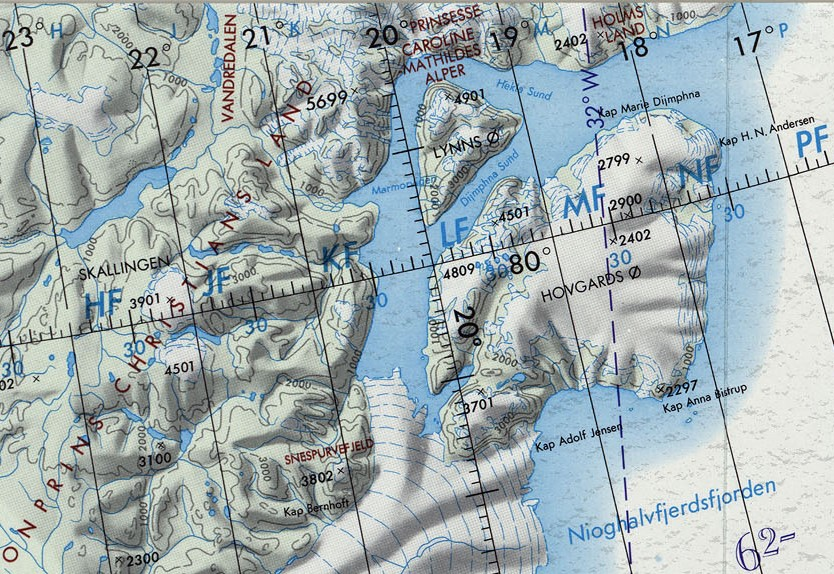

- Location within Greenland
- Location: NE Greenland
- Coordinates: 80°7′N 18°0′W
- Part of: Arctic Ocean
- Ocean/sea sources: Greenland Sea
- Basin countries: Greenland
- Max. length: 80 km (50 mi)
- Max. width: 10 km (6.2 mi)
- Frozen: Most of the year, except for a localized polynya
- Settlements: 0

The Dijmphna Sound (Danish: Dijmphna Sund) is a sound in King Frederick VIII Land, Northeast Greenland. Administratively it is part of the Northeast Greenland National Park zone.

== History ==
The sound was named by the 1906-1908 Denmark expedition after steamer Dijmphna, on which Danish Naval officer Andreas Peter Hovgaard attempted to reach and map the area to the north of the Taymyr Peninsula in 1882–1883, but ended up stuck in the Kara Sea pack ice.

A polynya forms at the foot of the steep cliffs of Mallemuk Mountain so that there is sometimes open water in that area, even in the winter.

== Geography ==
The sound is structurally a fjord forming a channel that runs roughly westwards between the southern shore of Holm Land by Mallemuk Mountain to the north and Cape H. N. Andersen, at the NE end of Hovgaard Island to the south. Its minimum width is 4 km.

Lynn Island is located about 30 km (19 mi) from the mouth of the Dijmphna Sound where it bends in a NE/SW direction. At Cape Marie Dijmphna, the Hekla Sound branches to the NW separating the shore of Lynn Island from the southwestern shore of Holm Land to the north and —bending roughly southward— with the Skallingen shore in the Greenland mainland to the west, joining again the Dijmphna Sound. Meanwhile, the sound bends further southward west of Hovgaard Island until it meets the Spalte Glacier flowing from the Nioghalvfjerd Fjord in the southwest. Cape Adolf Jensen lies on the southeastern side of the southern mouth of the sound.

Map of Northeastern Greenland

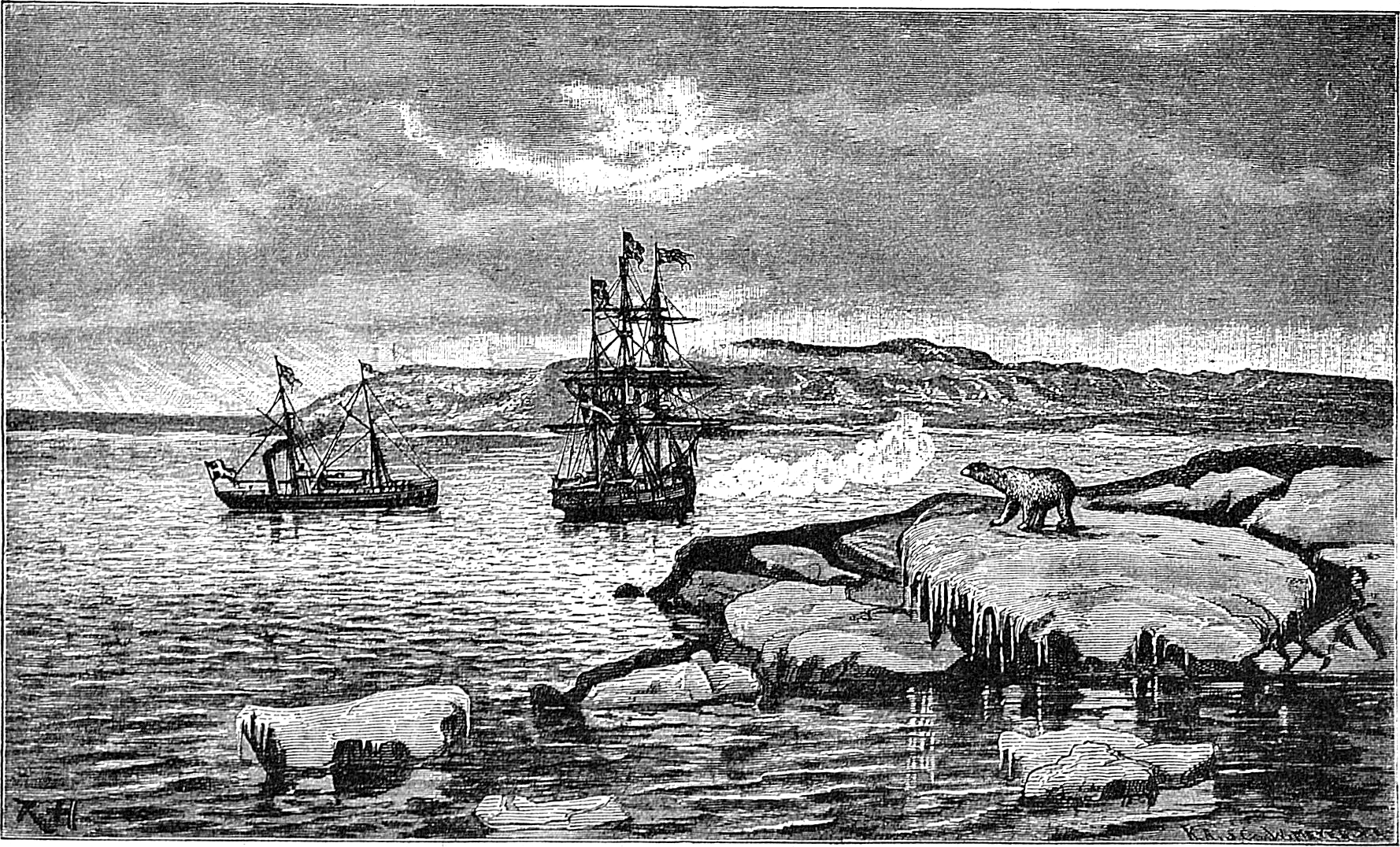
1907 Russian engraving of steamers Varna (left) and the Dijmphna, the vessel after which the sound was named.

== See also ==
- List of fjords of Greenland
