= Flade Isblink =

Ice cap in Greenland

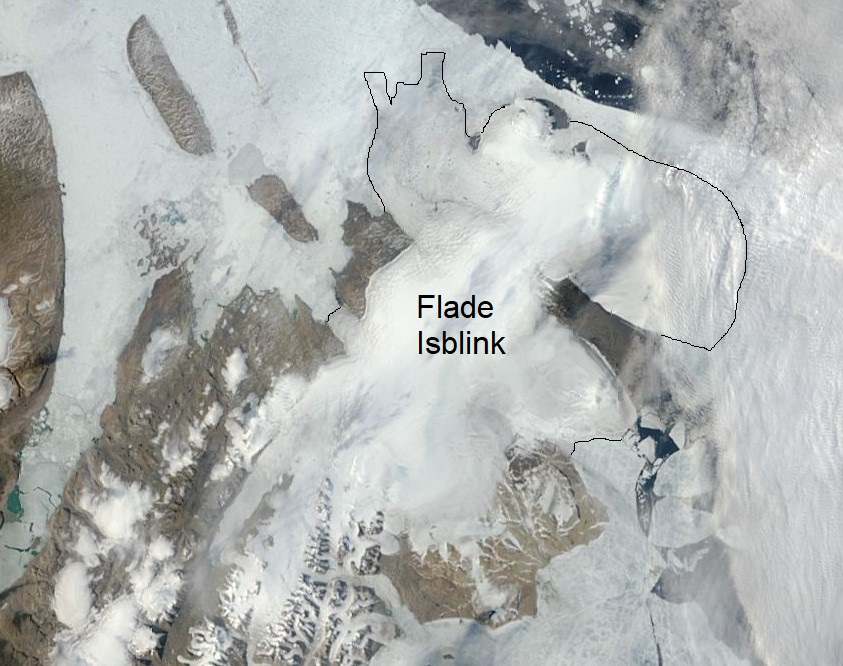
- Flade Isblink, NE Greenland

- Location within Greenland
- Type: Ice cap
- Location: Greenland
- Coordinates: 81°35′N 15°0′W
- Area: 8,500 km^{2} (3,300 sq mi)
- Length: 110 km (68 mi)
- Width: 55 km (34 mi)
- Thickness: 600 m (2,000 ft)

Flade Isblink is an ice cap on the Crown Prince Christian Land peninsula, King Frederick VIII Land, NE Greenland.

Station Nord, the only inhabited place in the region, lies to the northwest, off the ice cap area.

== History ==
The Flade Isblink was named by Lauge Koch in 1933. He was the first to map the area in the course of survey flights during the 1931–34 Three-year expedition to East Greenland.

== Geography ==
This large and flat ice cap is separated from the Greenland ice sheet and is the largest independent ice cap in Greenland. It is located between the Wandel Sea to the north and Amdrup Land and Antarctic Bay to the south. Romer Lake and the Princess Elizabeth Alps extend southwestwards at the western end and to the east lies the Fram Strait and the Greenland Sea. The ice cap covers most of the northern part of Crown Prince Christian Land and is about 8,500 km^{2} (3,300 sq mi) in area. The underlying bedrock is roughly 100 m (330 ft) above sea level.

The Flade Isblink has two ice domes, the North Dome and the larger South Dome. Kilen is a roughly triangular stretch of unglaciated flat land in the eastern shore with its apex in the ice cap between the two domes. The northern section of the ice cap is drained by two outlet glaciers flowing in a roughly northwestern direction. The northeastern corner of Greenland, Nordostrundingen, extends into the sea at the eastern end.

Map of Crown Prince Christian Land's northern half.

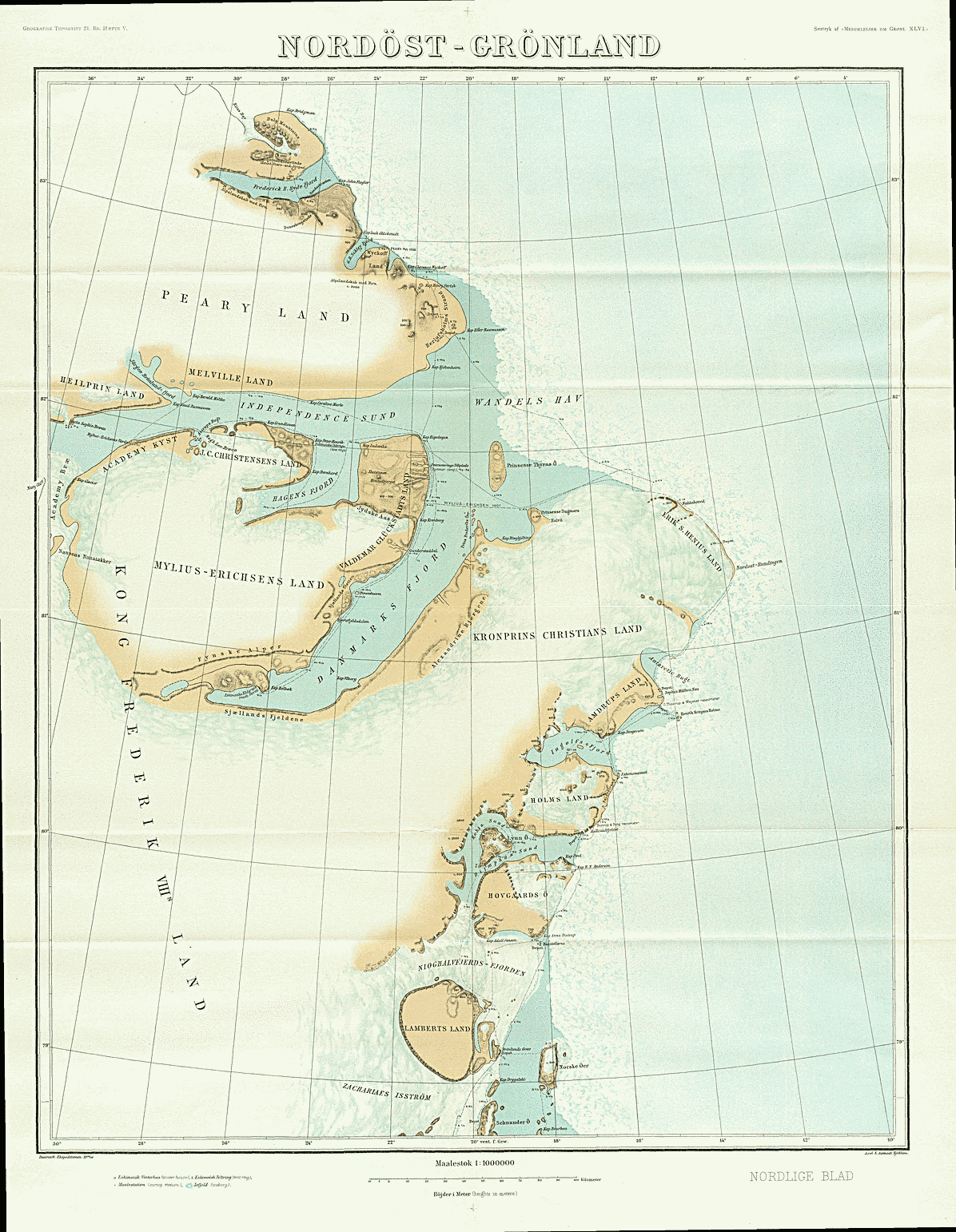
Johan Peter Koch's 1911 map of NE Greenland showing Crown Prince Christian Land.

== See also ==
- List of glaciers in Greenland
