= Danmarkshavn =

Weather station in Greenland

Coordinates: 76°46′N 18°40′W

Location of Danmarkshavn within Northeast Greenland National Park

Danmarkshavn (Denmark's Harbour) is a small weather station located in Dove Bay, on the northeastern shore of the Germania Land Peninsula, in Northeast Greenland National Park, Greenland.

== History ==
The location was chosen as a suitable winter harbor by the Denmark expedition in 1906 for their ship Danmark. It became the main base of the expedition, from where sledge journeys and scientific observations were carried out.

== Description ==
The permanent population of the base is six. Danmarkshavn is also known as the northernmost location on the coast of the Greenland Sea that non-icebreaking vessels can pass through. Therefore, it is resupplied by cargo ship in August every other year; thus the population increases somewhat for a brief time every other August. The ice situation varies, and some years it is not possible to reach the station, other years it is ice-free further north. It is operated by TELE-POST Greenland, a telecommunications company. Danmarkshavn has a short airstrip (ICAO: BGDH).

The station is jointly funded by countries that have ratified the Agreement on the Joint Financing of Certain Air Navigation Services In Greenland.

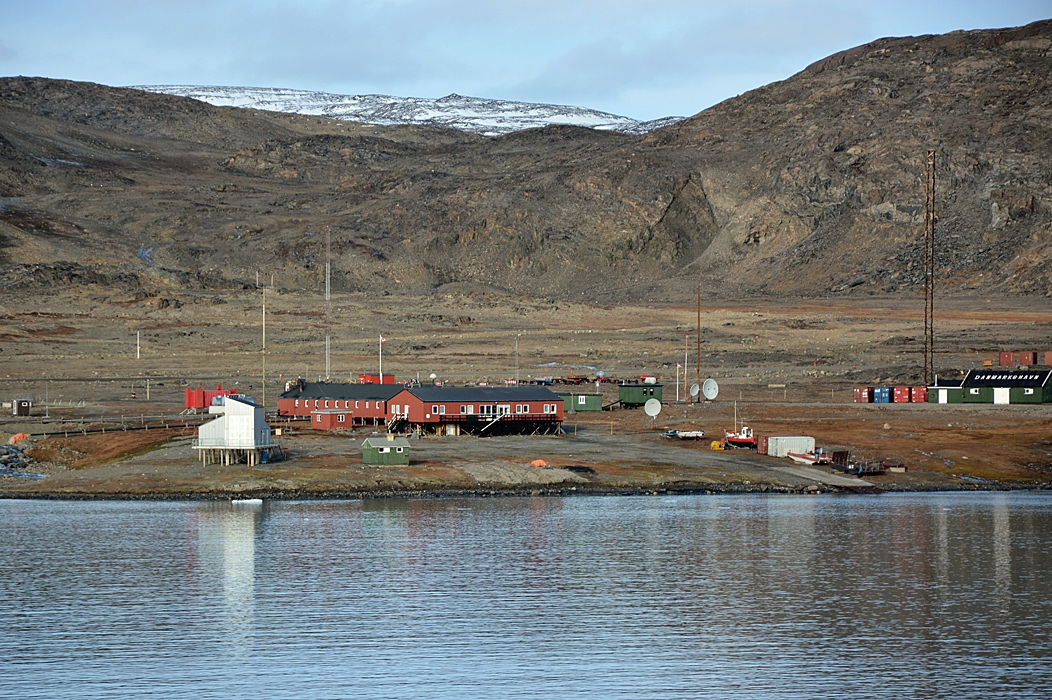
Danmarkshavn, September 2013

== Climate ==
Danmarkshavn has a cold tundra climate (Köppen climate classification ET), and hence it has long, cold winters. July and August are the warmest months, with average temperatures just a few degrees above freezing.

Climate data for Danmarkshavn (normals 1991-2020, extremes 1958-2020)
Month	Jan	Feb	Mar	Apr	May	Jun	Jul	Aug	Sep	Oct	Nov	Dec	Year
Record high °C (°F)	4.5 (40.1)	2.1 (35.8)	0.3 (32.5)	3.8 (38.8)	11.8 (53.2)	17.1 (62.8)	19.8 (67.6)	19.7 (67.5)	8.6 (47.5)	4.8 (40.6)	2.4 (36.3)	3.8 (38.8)	19.8 (67.6)
Mean daily maximum °C (°F)	−17.2 (1.0)	−18.0 (−0.4)	−18.3 (−0.9)	−11.8 (10.8)	−3.4 (25.9)	4.4 (39.9)	7.7 (45.9)	6.0 (42.8)	−0.7 (30.7)	−9.1 (15.6)	−13.6 (7.5)	−16.6 (2.1)	−7.5 (18.4)
Daily mean °C (°F)	−21.4 (−6.5)	−22.2 (−8.0)	−22.2 (−8.0)	−15.9 (3.4)	−6.4 (20.5)	1.5 (34.7)	4.4 (39.9)	3.2 (37.8)	−2.8 (27.0)	−11.9 (10.6)	−17.2 (1.0)	−20.6 (−5.1)	−11.0 (12.3)
Mean daily minimum °C (°F)	−25.8 (−14.4)	−26.9 (−16.4)	−27.0 (−16.6)	−21.1 (−6.0)	−9.9 (14.2)	−1.3 (29.7)	1.3 (34.3)	0.3 (32.5)	−5.4 (22.3)	−14.8 (5.4)	−20.8 (−5.4)	−24.9 (−12.8)	−14.7 (5.6)
Record low °C (°F)	−44.4 (−47.9)	−43.6 (−46.5)	−45.0 (−49.0)	−39.3 (−38.7)	−26.0 (−14.8)	−12.8 (9.0)	−7.0 (19.4)	−8.2 (17.2)	−17.6 (0.3)	−31.0 (−23.8)	−36.3 (−33.3)	−41.1 (−42.0)	−45.0 (−49.0)
Average precipitation mm (inches)	30.9 (1.22)	21.0 (0.83)	21.0 (0.83)	13.2 (0.52)	7.7 (0.30)	4.1 (0.16)	13.6 (0.54)	20.9 (0.82)	19.7 (0.78)	17.7 (0.70)	19.1 (0.75)	20.8 (0.82)	209.7 (8.27)
Average precipitation days (≥ 1.0 mm)	5.1	4.3	4.6	3.2	1.9	1.1	3.0	3.5	3.6	3.8	4.2	4.3	42.6
Average relative humidity (%)	71.9	69.0	68.9	69.0	76.9	77.7	77.5	76.6	72.7	71.4	69.5	68.4	72.5
Mean monthly sunshine hours	0	11	131	274	368	341	376	272	168	67	0	0	2,008
Percentage possible sunshine	0.0	11.1	37.1	47.5	49.5	47.4	50.5	39.1	39.7	31.0	0.0	0.0	29.4
Source: Danish Meteorological Institute

== See also ==
- List of research stations in the Arctic
