= Hovgaard Island (Greenland) =

Island in Greenland

Native name: Hovgaard Ø
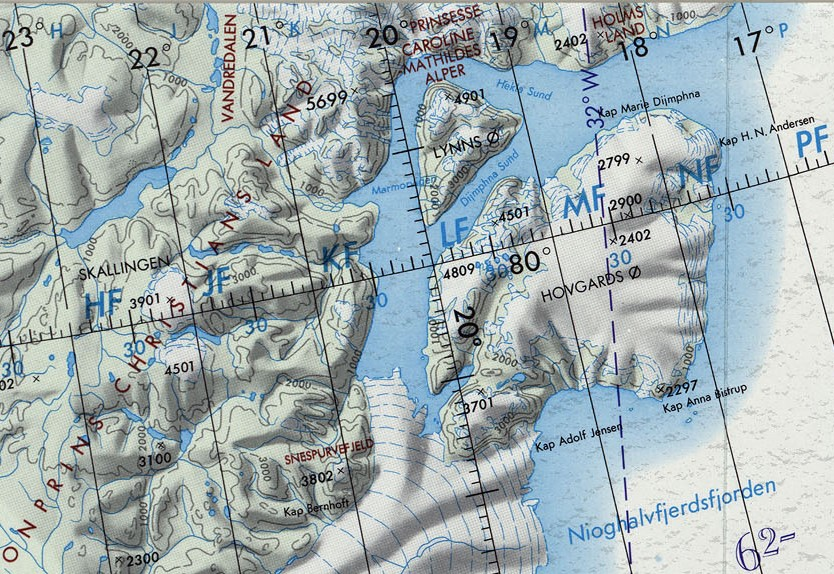

- Location of Hovgaard Island in Greenland
- Interactive map of Hovgaard Island
- Etymology: Named after polar explorer Andreas Hovgaard

Geography
- Location: Greenland Sea
- Coordinates: 79°54′N 18°30′W
- Area: 1,692 km^{2} (653 sq mi)
- Area rank: 7th largest in Greenland
- Length: 60 km (37 mi)
- Width: 42 km (26.1 mi)
- Highest elevation: 1,086 m (3563 ft)

Administration
- Greenland
- Unincorporated area: Northeast Greenland National Park

Demographics
- Population: 0 (2021)
- Pop. density: 0/km^{2} (0/sq mi)
- Ethnic groups: none

Hovgaard Island (Danish: Hovgaard Ø) is a large uninhabited island of the Greenland Sea, Greenland. The island was named after Andreas Hovgaard, a polar explorer and officer of the Danish Navy who led an expedition to the Kara Sea on steamship Dijmphna in 1882–83.

Polar climate prevails in Hovgaard Island. The average annual temperature in the area is -17 °C. The warmest month is July when the average temperature reaches -2 °C and the coldest is February when the temperature sinks to -29 °C.

== Geography ==
Hovgaard Island is a coastal island located to the south of the Holm Land Peninsula. To the west, further inshore, lies smaller Lynn Island and to the east and the southeast the Greenland Sea. The Dijmphna Sound limits the island to the west and north, and to the southwest lies the mouth of the Nioghalvfjerd Fjord of the Nioghalvfjerdsbrae glacier.

The island has a length of 60 km and a width of 42 km. Part of the interior is covered by an ice cap.

Map of Northeastern Greenland.

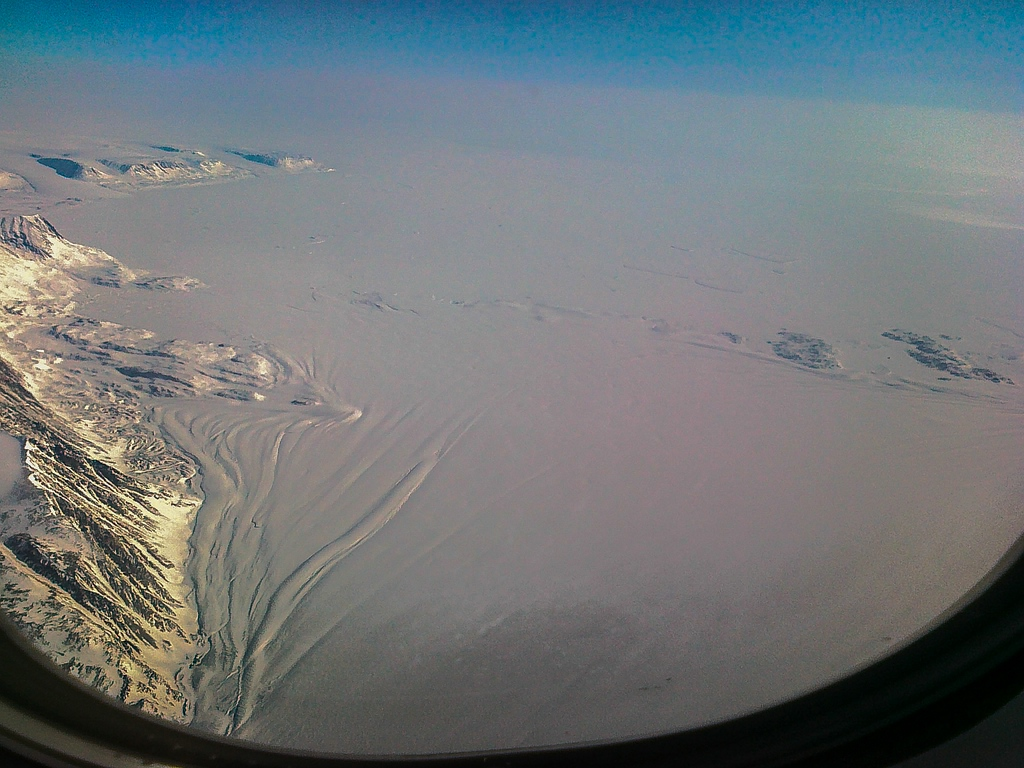
View of the terminus of the Nioghalvfjerdsbrae glacier with the southwestern end of Hovgaard Island and Cape Adolf Jensen.

== History ==
Hovgaard Island was explored and named by the ill-fated Denmark Expedition to the North-East Coast of Greenland in 1906–1908. The northwestern coast of the island was surveyed by Alfred Wegener in 1907, who at that time put Lynn Island on the map for the first time in history.

In 1910 Ejnar Mikkelsen and Iver Iversen (1884–1968), two members of the Danish Alabama Expedition struggled against the cold and famine on the island. Mikkelsen wrote the following about this bleak, inhospitable place:

... and the name Hovgaard Island will stay with us forever connected with hunger, deprivation, cold and distress.

== See also ==
- List of islands of Greenland
- Ejnar Mikkelsen
