= Nordostrundingen =

Cape in Northeast Greenland National Park, Greenland

Coordinates: 81°26′25″N 11°29′22″W

Nordøstrundingen amongst the extreme points of Greenland

Nordostrundingen (Danish: Nordostrundingen, Northeastern rounding, in English Northeast Foreland), is a headland located at the northeastern end of Greenland. Administratively it is part of the Northeast Greenland National Park.

This headland was named by the Denmark expedition 1906–1908. It is an inconspicuous point where the ice slope of the Flade Isblink meets the frozen sea.

== Easterly point ==
At 11°19'W it is the most easterly point of land relative to either of the Americas (North and South America). Nordøstrundingen is further east than three countries in Africa and even further east than the westernmost point in Europe (excluding the Azores), which is Látrabjarg in Iceland. It is only 1° 49′ from the westernmost point of the European mainland which is in Portugal.

Greenland is not part of North America politically, which leads some people to assert that the most easterly point of the continent is the easternmost point in Canada − Cape Spear located at 52°37'W near St. John's, Newfoundland. However, both of these headlands are located on islands on the North American continental shelf; neither is located on the continental mainland.

Semisopochnoi Island, Alaska is in the eastern hemisphere at 179°46'E and thus is the easternmost point in North America by longitude. Cape St. Charles on the Labrador Peninsula is the easternmost point of continental North America.
