= Nioghalvfjerdsfjorden =

Fjord in Greenland

- Location in Greenland
- Location: Arctic
- Coordinates: 79°33′N 21°00′W
- Ocean/sea sources: Greenland Sea
- Basin countries: Greenland

Nioghalvfjerdsfjorden is a fjord located in King Frederick VIII Land, in Northeast Greenland National Park of northeastern Greenland. It is located at latitude 79° N (hence the name, which in Danish means "the fjord of seventy-nine") between Lambert Land and Hovgaard Island. The fjord was named by the Denmark expedition in April 1907. The 79° North Glacier, also called Nioghalvfjerdsbræ, drains into this fjord. The uninhabited Tobias Island is located 80 km east of the fjord.

In September 2020, satellite imagery showed that a big chunk of ice shattered into many small pieces from the last remaining ice shelf in Nioghalvfjerdsfjorden.

== See also ==
- List of fjords of Greenland
