= Denmark expedition =

1906-1908 Expedition to northeastern Greenland

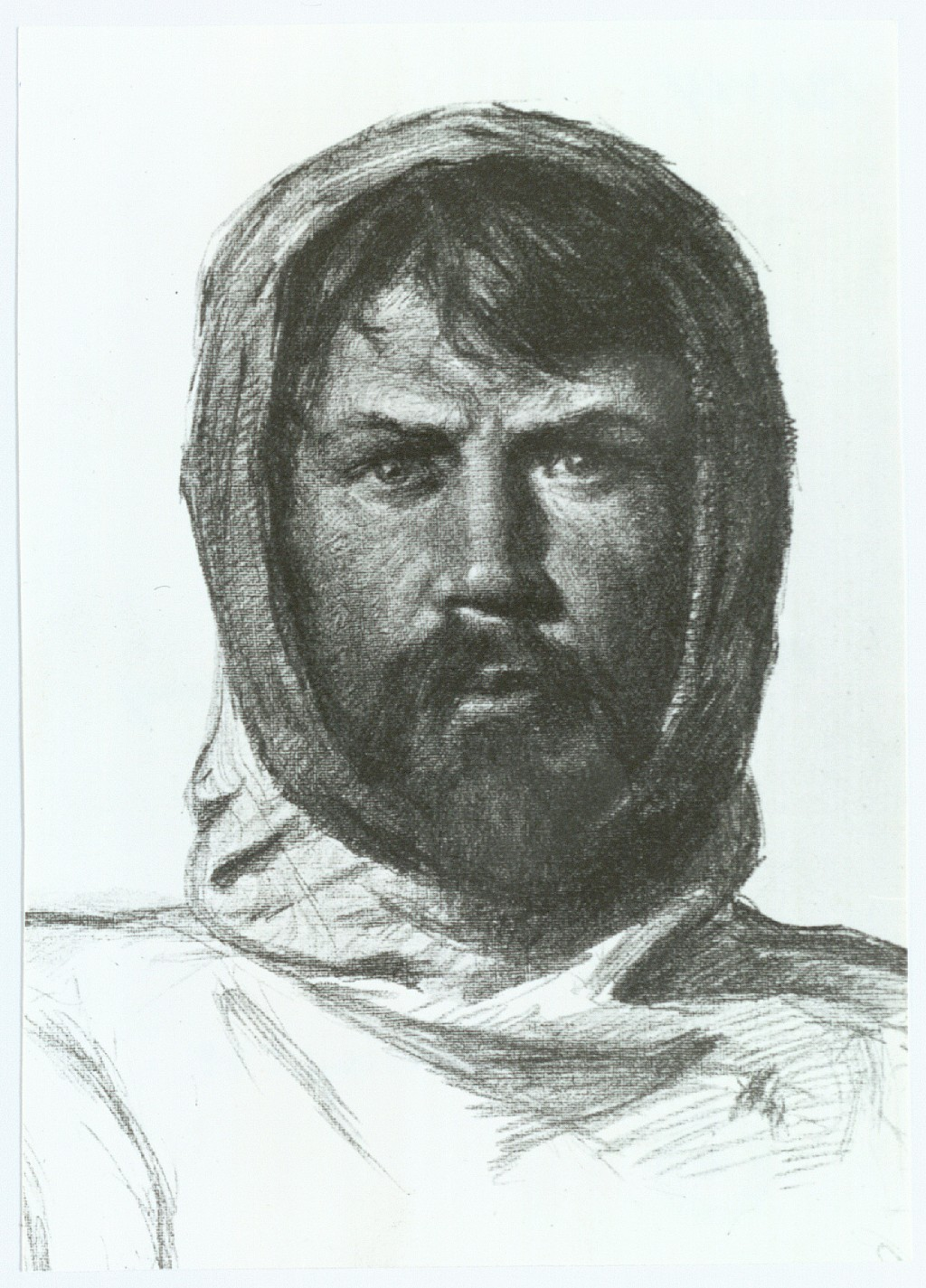
Expedition leader Ludvig Mylius-Erichsen

The Denmark expedition (Danish: Danmark-ekspeditionen), also known as the Denmark Expedition to Greenland's Northeast Coast and the Danmark Expedition after the ship's name, was an expedition to northeastern Greenland in 1906–1908.

Despite being overshadowed by the deaths under unusual circumstances of three of the expedition's leading members (Ludvig Mylius-Erichsen (1872–1907), Niels Peter Høeg Hagen (1877–1907), and Jørgen Brønlund (1877–1907)), the Denmark expedition was not a failure. It achieved its main cartographic objectives and succeeded in exploring the vast region, drawing accurate charts of formerly unexplored coastlines and fjords, naming numerous geographic features, and gathering a wealth of scientific data.

== Goals ==
The two-year expedition was conceived and led by Ludvig Mylius-Erichsen, who had previously led the 'Literary Expedition' to Northwest Greenland together with Knud Rasmussen in 1902–1904. The main target of the Denmark expedition was to map the last blank sections of the coastline of northeastern Greenland, between Cape Bridgman, near Robert Peary's easternmost geographic exploration in the north, and Cape Bismarck, the northernmost point reached by Carl Koldewey in the east. Beginning in the 1700s Greenland had slowly been mapped section by section, but the harsh climate in the far northeast and the difficult ice conditions off the shore had prevented the cartography of the vast zone.

The expedition aimed to gather scientific information on the unexplored area during a period of two years, including information on any remaining Northeast-Greenland Inuit, last seen by Royal Navy Captain Douglas Clavering in 1823 further south down the coast in Clavering Island.

The strategy of the expedition was to cross the sea ice barrier on the east coast of Greenland, sail with a ship as far north as possible, find a safe anchorage, establish a base with a meteorological station, and then go further north on dogsleds along the coastal ice. After the last unmapped coast of Greenland had been explored, which Mylius-Erichsen deemed could be done in a year, the expedition would move south to further explore the Kaiser Franz Joseph Fjord. Time permitting, the expedition would also attempt a westward crossing of the inland ice.

In addition, Robert Peary's claim that a channel running from east to west separated northernmost Greenland from the mainland further south – the (non-existent) so-called "Peary Channel" – was to be investigated.

A committee of authorities on Greenland, including Gustav Frederik Holm, Carl Ryder, Georg Carl Amdrup and Thomas Vilhelm Garde, advised Mylius-Erichsen on the preparation of the expedition.

== History ==
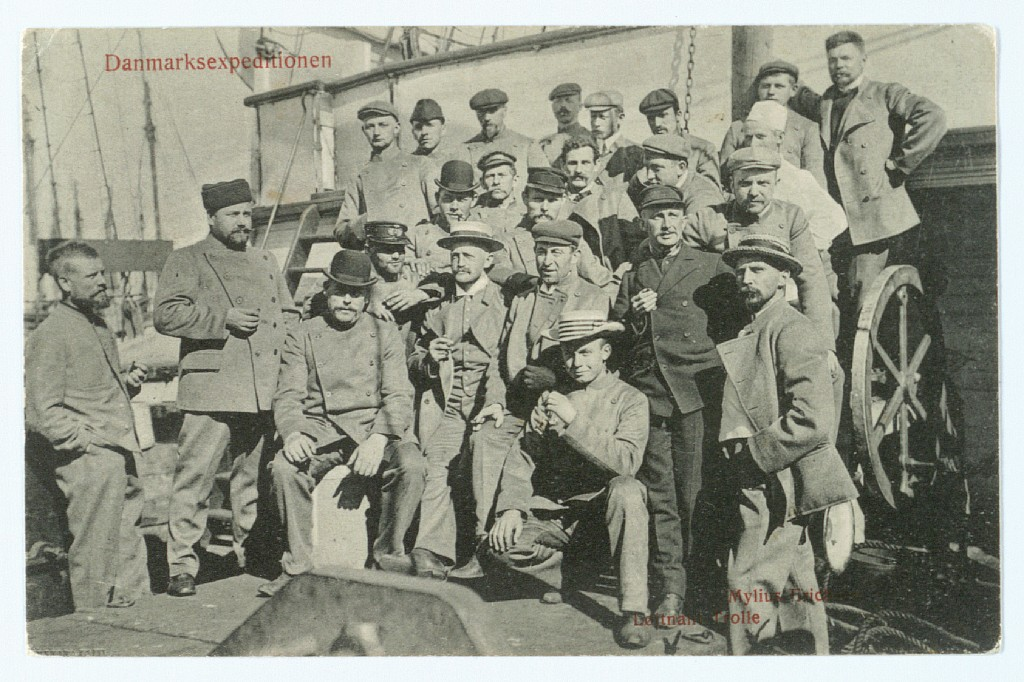
Expedition members on the deck of the ship

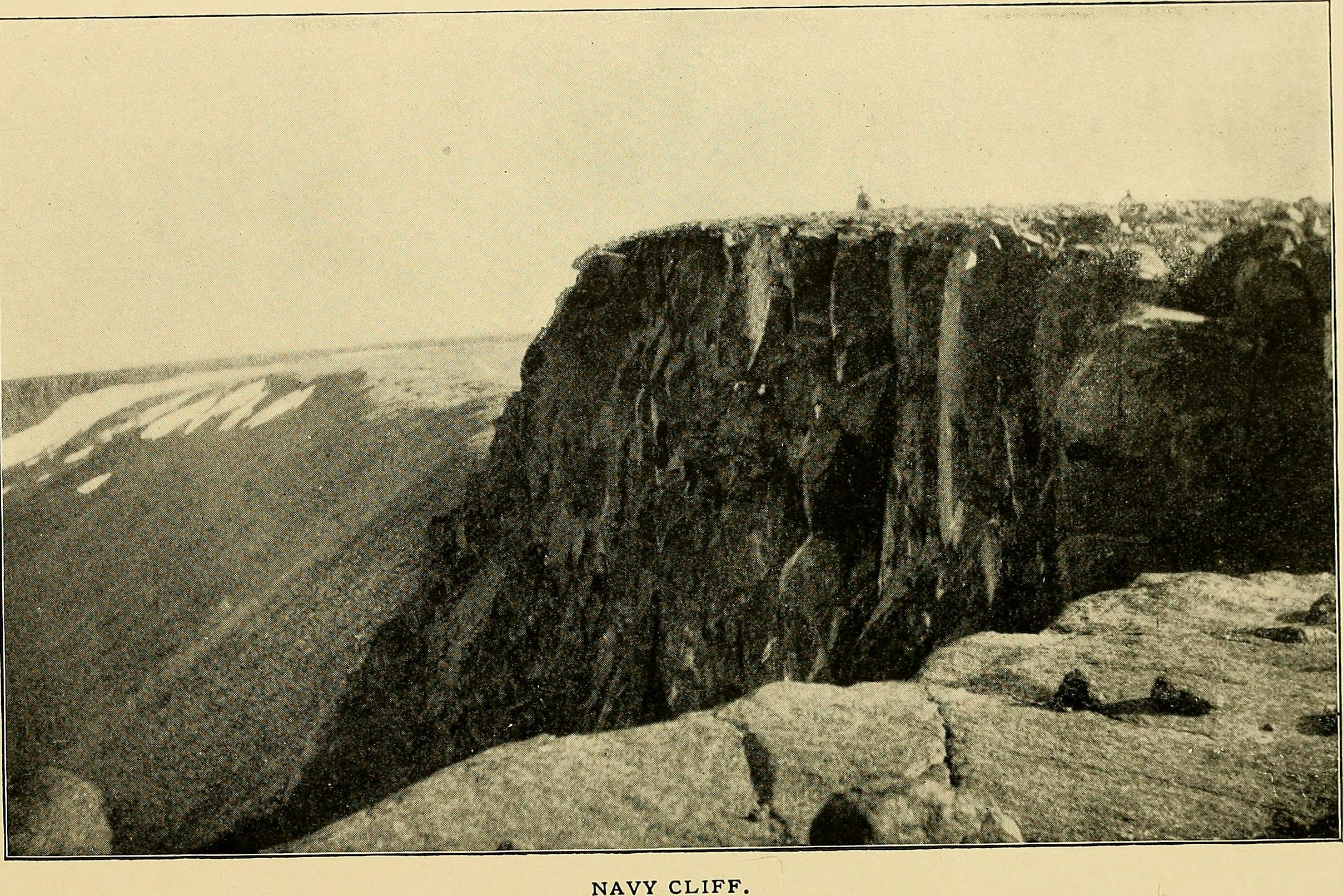
Navy Cliff, the easternmost point accurately mapped by Robert Peary in the Independence Fjord area. Features drawn by Peary east of it were mere guesswork that fatally misled the main exploration team led by Mylius-Erichsen.

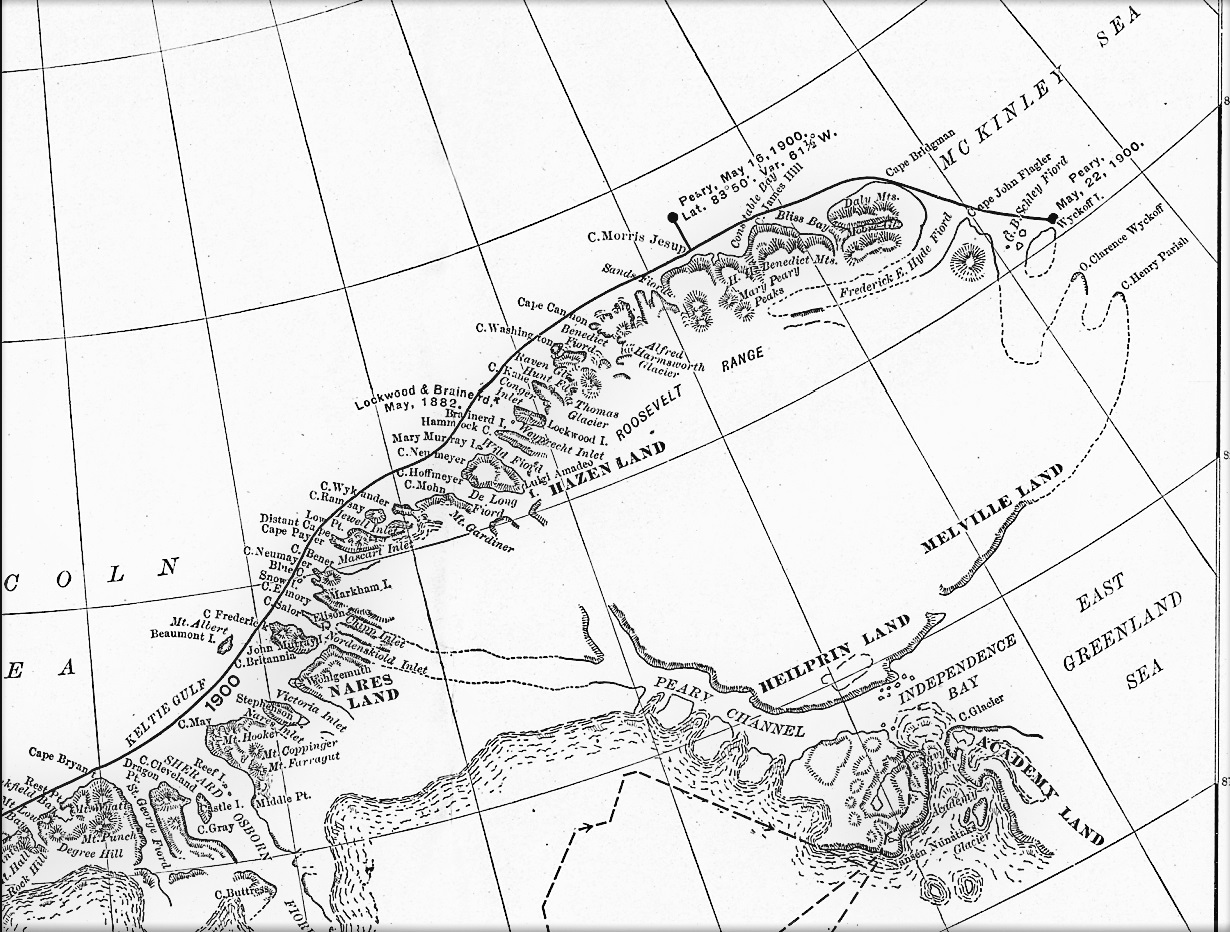
Robert Peary's 1903 Northern Greenland map section showing the (non-existent) Peary Channel and the geographical features he named in the area.

=== Arrival and preparation ===
The expedition travelled to Greenland aboard the Danmark, reaching a sheltered place in southern Germania Land in August 1906 and establishing its main base there, Danmarkshavn, which was named after the ship.

The captain of the ship was Lieutenant Alf Trolle of the Danish Navy and the doctor Johannes Lindhard. Expedition members included a very large staff of mostly Danish scientists, as well as West Greenlanders who came aboard in Iceland and the Faeroe Islands along with a hundred sled dogs. Among the scientists was German meteorologist Alfred Wegener. Georg Carl Amdrup was in charge of writing the official history of the expedition.

In the autumn of 1906, northbound sled journeys began in order to lay depots along the route of the long northern explorations in the spring of the following year.

=== The main exploration teams ===
Finally, ten sleds led by Mylius-Erichsen left Danmarkshavn at the end of March 1907, heading north on the coastal ice. Along Jokel Bay, where the Greenland ice sheet comes down to the sea, buckling and cracking the ice near the shore, travelling was difficult and sleds broke and had to be continually repaired. The harsh ice conditions continued along Hovgaard Island further north.

At Mallemuk Mountain in SE Holm Land the coastal ice of the Dijmphna Sound gave way to a polynya and, as the sleds tried to find a way around the open water, the first supporting party returned to Danmarkshavn.

The eight dog sleds continued northwards and found remains of ancient Inuit dwellings at Eskimonaesset, in the northeastern end of Holm Land. A few days later, off Amdrup Land, a second support section of two dog sleds returned south and split. As they travelled back to Danmarkshavn, one of the dog sleds — led by Gustav Thostrup and Alfred Wegener — mapped the shoreline, while the other one — led by Henning Bistrup and Carl Johan Ring — mapped the numerous offshore islands.

As the six northbound dog sleds sped along the eastern coast of the Crown Prince Christian Land peninsula, Mylius-Erichsen was feeling uneasy because the shore was leading them further to the northeast, which was not what he had expected. The distance to their goal was increasing, while time and provisions were running out. Finally, at the end of April, they rounded the northeastern end of Greenland, an inconspicuous point where the ice slope of the Flade Isblink met the frozen sea, and began traveling northwestwards, in the direction they had hoped for.

Shortly thereafter, they split into two teams of three dog sleds each; Ludvig Mylius-Erichsen, Niels Peter Høeg Hagen and Jørgen Brønlund, went westward hugging the coast, in the direction that they deemed would lead them to Gletscher Cape and Navy Cliff — at the head of Independence Fjord. Meanwhile, the other team — with Johan Peter Koch, Aage Bertelsen and Tobias Gabrielsen — sped northwestwards across the sea ice towards Cape Bridgman in order to map the uncharted coast sections of eastern Peary Land.

=== End of the chief team ===
Mylius-Erichsen entered the unknown Danmark Fjord without having doubts about where it was heading. The team travelled southwestwards until the head of the fjord and, becoming aware that it was a dead end, they backtracked to the northeast. By the end of May Mylius-Erichsen's team was back again at the mouth of the fjord. As they met Koch's team at Cape Rigsdagen, already on their way back from Cape Bridgman, Mylius-Erichsen realized that they had wasted precious time and provisions by entering the long unexplored fjord.

Koch and Mylius-Erichsen considered the situation. It was getting late in the season and it would be dangerous to get stuck in the inhospitable area during the summer without adequate equipment and supplies. Melting ice would make travel back to Danmarkshavn impossible. Initially, Mylius-Erichsen agreed to go back with Koch to the ship, but then he took the fateful decision to head west, leaving on 28 May.

Thus Koch departed without suspecting that he would never see the leader of the expedition again — he and his team arrived at the ship almost one month later. Mylius-Erichsen travelled west following the southern side of Independence Fjord and reached Academy Glacier at the head of Independence Fjord on 1 June, discovering that the Peary Channel did not exist.

On the way back, the team explored Brønlund Fjord and Hagen Fjord. Sudden mild weather then impeded their progress, and when they reached the western side of Danmark Fjord on 12 June, they found their way across the ice blocked by open water. They had relied on hunting for their sustenance in order to supplement their fast-dwindling provisions, but hunting was poor. The stony ground had worn their footwear and Brønlund summed up their desperate situation: "No food, no foot gear, and several hundred miles to the ship. Our prospects are very bad indeed."

It is known that when the weather became colder the three men took the same route along the coast of the farthest northeast point of Greenland where depots had been laid. By then they had only four dogs and a sled. They reached the cliffs of Mallemuk Mountain but found open water that made it impossible for them to travel straight southwards, so the exhausted men had to travel inland on 19 October 1907, the day the sun disappeared below the horizon. Walking on the ice in the darkness Høeg Hagen was the first to die of exhaustion in the Nioghalvfjerd Fjord area, followed shortly thereafter by Mylius-Erichsen.

Jørgen Brønlund reached Lambert Land in the moonlight and his body was found there by Koch in mid-March 1908. Brønlund had his diary and Hagen's cartographic sketches. He was buried at Kap Bergendahl in southeast Lambert Land, the spot where he was found, which is today known as Brønlund's Grave (Danish: Brønlunds Grav). Brønlund was only some 140 miles as the crow flies from Germania land. The expedition had covered 350 miles of the 500 that they needed to cover from Navy Cliff to Germania Land.

=== Aftermath and legacy ===
When the death of expedition leader Mylius-Erichsen was confirmed, Captain Alf Trolle took formal command of the venture. Although the original plan to move the ship to Kaiser Franz Joseph Fjord in the second year was called off, Trolle carried on with the objectives of the expedition in the area during the remaining time.

An exploration team was sent in April 1908 to Ardencaple Fjord, where the inner reaches had not yet been explored because previous expeditions could not go beyond its mouth on account of deep snow.

A second weather station was established at Mørkefjord, west of Danmarkshavn, in order to compare meteorological observations. Also, the islands, the glaciers, and the coastline of Dove Bay were explored, as well as mountains and lakes in Germania Land.

Although no living Inuit were found, the expedition discovered abundant evidence of their former habitations, such as tent rings, winter dwellings, meat caches, and tools, all along the coast up to Danmark Fjord in the far north.

The Danmark left Greenland on 21 July, arriving in Copenhagen one month later. Since the unfortunate circumstances of Mylius-Erichsen's death cast a pall over the whole expedition, its results didn't receive the attention they deserved. Even so, over 51 reports were published by its members, including those by numerous scientists. A number of them continued to work in the same field, returning to Greenland in the decades that followed, such as Peter Freuchen in the Thule Expeditions, as well as J.P. Koch, who led the 1912–13 Danish Expedition to Queen Louise Land with A. Wegener. In 1929 Wegener would return to Greenland for the German Greenland Expedition. The Danske Islands were given their name by John Haller during the 1956–1958 Expedition to East Greenland led by Lauge Koch, in order to pay due homage to the authoritative work of the 1906–08 Denmark expedition.

== Literature ==
- G. Amdrup: Report on the Danmark Expedition to the North-East Coast of Greenland 1906–1908. In: Meddelelser om Grønland 41, 1913, pp. 1–270
- Spencer Apollonio, Lands That Hold One Spellbound: A Story of East Greenland, 2008

== See also ==
- Cartographic expeditions to Greenland
- Denmark Expedition Memorial
