= Danske Islands =

Islands in Greenland

Danske Øer
- Location within Greenland

Geography
- Location: Greenland Sea
- Coordinates: 78.15859°N 19.2669°W
- Major islands: 19

Administration
- Greenland
- Zone: Northeast Greenland National Park

Demographics
- Population: 0

Danske Islands, Danish: Danske Øer; meaning 'Danish Islands', is an island group of the Greenland Sea, NE Greenland. The islands are uninhabited. Administratively they belong to the Northeast Greenland National Park.

== Name conflict ==
This island group was named by John Haller during the 1956–1958 Expedition to East Greenland led by Lauge Koch, to pay tribute to the work of the 1906–08 Denmark expedition.

Previously the Duke of Orléans in 1905 had given the name "Îles Françaises" to an island group further north, approximating to the position of the present Franske Islands. A few years later the 1906–08 Denmark expedition had transferred the name "Franske Islands" to that position, corresponding to the northernmost islands the Duke of Orléans Arctic Expedition could have seen.

A number of maps, such as the World Aeronautical Charts of 1952, among others, retain the outdated names for this island group located further south —"Franske Islands" or Îles Françaises.

== Geography ==
The Danske Islands lie off the southern part of Jokel Bay, northwest of Île-de-France. The Franske Islands lie to the north, and Gamma Island to the southwest.

Storøen is one of the largest islands of the group. Rabbit Ears Island is a well-known island because of its shape.

Map of Northeastern Greenland.

== See also ==
- List of islands of Greenland
- Eclogite
