= Petroleum exploration in the Arctic =

Industry in the Arctic

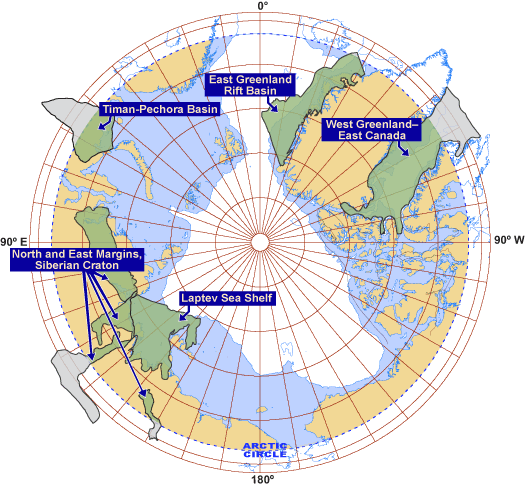
Location of Arctic Basins assessed by the USGS.

Exploration for petroleum in the Arctic is expensive and challenging both technically and logistically. In the offshore, sea ice can be a major factor. There have been many discoveries of oil and gas in the several Arctic basins that have seen extensive exploration over past decades but distance from existing infrastructure has often deterred development. Development and production operations in the Arctic offshore as a result of exploration have been limited, with the exception of the Barents and Norwegian seas. In Alaska, exploration subsequent to the discovery of the Prudhoe Bay oilfield has focussed on the onshore and shallow coastal waters.

Technological developments such as Arctic class tankers for Liquefied Natural Gas, and climatic changes leading to reduced sea ice, may see a resurgence of interest in the offshore Arctic should high oil and gas prices be sustained and environmental concerns mitigated.

Since the onset of the 2010s oil glut in 2014, and, in North America particularly, the widespread development of shale gas and oil depressed prices. Consequently commercial interest in exploring many parts of the Arctic has declined.

== Overview ==
There are 19 geological basins making up the Arctic region. Some of these basins have experienced oil and gas exploration, most notably the Alaska North Slope where oil was first produced in 1968 from Prudhoe Bay. However, only half the basins – such as the Beaufort Sea and the West Barents Sea – have been explored.

A 2008 United States Geological Survey estimates that areas north of the Arctic Circle have 90 billion barrels of undiscovered, technically recoverable oil (and 44 billion barrels of natural gas liquids ) in 25 geologically defined areas thought to have potential for petroleum. This represents 13% of the undiscovered oil in the world. Of the estimated totals, more than half of the undiscovered oil resources are estimated to occur in just three geologic provinces – Arctic Alaska, the Amerasian Basin, and the East Greenland Rift Basins.

More than 70% of the mean undiscovered oil resources is estimated to occur in five provinces: Arctic Alaska, Amerasian Basin, East Greenland Rift Basins, East Barents Basins, and West Greenland–East Canada. It is further estimated that approximately 84% of the undiscovered oil and gas occurs offshore. The USGS did not consider economic factors such as the effects of permanent sea ice or oceanic water depth in its assessment of undiscovered oil and gas resources. This assessment is lower than a 2000 survey, which had included lands south of the arctic circle.

A recent study carried out by Wood Mackenzie on the Arctic potential comments that the likely remaining reserves will be 75% natural gas and 25% oil. It highlights four basins that are likely to be the focus of the petroleum industry in the upcoming years: the Kronprins Christian Basin, which is likely to have large reserves, the southwest Greenland basin, due to its proximity to markets, and the more oil-prone basins of Laptev and Baffin Bay.

Timeline
Year	Region	Milestone
1964	Cook Inlet	shallow water steel platform in moving ice
1969	North West Passage	first commercial ship (SS Manhattan) to transit NW passage
1971	Canadian Beaufort	shallow water sand island exploration
1974	Arctic Islands	shallow and deep water ice islands exploration
1976	Canadian Beaufort	20–70 m water depth ice-strengthened drillship exploration (Canmar drillship)
1981	Canadian Beaufort	shallow water caisson exploration (Tarsiut caissons)
1983	Canadian Beaufort	20–70 m ice-resistant floating exploration drilling
1984	US & Canadian Beaufort	shallow water caisson & gravity based structure exploration (SDC drilling)
1987	US & Canadian Beaufort	spray ice islands used to reduce cost
2007	Barents Sea	subsea to shore LNG (Snøhvit field)
2008	Varandey	1st arctic offshore tanker loading terminal
2012	West Greenland	deepwater floating exploration drilling in ice
2014	Pechora Sea	1st shallow water year-round manned GBS production in the Arctic (Prirazlomnaya platform)

== Canada ==
Drilling in the Canadian Arctic peaked during the 1970s and 1980s, led by such companies as Panarctic Oils Ltd. in the Sverdrup Basin of the Arctic Islands, and by Imperial Oil and Dome Petroleum in the Beaufort Sea-Mackenzie Delta Basin. Drilling continued at declining rates until the early 2000s. In all, some 300,000 km of seismic and 1500 wells were drilled across this vast area. Approximately 1.9 billion barrels (300×10^{6} m^{3}) of oil and 32.4 trillion cubic feet (9.2×10^{11} m^{3}) of natural gas were found in 73 discoveries, mostly in the two basins mentioned above, as well as further south in the Mackenzie Valley. Although certain discoveries proved large, the discovered resources were insufficient to justify development at the time. All the wells which were drilled were plugged and abandoned.

Drilling in the Canadian Arctic turned out to be challenging and expensive, particularly in the offshore where drilling required innovative technology. Short operating seasons complicated logistics for companies who had to contend with the additional risk of variable ice conditions.

Exploration has demonstrated that several sedimentary basins in the Canadian Arctic are rich in oil and gas. In particular, the Beaufort Sea-Mackenzie Delta Basin has a discovery record for both gas (onshore) and oil and gas (offshore) although the potential beneath the deeper waters of the Beaufort Sea remains unconfirmed by drilling. Discoveries in the Sverdrup Basin made between 1969 and 1971 are principally of gas. The several basins in the eastern Arctic offshore have seen little exploration activity.

== Russia ==
In June 2007, a group of Russian geologists returned from a six-week voyage on a nuclear icebreaker 50 Let Pobedy, the expedition called Arktika 2007. They had travelled to the Lomonosov ridge, an underwater shelf going between Russia's remote, inhospitable eastern Arctic Ocean, and Ellesmere Island in Canada where the ridge lies 400m under the ocean surface.

According to Russia's media, the geologists returned with the "sensational news" that the Lomonosov ridge was linked to Russian Federation territory, boosting Russia's claim over the oil-and-gas rich triangle. The territory contained 10bn tonnes of gas and oil deposits, the scientists said.

== Greenland ==
In the years post 2000, sedimentary basins offshore Greenland were believed by some geologists to have high potential for large oil discoveries. In a comprehensive study of the potential of Arctic basins published in 2008, the U.S. Geological Survey estimated that the waters off north-eastern Greenland, in the Greenland Sea north and south of the Arctic Circle, could potentially contain 50 billion barrels of oil equivalent (7.9 x 10^9 m^3) (an estimate including both oil and gas). None of this potential has been realized.

Prospecting took place under the auspices of NUNAOIL, a partnership between the Greenland Home Rule Government and the Danish state. Various oil companies secured licences and conducted exploration over the period 2002 to 2020. Much seismic exploration and several wells were drilled offshore western Greenland, but no discoveries were announced. Drilling proved expensive and the geology more complex than expected, discouraging further investment.

Greenland has offered 8 license blocks for tender along its west coast by Baffin Bay. Seven of those blocks were bid for by a combination of multinational oil companies and the National Oil Company NUNAOIL. Companies that have participated successfully in the previous license rounds and have formed a partnership for the licenses with NUNAOIL are, DONG Energy, Chevron, ExxonMobil, Husky Energy, Cairn Energy. The area available, known as the West Disko licensing round, is of interest because of its relative accessibility compared to other Arctic basins as the area remains largely free of ice. Also, it has a number of promising geological leads and prospects from the Paleocene era.

In 2021, following the election of a new executive, the Greenland government announced it would cease petroleum licensing and disband the state oil company Nunaoil. This political development, combined with the high costs of drilling exploratory wells and discouraging exploration results to date, it is unlikely that the Greenland offshore will see further exploration for the foreseeable future.

== United States ==
Prudhoe Bay Oil Field on Alaska's North Slope is the largest oil field in North America, The field was discovered on March 12, 1968, by Atlantic Richfield Company (ARCO) and is operated by Hilcorp; partners are ExxonMobil and ConocoPhillips.

In September 2012 Shell delayed actual oil drilling in the Chukchi until the following summer due to heavier-than-normal ice and the Arctic Challenger, an oil-spill response vessel, not being ready on time. However, on September 23, Shell began drilling a "top-hole" over its Burger prospect in the Chukchi. And on October 3, Shell began drilling a top-hole over its Sivulliq prospect in the Beaufort Sea, after being notified by the Alaska Eskimo Whaling Commission that drilling could begin.

In September, 2012, Statoil, now Equinor, chose to delay its oil exploration plans at its Amundsen prospect in the Chukchi Sea, about 100 miles northwest of Wainwright, Alaska, by at least one year, to 2015 at the earliest.

In 2012 Conoco planned to drill at its Devil's Paw prospect (part of a 2008 lease buy in the Chukchi Sea 120 miles west of Wainwright) in summer of 2013. This project was later shelved in 2013 after concerns over rig type and federal regulations related to runaway well containment.

October 11, 2012, Dep. Secretary of the Department of the Interior David Hayes stated that support for the permitting process for Arctic offshore petroleum drilling will continue if President Obama stays in office.

Shell, however, announced in September 2015 that it was abandoning exploration "for the foreseeable future" in Alaska, after tests showed disappointing quantities of oil and gas in the area.

On October 4, 2016 Caelus Energy Alaska announced its discovery at Smith Bay could "provide 200,000 barrels per day of light, highly mobile oil".

== Norway ==
Rosneft and Equinor (then Statoil) made the Arctic exploration deal in May 2012. It is the third deal Rosneft has signed in the past month, after Arctic exploration agreements with Italy's Eni and US giant ExxonMobil. Compared to other Arctic oil states, Norway is probably best equipped for oil spill preparedness in the Arctic.

== Environmental concerns ==
Petroleum exploration and production operations in the Arctic have faced concerns from organizations and governments about the potential for detrimental environmental consequences. Firstly, in the event of a large oil spill, the effects on Arctic marine life (such as Polar Bears, Walruses and seals) could be calamitous. Secondly, pollution from ships and noise pollution from seismic exploration and drilling, could negatively affect fragile Arctic ecosystems and may lead to declining populations. Such issues concern Indigenous populations who live in the Arctic and rely on such animals as food sources.

In response to these concerns, the Arctic Council working group on Arctic Monitoring and Assessment Programme (AMAP) undertook a comprehensive review of Oil and Gas Activities in the Arctic - Effects and Potential Effects. In another initiative, Greenpeace, an independent global campaigning network, have launched the Save the Arctic Project since the melting Arctic is under threat from oil drilling, industrial fishing and conflict.

Response of governments to mounting concerns about the risk of petroleum operations in the Arctic offshore include regulatory changes and the moratorium on offshore leasing issued in 2016 for the Arctic marine waters of both the United States and Canada (and subsequently in Canada a prohibition of oil and gas operations). Consequently, no leasing or operations have been approved for the Canadian Arctic offshore since that year.

In 2021, the Greenland government ended plans for future licensing for offshore exploration citing high costs and climate change impacts.

A summary of the status of offshore oil and gas activities and regulatory frameworks in the Arctic was published by PAME in 2021. (Program for the Protection of the Arctic Marine Environment.). The Deepwater Horizon disaster in the Gulf of Mexico stimulated much concern about the consequences of a similar event in Arctic waters and has resulted in many developments in regulation of operations and management of oil and gas leasing by countries active in Arctic exploration.

In 2021, the Arctic Environmental Responsibility Index (AERI) was published that ranks 120 oil, gas, and mining companies involved in resource extraction north of the Arctic Circle in Alaska, Canada, Greenland, Finland, Norway, Russia, and Sweden. The Index measures companies' environmental activities and demonstrates that oil and gas companies are generally ranked higher than mining companies operating in the Arctic.

== Geological basins in the Arctic ==
- Alaska North Slope
- Baffin Bay
- Barents Sea West Barents Sea and East Barents Sea
- Beaufort Sea (Mackenzie Delta-Beaufort Sea Basin)
- Sverdrup Basin (Canadian Arctic Islands)
- East Siberian Sea
- Greenland (North Greenland)
- Hope Basin
- Kronprins Christian Basin
- Laptev Sea
- North Chukchi Sea
- North Kara Sea
- Pechora Sea
- South Kara Sea

== See also ==
- Arctic cooperation and politics
- Arctic Refuge drilling controversy
- Natural resources of the Arctic
- Pollution in the Arctic Ocean
- Territorial claims in the Arctic
