= Norske Islands =

Islands in Greenland

Norske Øer
- Location within Greenland

Geography
- Location: Greenland Sea
- Coordinates: 79.09°N 17.80°W
- Total islands: 2
- Area: 200 km^{2} (77 sq mi)
- Highest elevation: 499.8 m (1639.8 ft)

Administration
- Greenland
- Zone: Northeast Greenland National Park

Demographics
- Population: 0

Norske Islands, Danish: Norske Øer; meaning 'Norse Islands', is a group of two uninhabited islands of the Greenland Sea, Greenland.

They were named by the Denmark expedition in honor of the two Norwegian expedition members.

== Geography ==
The Norske Islands lie near Cape Drygalsky off the coast of Lambert Land and northeast of Jokel Bay, northeastern Greenland, to the southeast of the entrance to the Nioghalvfjerd Fjord of the Nioghalvfjerdsbrae glacier. The Franske Islands lie to the south, and the Achton Friis and Schnauder Islands to the southwest. Tobias Island lies far to the northeast.

There are two main islands in the group, Store Norske, with Cape Nansen as its northernmost landhead, and a much smaller island (Lille Norske) to the south, separated from Store Norske by a narrow sound. There are also a few small islets. The group's southernmost landhead, Cape Amundsen, is located at the southern end of the smaller island.

Store Norske, the largest island has a total area of 186.4 km^{2} (72.0 sq mi) and a shoreline of 68.9 km (42.8 mi).

Map of Northeastern Greenland.

== See also ==
- List of islands of Greenland
