= Tobias Island =

Island in Greenland

Greenlandic: Tuppiap Qeqertaa Danish: Tobias Ø
- Location within Greenland

Geography
- Location: Greenland Sea
- Coordinates: 79°20′N 15°48′W
- Length: 2 km (1.2 mi)
- Width: 1.5 km (0.93 mi)

Administration
- Greenland (Denmark)
- Northeast Greenland National Park

Demographics
- Population: 0 (2013)

Tobias Island (Greenlandic: Tuppiap Qeqertaa, Danish: Tobias Ø) is a small island off the northeastern coast of Greenland.

The island was named in honour of Greenlandic dogsled expert Tobias Gabrielsen who went with Johan Peter Koch and Aage Bertelsen to map the unknown eastern coast of Peary Land to the southeast of Cape Bridgman during the Denmark expedition 1906–1908, while Ludvig Mylius-Erichsen's ill-fated team went west to map the Independence Fjord.

== Geography ==
Located roughly 70 km from the mouth of the Nioghalvfjerd Fjord, to the ENE of the Norske Islands, the position of Tobias Island was determined with accuracy only in 1993. It is an uninhabited barren knoll measuring 3.0 km^{2} (1.2 sq mi), 2,000 metres (1.2 mi) long and 1,500 metres (0.93 mi) wide, located in the Greenland Sea. It has been claimed by Greenland (Denmark) since 25 April 2001.

Reported Fata Morgana Land, a phantom island, sightings since 1907 were deemed to be of Tobias Island, although it is located somewhat further south.

== See also ==
- Fata Morgana Land
- List of islands of Greenland
- List of features in Greenland named after Greenlandic Inuit
