= Achton =

Achton is a Danish given name.

People with this name include:

- Achton Mikkelsen (born 1932), Danish boxer
- Achton Friis (1871–1939), Danish illustrator, painter and writer, who participated in the Denmark expedition to Northeast Greenland in 1906–1908

== See also ==
- Achton Friis Islands (Danish: Achton Friis Øer), a group of uninhabited islands in the Greenland Sea, Greenland, named in honour of Achton Friis
