= Fata Morgana Land =

Phantom island in the Arctic Ocean

- Reported location of Fata Morgana Land
- Created by: First reported by J.P. Koch and Aage Bertelsen

In-universe information
- Type: Phantom island
- Locations: Greenland Sea

Fata Morgana Land (Danish: Fata Morgana Landet) is a phantom island first sighted in the Arctic, off the north-eastern coast of Greenland in 1907 by J.P. Koch and Aage Bertelsen. It has been reported between Greenland and Svalbard, at the northern end of the Greenland Sea. It is a reflection of the nearby Tobias Island and does not actually exist. Its status as a mirage or phantom island was confirmed in 1993.

== History ==
J.P. Koch and Aage Bertelsen were the first to report sighting land at approximately 80°00′N 10°00′W. This sighting occurred in 1907, during the 1906–08 Denmark Expedition led by Ludvig Mylius-Erichsen. Fata Morgana Land was also allegedly sighted near this location by Lauge Koch in 1933, from the air, as well as by Peter Freuchen in 1935 and by Ivan Papanin in 1937. Following Papanin's sighting, Koch undertook a seaplane expedition from Svalbard in 1938 to search for the supposed island. He used a Dornier Wal, 297 'Samum', purchased by the Danish government from Germany. With Flight Captain Rudolf Mayer and wireless operator Franz Preuschoff (lent from Deutsche Luft Hansa) and a Danish naval officer, Koch flew from Copenhagen to Kings Bay in Spitsbergen. They approached Greenland from different directions but were unable to find any trace of land.

The non-existent island was named Fata Morgana Land after the Fata Morgana, a type of mirage common in polar regions. The assumption is, the mirage sighted at its location was actually Fata Morganas of Tobias Island (Greenlandic: Tuppiap Qeqertaa). The position of Tobias Island, roughly 70 kilometres (43 mi) from the north-eastern coast of Greenland, was determined with accuracy only in 1993.

== Mirages ==
In the 1820s and 30s in Great Britain, mirages were a widely studied phenomenon. Scientists theorized about the causes and conditions for mirages as well as their symbolic meaning and religious role. This investigation was tied into scientific curiosities about the human eye and the natural world.

Fata Morganas are a type of mirage called a superior mirage. A superior mirage is created by a downward refraction of light as it passes through a temperature gradient, warm to cold. This type of mirage is most common in polar regions where the temperature change is vast enough to create a large refraction. The downward curvature of the refracted light must be equal to or greater than the curvature of the Earth. Fata Morganas are a distinct type of superior mirage because they are complex and clear images that appear in sets of three or more. They are not always linked to real objects on the horizon.

== Tuppiap Qeqertaa (Tobias Island) ==
Tuppiap Qeqertaa (Tobias island) is located 70 km off the coast of Greenland and is 2 km long and 35 m tall. The small island is covered in ice, this caused its true size to remain hidden until satellite interferometry and airborne laser scanning was used to map the area. This area was particularly hard to map traditionally and prone to Fata Morganas because of the often foggy and cloudy weather and being covered in sea ice.

The confirmation that this island was a Fata Morganas, not a true island did not come until 1993, with the use of satellite mapping. This is caused by the conditions of the area, the icy rocky waters make it very hard to reach the island by ship, and the foggy and cloudy weather makes it very hard to observe from the aerial view of a sea plane.

== See also ==
- Cartographic expeditions to Greenland
- Fata Morgana (mirage)
- List of islands of Greenland
