= Franske Islands =

Islands in Greenland

Franske Øer, Iles Françaises
- Location within Greenland

Geography
- Location: Greenland Sea
- Coordinates: 78.6847°N 18.3832°W
- Total islands: 7

Administration
- Greenland
- Zone: Northeast Greenland National Park

Demographics
- Population: 0

The Franske Islands (Danish: Franske Øer; French: Iles Françaises, both meaning 'French Islands') is a group of uninhabited islands of the Greenland Sea, Greenland. Administratively, the islands belong to the Northeast Greenland National Park.

== Geography ==
Map of Northeastern Greenland

The Franske Islands lie off Jokel Bay, northeastern Greenland, just east of Schnauder Island and the Achton Friis Islands, between the Norske Islands to the north and the Danske Islands to the south.

There are seven large islands in the group, as well as numerous smaller islands and islets. The Duke of Orléans Arctic Expedition had given the name "Iles Françaises" to a group further south in 1905. A few years later the Denmark Expedition transferred the name to the northernmost islands that the French expedition could have explored and named the group south of the Pariserøerne "Danske Islands".

== See also ==
- List of islands of Greenland
