= Achton Friis Islands =

Islands in Greenland

Achton Friis Øer
- Location of the Achton Friis Islands in Greenland
- Interactive map of Achton Friis Islands

Geography
- Location: Greenland Sea
- Coordinates: 78.956°N 19.2353°W
- Area: 8.94 km^{2} (3.45 sq mi)

Administration
- Greenland
- Zone: Northeast Greenland National Park

Demographics
- Population: 0

The Achton Friis Islands (Danish: Achton Friis Øer) are a group of uninhabited islands in the Greenland Sea, Greenland.

They were named by the Denmark expedition in honour of illustrator Achton Friis, one of the expedition members.

== Geography ==
The Achton Friis Islands lie northeast of Jøkel Bay, northeastern Greenland. They are located east of the terminus of the Zachariæ Isstrøm glacier, south of Cape Drygalsky, off the southeastern coast of Lambert Land and north of Schnauder Island; to the southwest of the Norske Islands and northwest of the Franske Islands.

The main island in the group, Achton Friis Island (Danish: Achton Friis Ø) is 8.0 square kilometres (3.1 mi^{2}).

Map of Northeastern Greenland including Achton Friis Islands

== See also ==
- List of islands of Greenland
