= Duke of Orléans Land =

Land area in Greenland

Hertugen af Orléans Land
- Location within Greenland

Geography
- Location: East Greenland
- Coordinates: 78°10′N 21°37′W
- Adjacent to: Zachariæ Isstrøm; Jøkel Bay; Kofoed-Hansen Glacier; Greenland Ice Sheet
- Length: 150 km (93 mi)
- Width: 50 km (31 mi)
- Highest elevation: 1,483 m (4865 ft)
- Highest point: Bildsøe Nunatak

Administration
- Greenland
- Zone: NE Greenland National Park

Demographics
- Population: Uninhabited

Duke of Orléans Land (Danish: Hertugen af Orléans Land) is a land area —possibly a peninsula— in King Frederick VIII Land, northeastern Greenland. Administratively it belongs to the NE Greenland National Park area.

== Geography ==
The Duke of Orléans Land is bounded in the north by the Zachariæ Isstrøm, beyond which rises Lambert Land, in the east by the Jøkel Bay of the Greenland Sea, in the south by the Kofoed-Hansen Glacier, beyond which rises Nordmarken. To the west rises the Greenland Ice Sheet.

The Bildsøe Nunatak rises roughly in the central area. Other important nunataks in the area are the Laub Nunataks, Gronne Nunatak, Garde Nunataks, Mokke Nunataks and Pic de Gerlache. Near the northern end flows the Gammel Hellerup Glacier into Jokel Bay and the Blæse Glacier further south. The area is largely glaciated and it includes the Sønderland, Søndre Mellemland, Mellemland and Nørreland —with the Nørre Biland and Nørre Mellemland— sections. The Alabama Nunatak rises beyond the SW end.

== History ==
Duke of Orléans Land was named in 1905 by the Prince Philippe, Duke of Orléans during his Arctic Expedition on ship Belgica, when he explored parts of the northeastern coast of Greenland. Initially the Duke named it Terre de France (French Land), but the Danish administration vetoed the name. Following consultations with Belgian explorer Adrien de Gerlache (1866–1934), the 1906–08 Danmark Expedition placed the name "Duke of Orléans Land" in the present location.

Map of Northeastern Greenland
