= Pic de Gerlache =

Mountain in Northeast Greenland National Park, Greenland

- Location within Greenland

Highest point
- Elevation: 912 m (2,992 ft)
- Coordinates: 78°36′3″N 21°27′7″W

Geography
- Location: Duke of Orléans Land, Greenland

Climbing
- First ascent: Unknown

Pic de Gerlache is a mountain in King Frederick VIII Land, NE Greenland. Administratively it is part of the Northeast Greenland National Park.

== History ==
This nunatak was named in 1905 by the Duke of Orléans during his Arctic Expedition on ship Belgica, when he explored parts of the northeastern coast of Greenland. He named it after Belgian explorer Adrien de Gerlache (1866–1934).

Although this peak was an important landmark for the first explorers of the area, the 1906–08 Danmark Expedition was unable to identify the original peak. Since the expedition members considered that the name should be preserved, it was placed on a conspicuous 912 m (2,992 ft) mountain rising on the north side of Gammel Hellerup Glacier.

A few years later, Ejnar Mikkelsen described this mountain as a pyramid during the 1909-12 Alabama Expedition:

Fifty miles or more away we can see the steep slopes of Lambert Land, while behind us the pyramid of the Pic de Gerlache and the steep peaks of the other nunataks rise sharply above the inland ice.

== Geography ==
Pic de Gerlache is located in Norre Biland, the northern section of Duke of Orléans Land. It rises from a nunatak a few kilometers inland in the central zone of Jøkel Bay. On some maps the name is misplaced westwards to a slightly higher but less prominent nunatak peak.

Map of Northeastern Greenland.

== See also ==
- List of mountains in Greenland
- List of Nunataks§Greenland

== Bibliography ==
- Greenland geology and selected mineral occurrences - GEUS
