= Sigguk Block =

Oil exploration block in Baffin Bay, Greenland

Sigguk
- Location of the Sigguk Block oil field within Greenland
- Country: Greenland
- Location: Baffin Bay
- Block: 2008/10
- Offshore/onshore: offshore
- Coordinates: 71°41′00″N 55°52′00″W
- Operator: Cairn Energy
- Partners: Cairn Energy (67.5%); Petronas (20%); NUNAOIL (12.5%)

Field history
- Discovery: 2010

Sigguk Block is an oil exploration block in Baffin Bay. It is located 175 kilometres (109 mi) west of Disko Island, Greenland. The block consists of Alpha, T4, and T8 prospects. The license to explore the block belongs to Cairn Energy's subsidiary Capricorn Greenland Exploration Limited. In October 2009 Cairn Energy sold a 20% stake of its rights to Petronas. The national oil company of Greenland NUNAOIL owns 12.5% interest. The license expired on 31 December 2017.

Exploration wells at the Alpha prospect are drilled by semi-submersible drilling rig Stena Don and at the T8 prospect by the drillship Stena Forth. Drilling commenced on 1 July 2010. On 24 August 2010, Stena Forth discovered natural gas resource when it drilled the T8-1 exploration well. However, this resource occurred to be too small for commercial production. The well was plugged and abandoned. On 21 September 2010 it was announced that oil and gas resource was discovered when drilling the Alpha-1S1 well.

Drilling at the Sigguk Block is opposed by Greenpeace. On 31 August 2010, four Greenpeace activists invaded Stena Don which was drilling on the Alpha prospect. The Government of Greenland described this action as "very serious and an illegal attack on the country's constitutional rights". This action was ended on 1 September due to bad weather. All four activist were arrested and charged with breaking and entering, as well as trespass.
