= Île-de-France (Greenland) =

Uninhabited island of the Greenland Sea, Greenland

Qeqertaq Prins Henrik
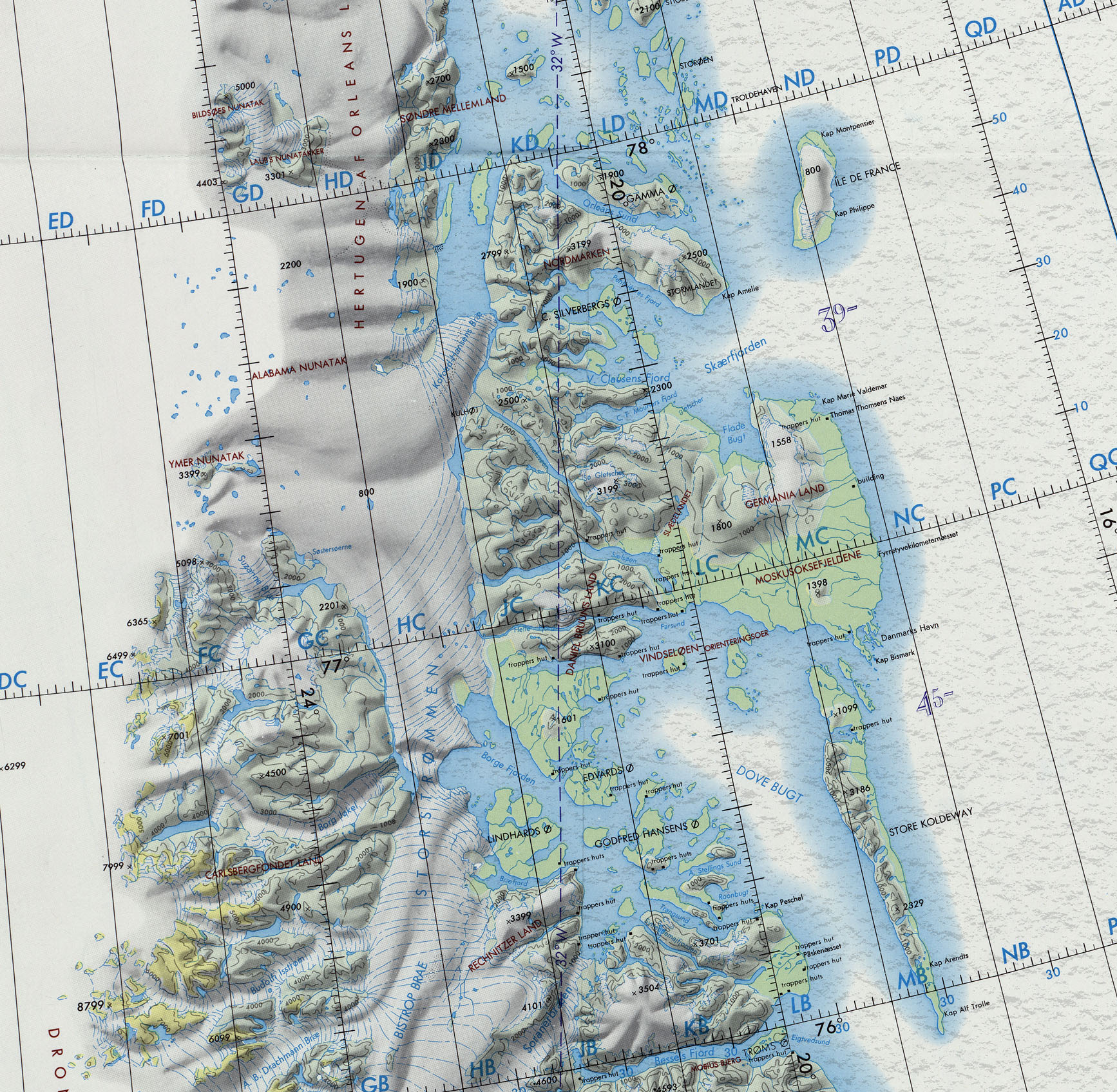

- Location within Greenland

Geography
- Location: Greenland Sea
- Coordinates: 77°43′N 17°45′W
- Area: 246.1 km^{2} (95.0 sq mi)
- Highest elevation: 196.46 m (644.55 ft)

Administration
- Greenland
- Zone: Northeast Greenland National Park

Demographics
- Population: 0

Île-de-France (also called Qeqertaq Prins Henrik or Prince Henrik's island in Greenlandic) is an uninhabited island of the Greenland Sea, Greenland.

On 11 June 2004, the Greenland Home Rule Authority (Hjemmestyret) officially changed the name of the island Île de France to Qeqertaq Prins Henrik as a present to Prince Henrik of Denmark, husband of Queen Margrethe II of Denmark, on the occasion of his 70th birthday.

The island has an area of 246.1 km² and a shoreline of 71.9 kilometres. It lies off the southern part of Jokel Bay and southeast of the Danske Islands.

Skaer Fjord is located southwest of Île-de-France's southern end. It is a broad fjord or bay with several arms extending westwards from it.

== History ==
This island was named in 1905 by the Duke of Orléans during his Duke of Orléans Arctic Expedition when he explored parts of the northeastern coast of Greenland on ship Belgica.

== See also ==
- List of islands of Greenland
