= Aage Bertelsen =

Danish painter (1873–1945)

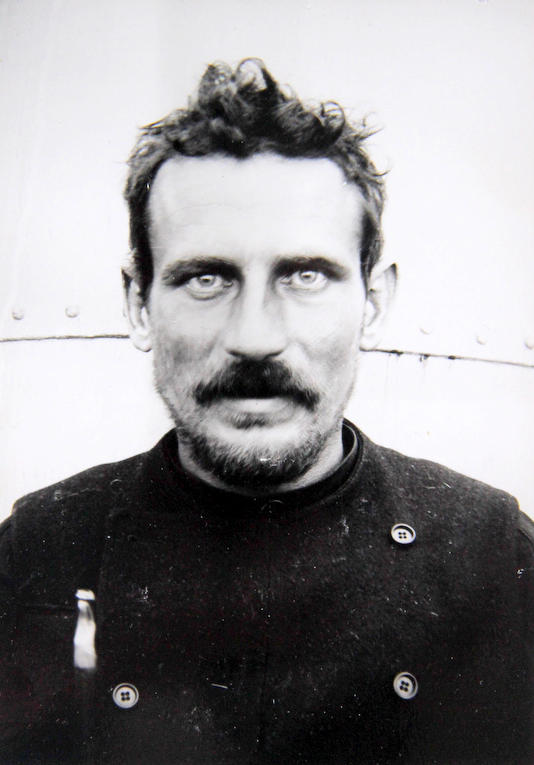
- Born: Aage Bertelsen; September 28, 1873; Næstved, Denmark
- Died: September 9, 1945 (aged 74); Copenhagen, Denmark
- Known for: Painting

Aage Bertelsen (28 September 1873 – 9 September 1945) was a Danish painter. He was a member of the Denmark Expedition to North-East Greenland. He has also worked for Kähler Keramik in Næstved.

== Biography ==
=== Early life and career ===
Aage Bertelsen was born in Næstved where his father, the painter Rudolf Bertelsen, was an art teacher at the Herlufsholm Boarding School. From an early age he was taught to draw and paint by his father as well as by the painter L.A. Ring who was a close friend of the family. He later attended Zahrtmann's art school from 1892 to 1896 while working for Landvæsenet (1894–1897). Zahrtmann accompanied him on a journey to Italy in 1897 and in 1899–1900 he visited Germany and France.

Bertelsen exhibited at Charlottenborg's Spring Exhibition from 1899 to 1903 and at Kleis' exhibition in 1901 and was a member of Den Frie Udstilling from 1904.

=== Expedition to Greenland, 1906–1908 ===
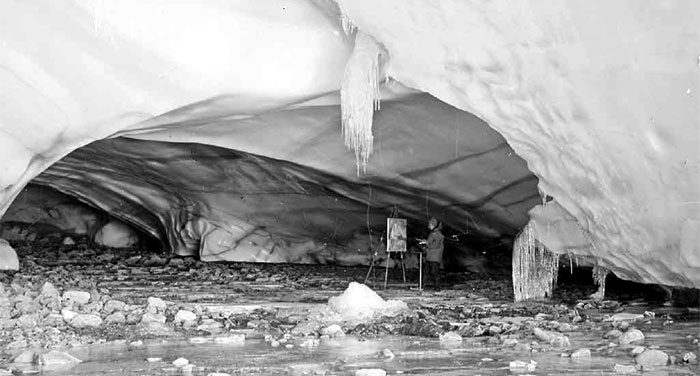
Aage Bertelsen painting the Gnipa Cave

In 1906–1908, Bertelsen participated in the Denmark Expedition to northeastern Greenland. In 1908, an exhibition with Bertelsen's and Achton Friis' works from the expedition was featured first at Den Frie Udstilling in Copenhagen and later in Aarhus and Odense. In 1909 it moved on to Berlin and other German cities and in 1910 it was exhibited by the Royal Geographical Society in London. Later exhibitions of their works from the expedition include an exhibition at the Rudolph Tegner Museum in 2011. A comprehensive extract from Friis' and Bertelsen's diaries was published in 2013.

In 1907 Bertelsen, together with J.P. Koch, was reported to have first seen Fata Morgana Land (Danish: Fata Morgana Landet), a phantom island supposedly lying between NE Greenland and Svalbard. This elusive land was allegedly seen as well by Lauge Koch from the air in 1933.

=== Later life ===
Back in Denmark, he settled in Birkerød as a landscape painter. He was a co-founder of Kunst for Varer ("Art for Goods") in 1924 and was chairman of the organization until his death in 1945. He is buried at Birkerød Cemetery.

== Honours ==
The Aage Bertelsen Glacier, as well as Cape Aage Bertelsen, a headland in Queen Louise Land, were named in his honour.
