= Alabama Nunatak =

Mountain feature in Greenland

- ONC map of NE Greenland

Highest point
- Elevation: 1,520 m (4,990 ft)
- Prominence: 615 m (2,018 ft)
- Coordinates: 78°0′N 24°0′W

Geography
- Location within Greenland
- Location: Greenland

Alabama Nunatak is a nunatak in the King Frederik VIII Land area of northeastern Greenland. Administratively it is part of the Northeast Greenland National Park zone.

== History ==
This nunatak was named by Ejnar Mikkelsen after his ship during the 1909-12 Alabama Expedition. Mikkelsen and Iver Iversen went up the Storstrommen to reach the head of the Danmark Fjord, leaving this nunatak on the left in their arduous dogsled journey over the ice.

Few details are known about the circumstances of sighting and mapping of this nunatak, because Mikkelsen's diary, which had been kept in a cache at a rocky islet in Skaer Fjord, was destroyed by a polar bear.

== Geography ==
The Alabama Nunatak is located just north of the Ymer Nunatak, the northernmost spur of the Queen Louise Land group, and south of the Bildsoe Nunatak. It rises at the southwest end of Duke of Orleans Land, west of the area where the Storstrommen begins to flow southwards.

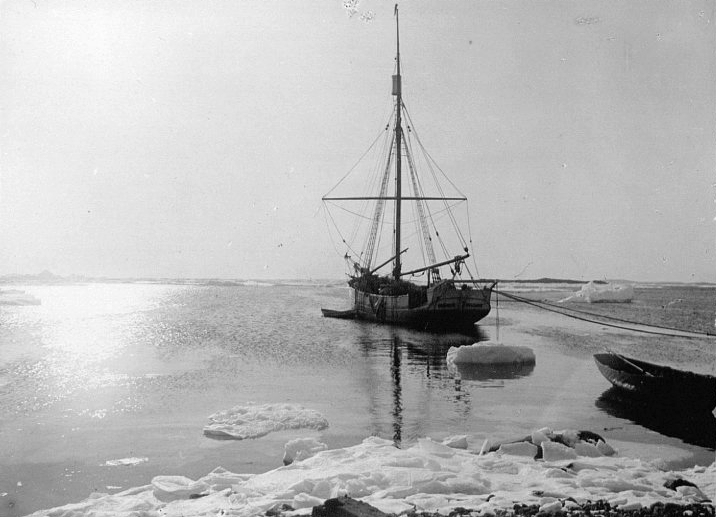
"Alabama", the ship of Mikkelsen's expedition, after which the nunatak is named.

== See also ==
- List of mountains in Greenland
- List of nunataks of Greenland
