= Kochite =

Rare silicate mineral

General
- Category: Sorosilicates; Rosenbuschite group
- Formula: (Na,Ca)_{3}Ca_{2}(Mn,Ca)ZrTi[(F,O)_{4}(Si_{2}O_{7})_{2}]
- IMA symbol: Koh
- Crystal system: Triclinic
- Crystal class: Pinacoidal (1̅) (same H-M symbol)
- Space group: P1̅
- Unit cell: a = 10.03, b = 11.33 c = 7.202 [Å]; α = 90.19° β = 100.33°, γ = 111.55°; Z = 2

Identification
- Color: Colorless to light brown
- Crystal habit: Acicular to lath-shaped prismatic crystals
- Cleavage: {100} perfect
- Fracture: Uneven
- Tenacity: Brittle
- Mohs scale hardness: 5
- Luster: Vitreous
- Streak: White
- Diaphaneity: Transparent
- Specific gravity: 3.32
- Optical properties: Biaxial (+)
- Refractive index: n_{α}=1.684, n_{β}=1.695, n_{γ}=1.718
- Birefringence: 0.0340
- Pleochroism: weak, colorless to pale brownish-yellow

Kochite is a rare silicate mineral with chemical formula of (Na,Ca)_{3}Ca_{2}(Mn,Ca)ZrTi[(F,O)_{4}(Si_{2}O_{7})_{2}] or double that. Kochite is a member of the rosenbuschite group.

== Crystallography ==
Kochite is triclinic with angles intersecting at approximately α 90.192°, β 100.192°, γ 111.551°. This mineral belongs to the space group P1̅ and is centrosymmetric, i.e. contains a center of symmetry.

It is an anisotropic mineral as the light entering the mineral is split into two rays that vibrate at 90° to each other. It is biaxial, meaning it has two optic axes (lines of symmetry). In plane polarized light, this mineral is colorless to light brown and is pleochroic. As the stage of the microscope is turned from X to Z the color changes from colorless to a pale brownish-yellow. Kochite is also a birefringent mineral, showing bright colors under crossed polarization. Its birefringence is .0340.

== Discovery and occurrence ==
Kochite is found in the alkaline igneous complex of East Greenland and is named after Danish geologist Lauge Koch (1892-1964), a geologist who overturned the previous conception of Greenland's landscapes. It is the titanium – manganese analog of rosenbuschite and occurs in nepheline syenite associated with nepheline, alkali feldspar, and låvenite in the Werner Bjerge alkaline complex along the eastern coast of Greenland.
