= Schnauder Island =

Island in Greenland

Native name: Schnauder Ø
- Location within Greenland

Geography
- Location: Jøkel Bay, Greenland Sea
- Coordinates: 78.82°N 19.46°W
- Area: 180.3 km^{2} (69.6 sq mi)

Administration
- Greenland
- Zone: Northeast Greenland National Park

Demographics
- Population: 0

Schnauder Island (Danish: Schnauder Ø) is an uninhabited island of the Greenland Sea, Greenland.

This island was named after German astronomer Max Schnauder (1860–1939) by the ill-fated Denmark Expedition.

== Geography ==
Schnauder Island lies in the northern Jøkel Bay area by the terminus of the Zachariæ Isstrøm glacier. The Achton Friis Islands lie off the northern end and the Franske Islands to the east. It has a surface of 180.3 km^{2} and a shoreline of 105 km.

Map of Northeastern Greenland.

== See also ==
- List of islands of Greenland
