= Iceland Sea =

Small body of water in the North Atlantic

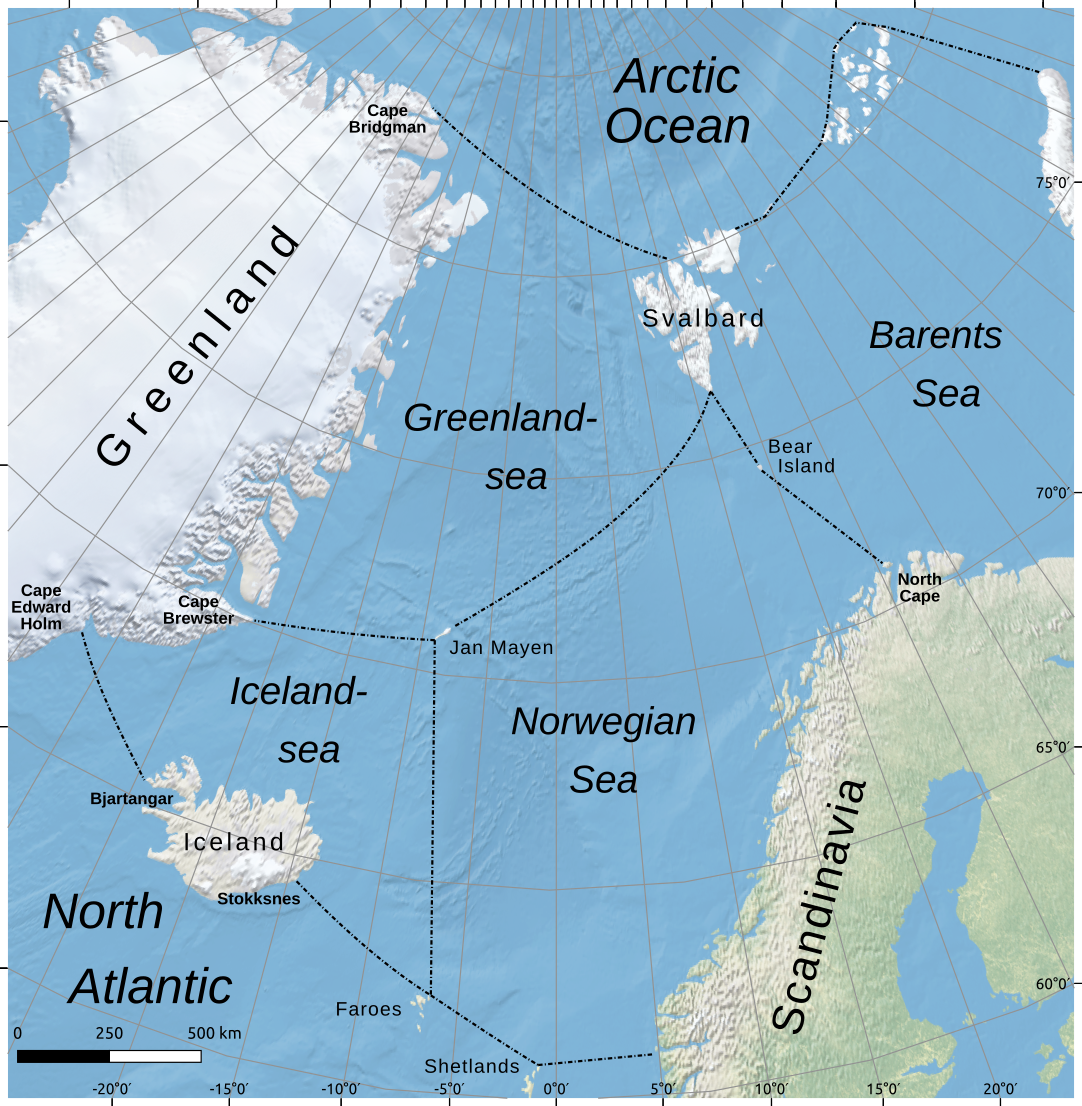
- Borders of Iceland Sea according to IHO draft standard (2002)

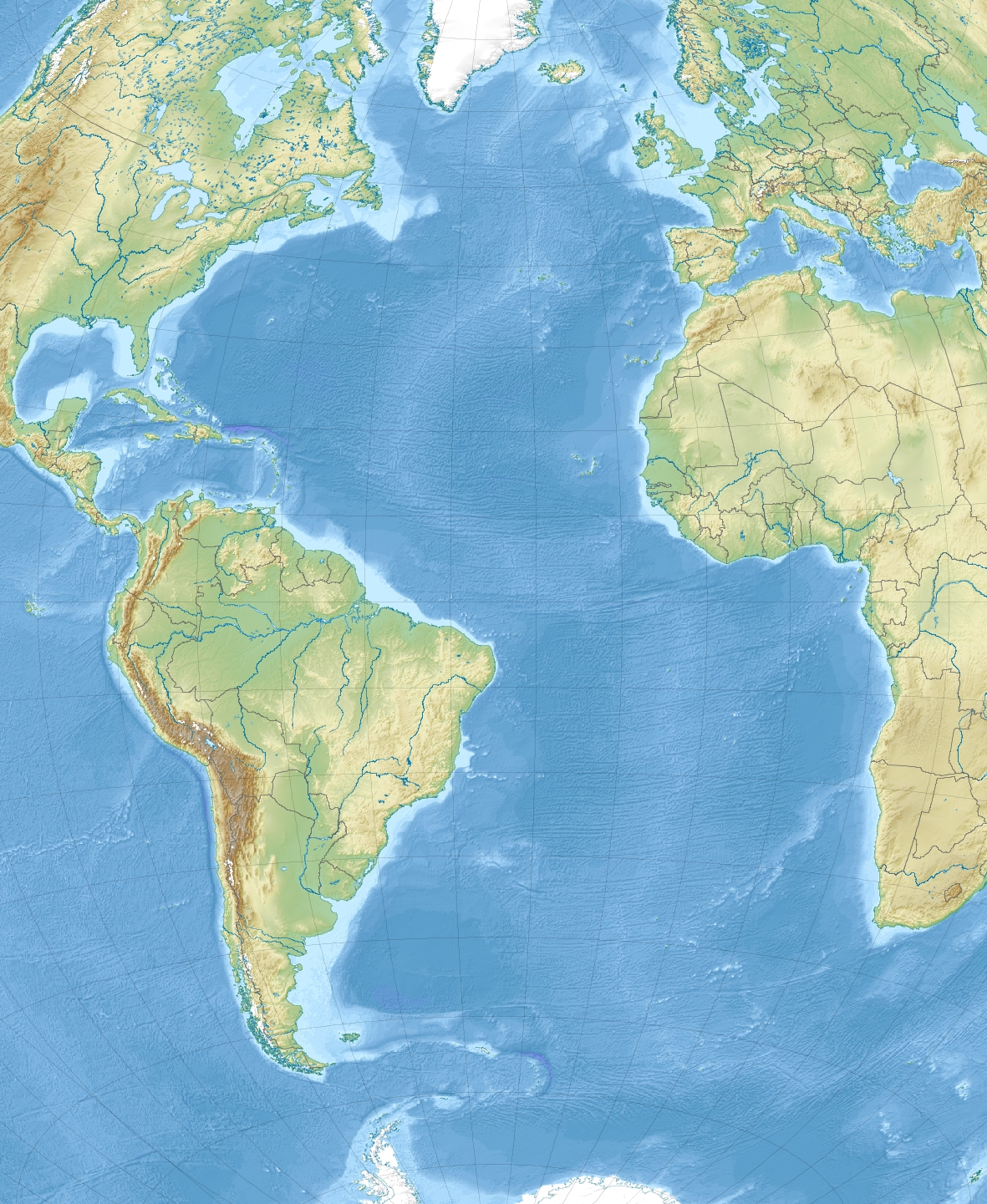
- Location within Atlantic Ocean
- Coordinates: 66.923107°N 12.628921°W
- Part of: Arctic Ocean
- Surface area: 406,000 km^{2} (157,000 sq mi)
- Average depth: 1,026 m (3,366 ft)
- Water volume: 417,000 km^{3} (100,000 cu mi)
- Islands: None

The Iceland Sea, a relatively small body of water, is bounded by Iceland. It is characterized by its proximity to the Mid-Atlantic Ridge, which transforms into the Kolbeinsey Ridge, and the Greenland-Scotland Ridge, and it lies just south of the Arctic Circle. This region is typically delineated by Greenland to the west, the Denmark Strait, and the continental shelf break south of Iceland to the south. Next in the boundary line are Jan Mayen, being a small Norwegian volcanic island, and the Jan Mayen fracture zone to the north, with the Jan Mayen Ridge to the east of the sea. This ridge serves as the northern boundary of the Iceland Sea, acting as the dividing line from the Greenland Sea. To the immediate south of Jan Mayen, the Iceland-Jan Mayen Ridge stretches towards the Iceland-Faroe Ridge, creating a boundary between the Iceland Sea and the Norwegian Sea to the east.

There were changes regarding the limits of the Iceland Sea as according to the International Hydrographic Organization, in its 1953 edition of the Limits of Oceans and Seas standard, the Greenland Sea comprises the entire area of the Iceland Sea. However, in the proposed 2002 edition, the Iceland sea is now a defined zone of its own.

== Oceanographic features ==
The depths of the Iceland Sea generally fall within the range of 500 to 2000 meters, however, are shallower on the continental shelf of East Greenland and the outer shelf north of Iceland. In contrast to the neighboring Nordic Seas, such as the Norwegian and Greenland Seas, the Iceland Sea is relatively shallow. Crossing through its central expanse in a southwest–northeast direction, the Kolbeinsey Ridge features areas within the sea that are as shallow as 500 meters, differing significantly from the surrounding waters which often exceed depths of over 1000 meters.

The Iceland Sea is surrounded by two main water masses, each originating from distinct sources and possess unique characteristics. First coming from the far south, warm saline Atlantic waters flow into the Iceland Sea from both the southwest as a branch of the Irminger Current, and from the east originating from the Norwegian Sea which then also passes through the Jan Mayen Ridge. The temperature of these Atlantic currents range from 6 to 11˚C depending on the season.

The other main water mass are Polar waters which come from the Arctic Ocean. This cold, low-salinity water flows out of the Arctic Ocean through the Greenland Sea, and into the Iceland Sea by the East Greenland Current. Within the Iceland Sea, these

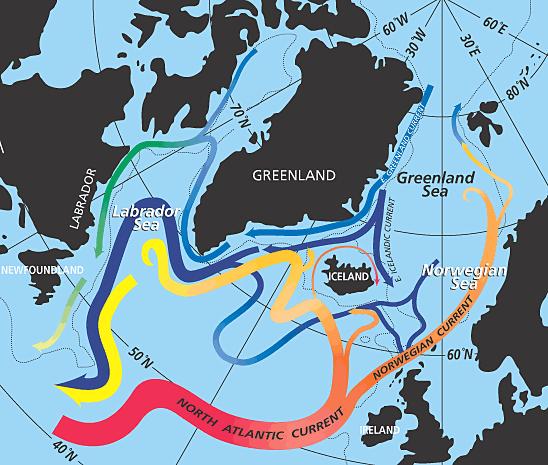
North Atlantic Water Circulation

two water masses meet, leading to varying proportions of warm and cold water. Where warm and cold-water masses converge off the northwest and the off north coasts of Iceland, a frontal area forms. Additionally, another front forms from the middle of the Denmark Strait northeastward, towards the west of Jan Mayen.

== Marine life ==
The Icelandic Sea has a diverse ecosystem with a multitude of species within. Two groups of phytoplankton inhabit these waters being diatoms and dinoflagellates. Diatoms of the genera Thalassiosira and Chaetoceros are the abundant phytoplankton and are in large quantity during the springtime. Whereas common dinoflagellates present are of the genera Ceratium and Protoperidinium that bloom after the spring, while the presence of diatoms is still high. Throughout the autumn season it is typical for a second bloom of diatoms to occur while dinoflagellates may still be abundant.

Within these waters, zooplankton, specifically copepods such as Calanus finmarchicus are present and make up anywhere between 60% and 80% of the existing zooplankton population. Other copepod species commonly found are Pseudocalanus, Acartia longiremis, and Oithona, with other species being confined to Atlantic or Polar waters.

Fish species that are found within the Icelandic Sea are cod (Gadus morhua), haddock (Melanogrammus aeglefinus), saithe (Pollachius virens), redfish (Sebastes marinus), herring (Clupea harengus), blue whiting (Micromesistius poutassou), capelin (Mallotus villosus), monk fish (Lophius piscatorius), and Greenland halibut (Reinhardtius hippoglossoides).

The Iceland Sea inhabits five different species of invertebrates being the northern shrimp (Pandalus borealis), Norway lobster (Nephrops norvegicus), the Iceland scallop (Chlamys islandica), the ocean quahog (Arctica islandica), and the common welk (Buccinum undatum).

Regarding marine mammals, there are eighteen species of cetaceans present such as whales, dolphins and porpoises are present, as well a seven species of pinnipeds such as seals and walruses inhabit the Iceland Sea. Some of which being the minke whale (Balaenoptera acutorostrata), humpback whale (Megaptera novaeangliae), the blue whale (Balaenoptera musculus), the Atlantic white-sided dolphin (Lagenorhynchus acutus), the northern bottlenose (Hyperoodon ampullatus), the harbor seal (Phoca vitulina) and the grey seal (Halicoerus grypus).

== Climate change ==
The effects of climate change on the Iceland Sea have been substantial and are expected to persist. Particularly worrisome for the Iceland Sea is the phenomenon of ocean acidification, which poses a significant threat to marine life. There are already observable instances of rapid acidification in the Iceland Sea, where the rate of pH decline at the sea surface is higher than the global average, leading to the reduction of habitats for bivalves and numerous other organisms.

Warming of the Iceland Sea has also had notable impacts on its marine ecosystem, leading to changes in the distribution and abundance of various pelagic fish species, particularly the capelin and mackerel. Additionally, several benthic fish species such as the haddock and monk fish that were traditionally located along the south coast of Iceland, have extended their range being found more north, in the Iceland Sea. Such changes in environmental conditions have contributed to the decrease in sea bird and seal population presence, as well as habitat alterations for certain whale species found in the Iceland Sea.
