= Gamma Island (Greenland) =

Island in Greenland

Gamma Ø Nickname: Bjornesk Island
- Location within Greenland

Geography
- Location: Greenland Sea
- Coordinates: 77°50′N 19°53′W
- Area: 236 km^{2} (91 sq mi)
- Length: 38 km (23.6 mi)
- Width: 8 km (5 mi)
- Highest elevation: 293 m (961 ft)

Administration
- Greenland
- Zone: Northeast Greenland National Park

Demographics
- Population: 0

Gamma Island (Danish: Gamma Ø) also known as Bjornesk Island is a large uninhabited island of the Greenland Sea, Greenland. The island has an area of 236 km^{2} and an elevation of 293 meters. It lies south of Jokel Bay and southwest of the Danske Islands and is separated from the mainland by the Orleans Sound, on the other side of which lies Nordmarken.

== History ==
Gamma Island was named by the Mørkefjord expedition 1938–39 after the name of ship "Gamma" used by the expedition.

Map of Northeastern Greenland.

== See also ==
- List of islands of Greenland
- Mylonite
- Cataclasite
