= Lambert Land =

Land area in Greenland

- Location of Lambert Land in Greenland
- Interactive map of Lambert Land

Geography
- Coordinates: 79°15′N 20°30′W
- Adjacent to: Nioghalvfjerd Fjord; Greenland Sea; Jomfru Tidsfordriv Fjord; Zachariae Isstrom
- Area: 1,960 km^{2} (760 sq mi)
- Length: 65 km (40.4 mi)
- Width: 55 km (34.2 mi)
- Highest elevation: 1,023 m (3356 ft)
- Highest point: Trompeteren-Bastion

Administration
- Greenland
- Unincorporated area: Northeast Greenland National Park

Demographics
- Population: 0 (2021)
- Pop. density: 0/km^{2} (0/sq mi)
- Ethnic groups: none

Lambert Land is a land area —possibly a peninsula or an island— in King Frederick VIII Land, northeastern Greenland. Administratively it belongs to the Northeast Greenland National Park area.

== Geography ==
Lambert Land is bounded in the north by the Nioghalvfjerd Fjord, in the east by the Greenland Sea and in the south by the Zachariae Isstrom, beyond which rises Duke of Orleans Land. Jomfru Tidsfordriv Fjord is a small fjord in the eastern coast. Cape Drygalsky is its eastern headland. To the northeast lie the Gamle Jim Islands and to the southeast Jokel Bay. Lambert Land is largely unglaciated.

== History ==
Lambert Land was named by the 1906-1908 Denmark expedition after a name found in a 1718 map of an obscure Dutch whaler who had sighted that land in 1670.

Jørgen Brønlund, the last survivor of the ill-fated leading team of the Denmark expedition reached Lambert Land in the moonlight and his body was found there by Johan Peter Koch and Tobias Gabrielsen, a Greenlandic polar explorer, in mid March 1908. He had his diary and Hagen's cartographic sketches. Mylius-Erichsen and Hagen had died further north. Brønlund was buried at Kap Bergendahl in southeast Lambert Land, the spot where he was found, which is today known as Brønlund's Grave (Danish: Brønlunds Grav).

In 1980 archaeological remains of ancient Inuit dwellings were found.

Map of Northeastern Greenland.

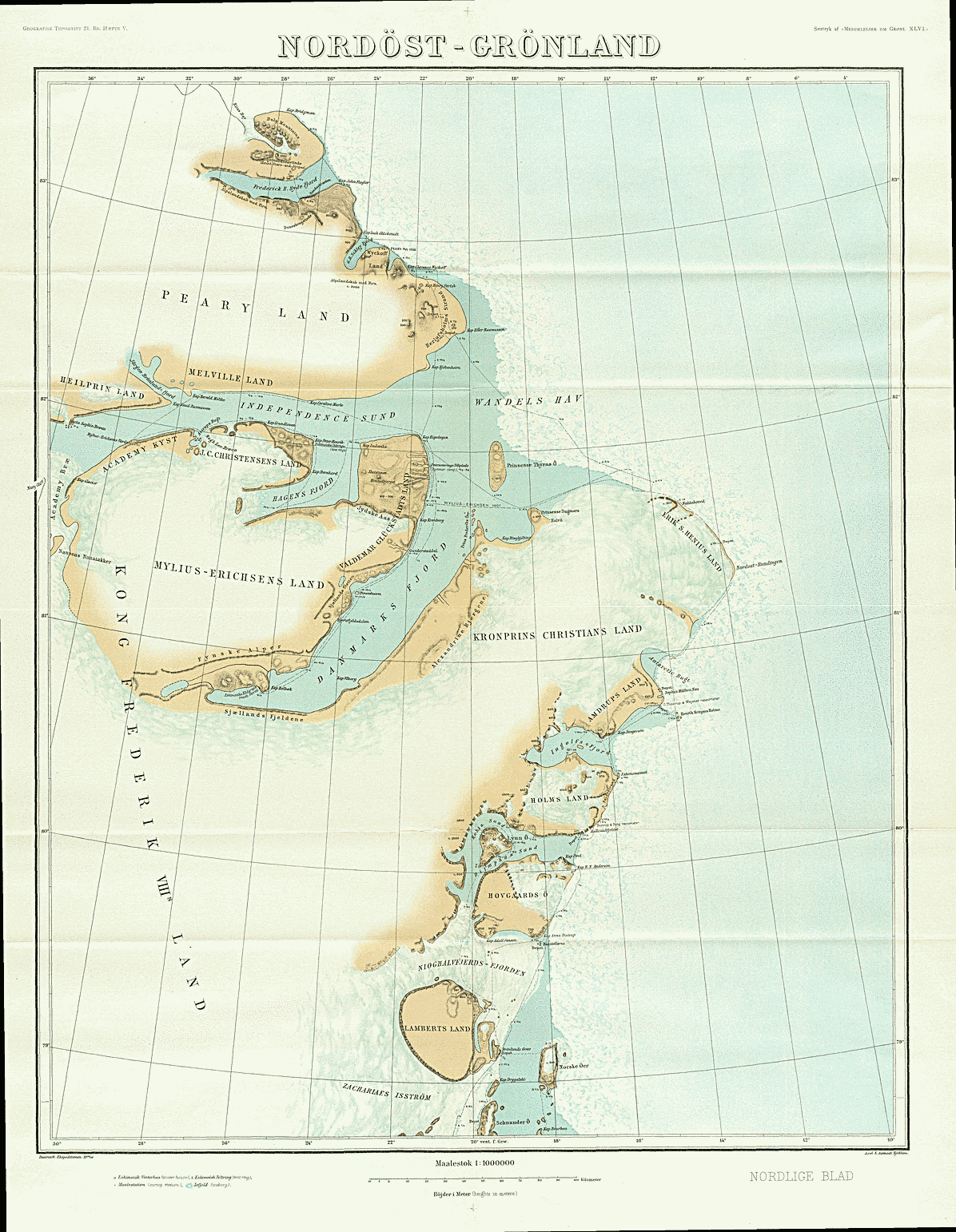
1911 German map of NE Greenland showing Lambert Land at the southern end.
