= Nunaoil =

National oil company of Greenland

- Company type: state-owned
- Industry: Oil and gas
- Founded: 1985
- Headquarters: Nuuk, Greenland
- Key people: Hans Kristian Olsen (MD)
- Products: Petroleum; Natural gas
- Owner: Government of Greenland
- Website: www.nunaoil.gl

Nunaoil was a national oil company of Greenland founded in 1985 as an equal partnership between the Greenland Home Rule Government and DONG Energy It is a non-paying partner in all licenses around Greenland. It handled oil exploration, while import of oil for local need is handled by Nukissiorfiit. Due to the decision of Greenland's Government in December 2022, Nunaoil has been reconstructed and renamed to NunaGreen in an effort to cease oil exploration and focus to renewable energy.

During the 1990s the company was primarily involved in collecting seismic data as operator of a group of international oil companies in the regions of North East and West Greenland. It then switched its focus to gathering seismic data along the South West coast of Greenland, mapping large potential hydrocarbon trapping accumulations. As of 2000 Nunaoil has stopped acquiring seismic data as there has been sufficient interest by the seismic industry as a whole in undertaking this task.

It has also been involved in the licensing rounds off the west coast of Greenland by Baffin Bay where it holds a minimum of 8.5% stake in all the blocks that have been licensed in the recent West Disko round.

In 2006 DONG Energy sold its shares in Nunaoil to the Danish State. According to the Act on Greenland Self-Government which came in force on 21 June 2009, the Danish State transferred its stake to the Government of Greenland.

Nunaoil has been ranked no. 66 in the Arctic Environmental Responsibility Index (AERI) that covers 120 oil, gas, and mining companies involved in resource extraction north of the Arctic Circle.

== See also ==
- Petroleum exploration in the Arctic
