= Johan Peter Koch =

Danish captain & explorer (1870–1928)

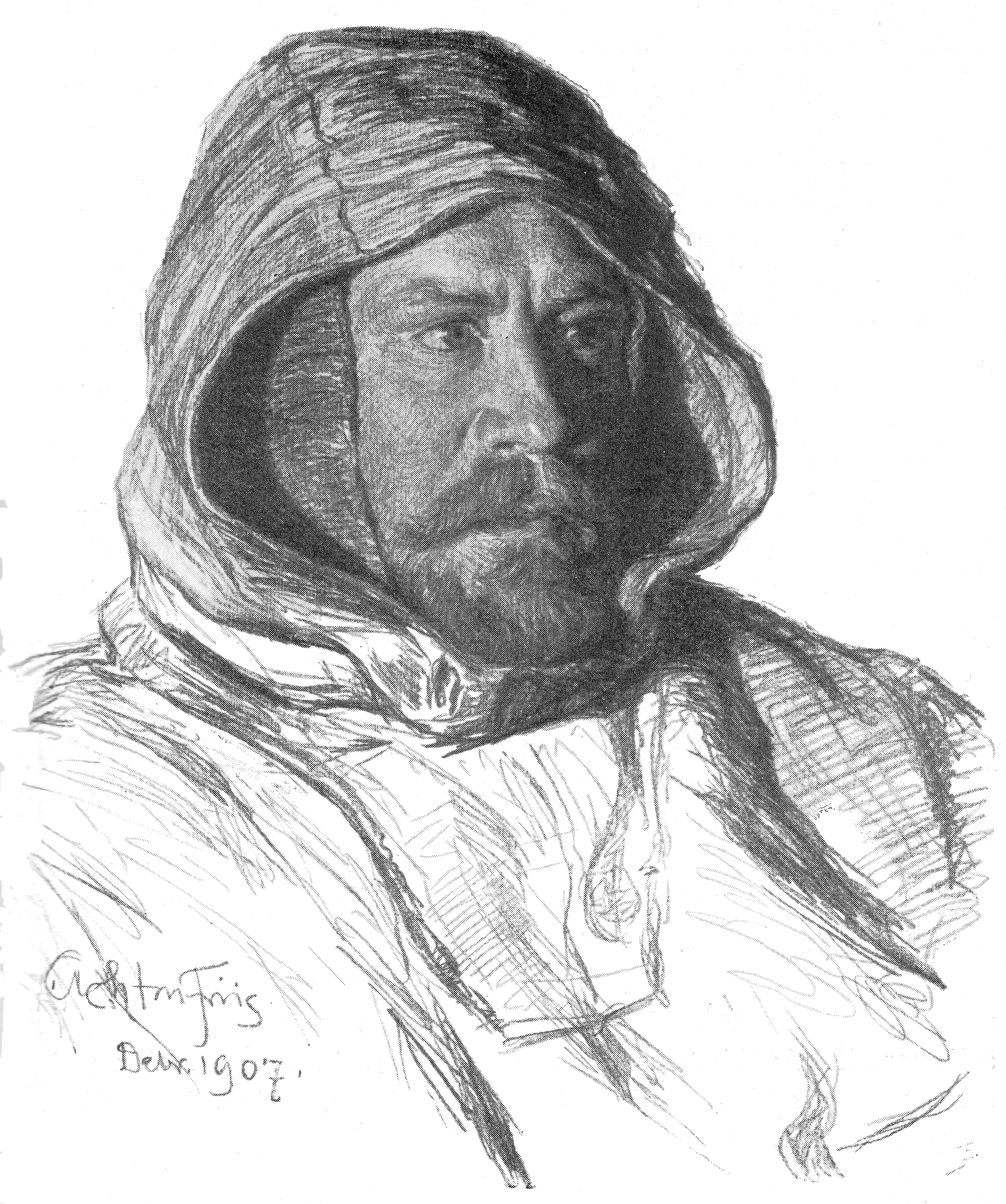
- Johan Peter Koch in 1907. Drawing by Achton Friis
- Born: 15 January 1870; Vestenskov, Kingdom of Denmark
- Died: 13 January 1928 (aged 57); Kingdom of Denmark
- Military career
- Service: Royal Danish Army
- Service years: 1885–1928
- Rank: Colonel
- Commands: Chief of the Army Air Corps
- Scientific career
- Awards: Order of the Dannebrog; Swedish Society for Anthropology and Geography; Carl-Ritter-Medaille
- Fields: Arctic exploration Cartography

Johan Peter Koch (15 January 1870 – 13 January 1928) was a Danish captain and explorer of the Arctic dependencies of Denmark, born at Vestenskov. He was the uncle of the geologist Lauge Koch.

== Career ==
J.P. Koch participated in Amdrup's expedition to east Greenland in 1900 and was one of the general staff of the surveying expeditions to Iceland in 1903–1904.

In 1906–1908 he was a member of the ill-fated Denmark expedition led by Ludvig Mylius-Erichsen, which mapped the last pieces of the northeastern coast of Greenland. On the death of Mylius-Erichsen and two others on a long sled voyage from Danmarkshavn to Peary Land, Koch along with the Greenlander Tobias Gabrielsen searched for the lost party, and found only the Greenlander Jørgen Brønlund on whose body were recovered the charts hand drawn by Niels Peter Høeg Hagen which completed the map of Greenland.

In 1907 Koch, together with Aage Bertelsen, was reported to have first seen Fata Morgana Land (Danish: Fata Morgana Landet), a phantom island supposedly lying between NE Greenland and Svalbard. This elusive land was allegedly seen as well by Lauge Koch from the air in 1933.

Koch later led the 1912–13 Danish Expedition to Queen Louise Land, a sled expedition across the inland ice of Greenland, also known as the "1912-13 Danish Expedition to Queen Louise Land and across North Greenland’s Inland Ice," with Alfred Wegener, Vigfús Sigurðsson, and Lars Larsen.

== Honours ==
Koch received, among other honors, the Vega medal of the Swedish Society for Anthropology and Geography. He also became a member of the International Polar Commission.

J.P. Koch Land 72°35′N 54°15′W in north-west Greenland was named after him. This ice-free peninsula is bounded by the Greenland Ice Sheet on the west side. There, next to the glacier, is Pingut mountain, which is the highest mountain in this land and also the northernmost basalt mountain in Greenland. On the north side, J.P. Koch land is bounded by Upernavik Icefjord, in the west and south by Eqaluarssuit Fjord (sv). The land is about 1010 square-km in area.

The J.P. Koch Glacier was named in his honour.

== Publications ==
- Meddelelser om Grønland, xxvi, xlvii (50 volumes, Copenhagen, 1876–1912)

== See also ==
- Cartographic expeditions to Greenland
