= Zachariæ Isstrøm =

Glacier in Greenland

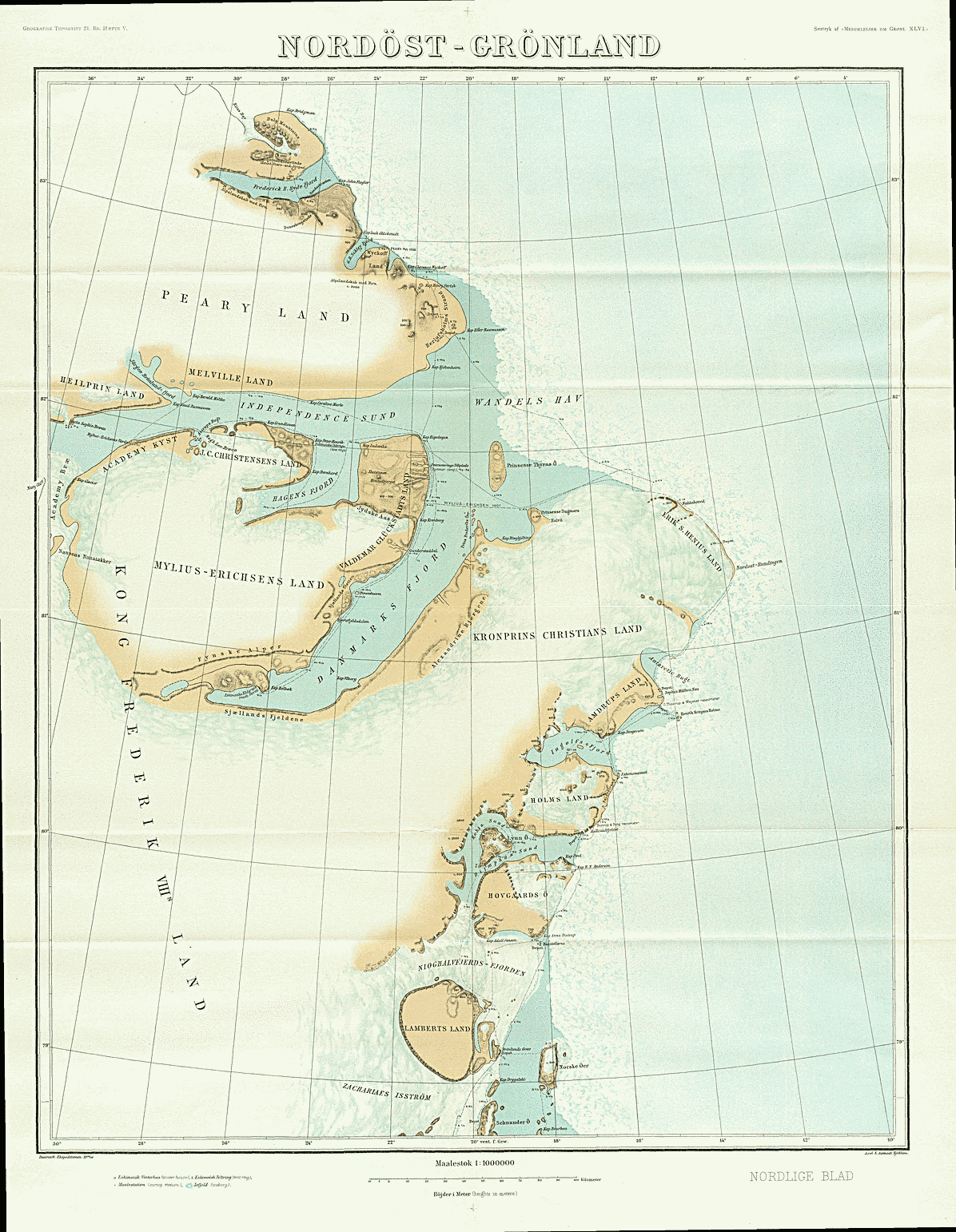
- 1911 map with the Zachariæ Isstrøm at the bottom

- Location within Greenland
- Type: Piedmont glacier
- Location: Greenland
- Coordinates: 78°55′N 21°10′W
- Area: 91,780 km^{2} (35,440 sq mi)
- Width: 26 km (16 mi)
- Terminus: Jøkel Bay, Greenland Sea; North Atlantic Ocean

Zachariæ Isstrøm (Isstrøm meaning ice stream in Danish) is a large glacier located in King Frederick VIII Land, northeast Greenland.

This glacier was named by the Denmark expedition 1906–08 after Georg Hugh Robert Zachariæ (1850–1937), an officer of the Danish Navy.

== Geography ==
It drains an area of 91,780 km^{2} (35,440 sq mi) of the Greenland Ice Sheet with a flux (quantity of ice moved from the land to the sea) of 11.7 km^{3} (2.8 cu mi) per year, as calculated for 1996, increasing to 15 km^{3} (3.6 cu mi) in 2015. The glacier holds a 0.5-meter sea-level rise equivalent.

Zachariae Isstrøm has its terminus in the northern part of Jøkel Bay, south of Lambert Land and north of Nørreland, near the Achton Friis Islands. It terminates into an embayment previously packed with multi-year calf ice.

=== Glacier retreat ===
Zachariæ Isstrøm broke loose from a stable position in 2012 and entered a phase of accelerated retreat as predicted in 2008.

From a state of approximate mass balance until 2003 it is now losing mass at about 5 Gt/yr. The ice velocity increased by 50% in 2000–2014. In 2012 it detached from a stabilizing sill and retreated rapidly along a downward-sloping, marine-based bed with substantial calving.

== See also ==
- List of glaciers in Greenland
