= Kronprins Christian Basin =

Offshore region of northeastern Greenland

Kronprins Christian basin is a region offshore northeastern Greenland. The region is especially known for its possible large resources of petroleum, with prospective resources of over 10 billion barrels of oil equivalent. The region belongs to Denmark.

== External links and further reading ==
- "Assessment of Undiscovered Oil and Gas Resources of the East Greenland Rift Basins Province" Gautier, D.L., 2007, Assessment of undiscovered oil and gas resources of the East Greenland Rift Basins Province: U.S. Geological Survey Fact Sheet 2007–3077, 4 p.
