= Achton Friis =

Danish illustrator, painter, and writer (1871–1939)

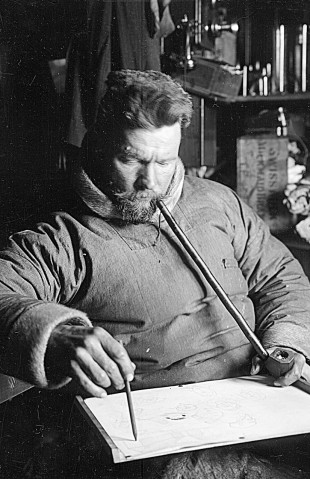
- Achton Friis photographed on the Denmark expedition to Greenland
- Born: Johannes Achton Friis; 5 September 1871; Trustrup, Denmark
- Died: 17 December 1939 (aged 68); Copenhagen, Denmark
- Resting place: Vestre Cemetery (Copenhagen)
- Education: Royal Danish Academy of Art
- Known for: Painting
- Awards: Medal of Merit

Achton Friis (5 September 1871 – 17 December 1939) was a Danish illustrator, painter and writer. He participated in the Denmark expedition to Northeast Greenland in 1906–1908, creating a large number of works in the process, both landscape paintings and portraits, as well as a written account which was published in 1909. He later published several comprehensive and richly illustrated works with descriptions of the nature and cultural history of different parts of Denmark. In addition, he designed decorative works for the Bing & Grøndahl porcelain manufacturer.

He is buried at Vestre Cemetery in Copenhagen. His son, Claus Achton Friis, was also a painter and graphic artist.

== Early life and education ==
Friis was born in Trustrup on the Djursland peninsula in 1871. He attended the Royal Danish Academy of Fine Arts in Copenhagen from 1895 to 1899. He learned etching techniques from Carl Locher in 1900–01.

== Danish Expedition to Greenland, 1906-08 ==
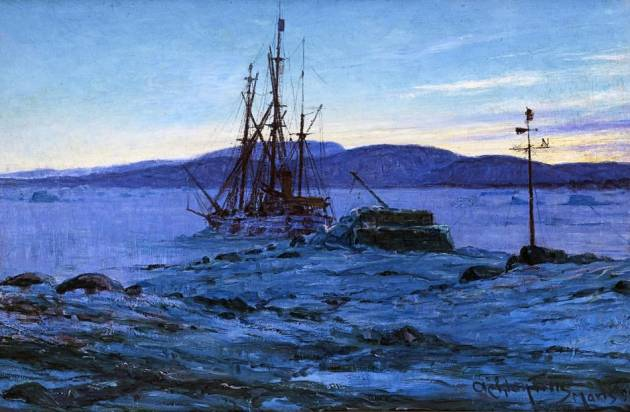
The expedition ship Denmark at sunset painted by Friis in early 1907

In 1906–08, Friis participated in the Denmark expedition to northeastern Greenland. His works included oil paintings of landscapes as well as numerous portraits.

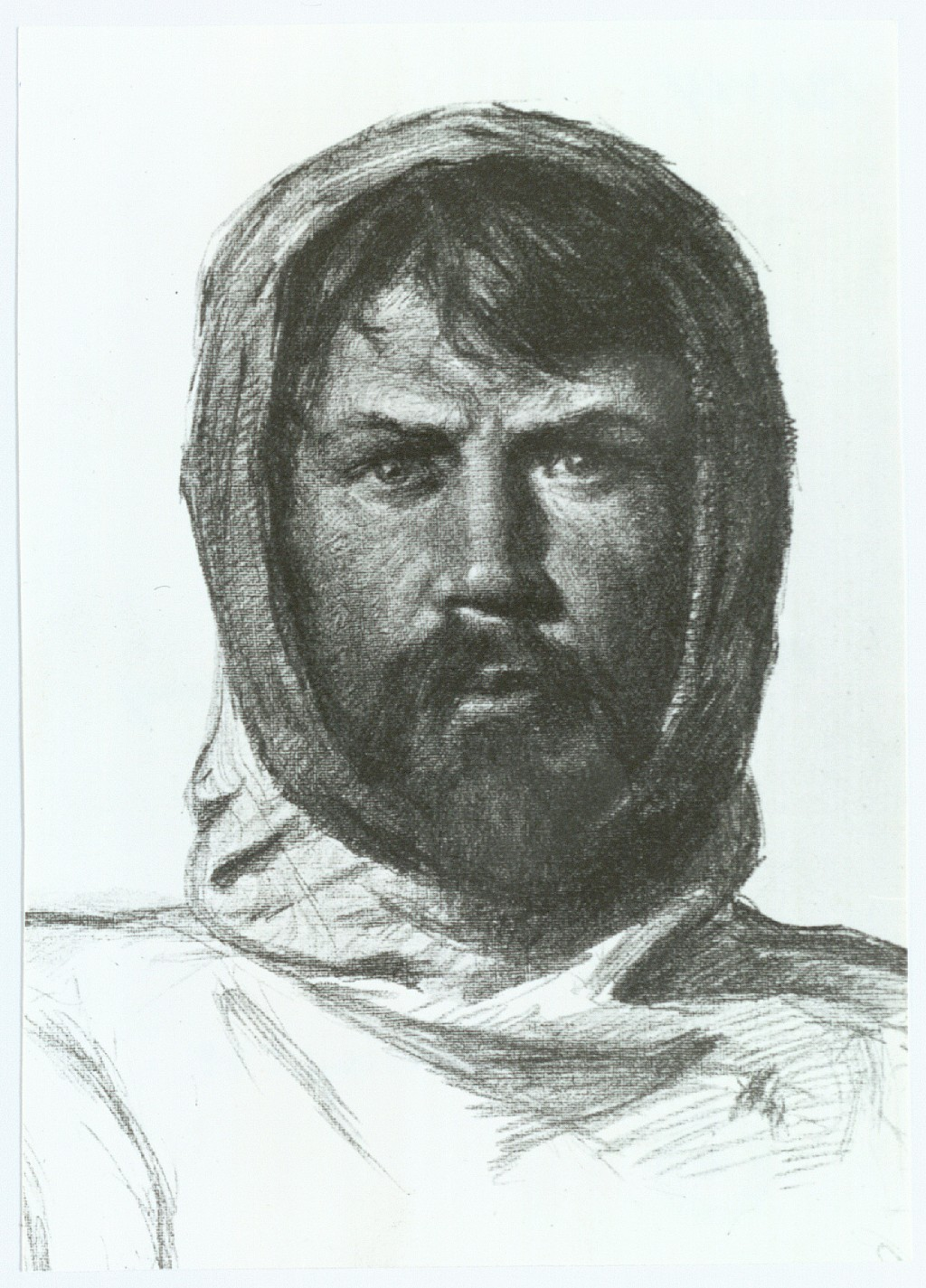
A portrait of Ludvig Mylius-Erichsen, the expedition's leader, who died on it

Friis' works from the expedition included landscape paintings as well as numerous portraits, both of expedition members and local Inuit. Another artist, Aage Bertelsen, was also a member of the expedition. Friis' and Bertelsen's works from the Denmark expedition were featured in an exhibition at the Rudolph Tegner Museum in 2011.

Friis also wrote the official travel account from the expedition, Danmark Ekspeditionen til Grønlands Nordøstkyst, which was published in 1909 and reissued in 2005. Friis and Aage Bertelsen's works from the Denmark expedition to Greenland's North-East Coast was featured in an exhibition at the Rudolph Tegner Museum in 2011. A comprehensive extract from Friis' and Bertelsen's diaries was published in 2013.

== Land of the Danes ==
In the 1920s and 1930s, Friis published three comprehensive works with descriptions of the nature and cultural history of different parts of Denmark. They are collectively referred to as De Danskes Land (Land of the Danes).

The 1200-page De Danskes Øer. Ekspeditionen til de 132 øer ("The Danes' Islands: Expedition to the 132 Islands") was published in three volumes between 1926 and 1928. In 1932–33, it was followed by the two-volume De Jyders Land ("Land of the Jutlanders") about Jutland. In 1936–1937, Friis published Danmarks Store Øer ("Denmark's Large Islands") in two volumes.

All three works contain illustrations by Friis as well as by Johannes Larsen. Andreas Friis and Knud Kyhn also contributed illustrations to Danmarks Store Øer.

== Work for Bing & Grøndahl ==
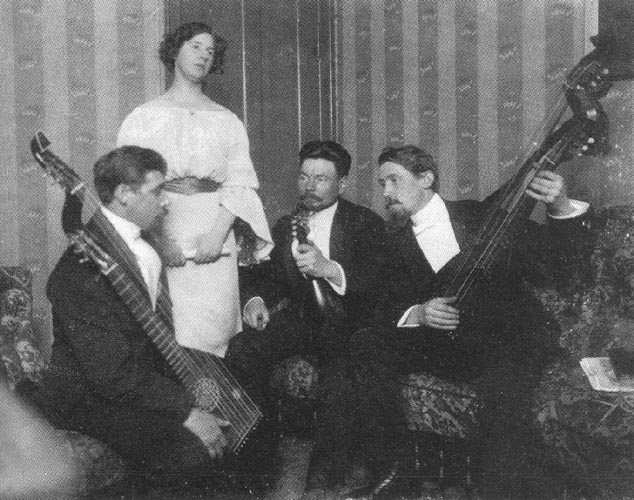
The Achton Friis Trio

He designed ceramics and porcelain for Bing & Grøndahl. His designs included a number of their Christmas plates in the 1920s and 1930s.

== Music career ==
Friis also played the mandolin and mandola. His threesome, the Achton Friis Trio, was completed by Johan Tolstrup on mandolin and by Frederik Birket-Smith on theorbo.

== Honours ==
Friis received the Medal of Merit. The Achton Friis Islands, as well as Cape Achton Friis, a headland in Queen Louise Land, were named in his honour.
