= Arctic Environmental Responsibility Index =

The Arctic Environmental Responsibility Index (AERI) is a ranking of environmental responsibility based on a survey among 173 members of the International Panel on Arctic Environmental Responsibility (IPAER), whose input is processed using segmented string relative ranking (SSRR) which is similar to the PageRank algorithm used by the Google search engine and applicable to social science disciplines, especially economics, sociology, and political science. The index's creators hope it can work as a self-governance tool. It covers 120 oil, gas, and mining companies involved in resource extraction north of the Arctic Circle in Alaska, Canada, Greenland, Finland, Norway, Russia, and Sweden. Its objectivity and reliability have been debated, even from within the industry.

== Ranking ==
Top ranked companies

Rank	Company	Country
1	Equinor	Norway
2	Total	France
3	Aker BP	Norway
4	ConocoPhillips	United States
5	BP	England
6	ExxonMobil	United States
7	eni	Italy
8	Anglo American	England
9	Repsol	Spain
