= Lauge Koch =

Danish geologist and Arctic explorer (1892–1964)

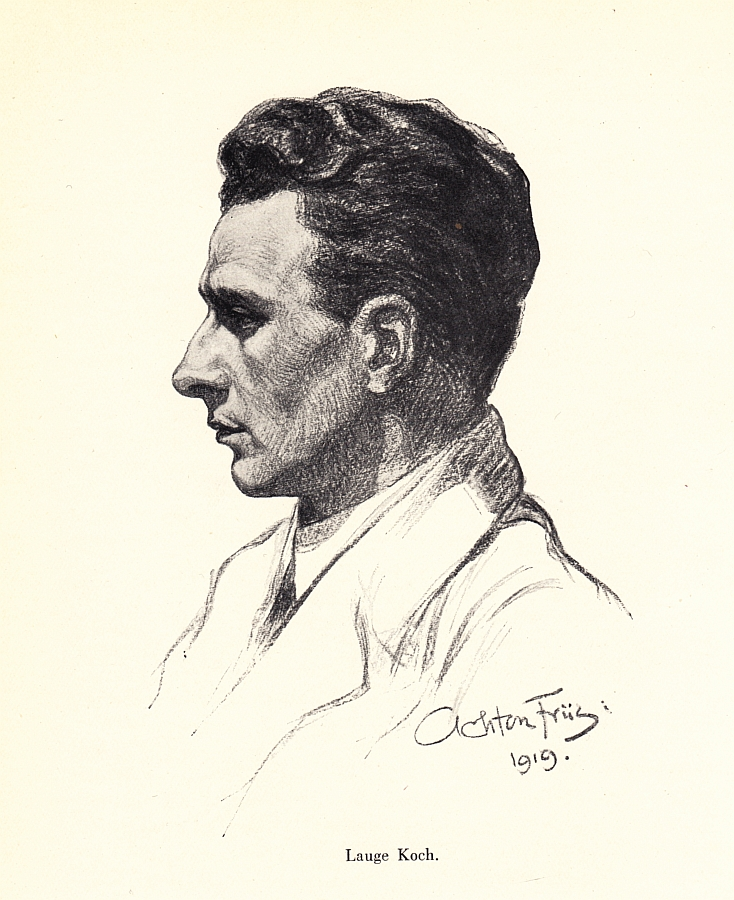
- Lauge Koch
- Born: 5 July 1892
- Died: 5 June 1964 (aged 71)
- Occupations: geologist and Arctic explorer
- Known for: Danish government expeditions to Greenland
- Relatives: Johan Peter Koch (cousin)

Lauge Koch (5 July 1892 – 5 June 1964) was a Danish geologist and Arctic explorer.

== Biography ==
Lauge Koch was born in 1892 to Karl and Elisabeth Koch. His development as a scientist was greatly influenced by his father's second cousin Johan Peter Koch - a polar explorer, a member of several Greenland expeditions, including Ludvig Mylius-Erichsen's and Alfred Wegener's (in the latter's expedition (1912-1913) to cross Greenland, he led a sledging party). He received his higher education at the University of Copenhagen, where he began his studies in 1911, in 1920 he received a master's degree, and in 1929 a doctor's degree, having defended a dissertation on the topic "Stratigraphy of Greenland".

He was the renowned leader of 24 Danish government expeditions to Greenland, and the central character in the Lauge Koch Controversy, an international and intra-national conflict. Beginning in December 1935 a bitter conflict arose between Koch and eleven of the most prominent Danish geologists of the day, including O. B. Bøggild, director of The Mineralogical Museum and professor at the Geological Institute of Copenhagen University, and Victor Madsen, head of the Geological Survey of Denmark.

Controversy started with a review of the Lauge Koch book Geologie von Grönland (1935) written by ‘the eleven’ and accusing Koch of poor and improper scientific practice. Relating to the years 1921–23 in which Lauge Koch conducted the Bicentenary Jubilee Expedition to North Greenland in the year of the bicentennial jubilee of Hans Egede's landing in Greenland, Koch made a sledge journey along the north coast of Greenland, round Peary Land and back across the Inland Ice. On this journey Koch discovered a depression which in his opinion was the one that Robert Peary in 1892 had mistaken for a channel —the so-called "Peary Channel". Koch's observations of the interior of Independence Fjord led to considerable cartographic changes compared with the Peter Freuchen map of 1912.

In 1922 he mapped Hiawatha Glacier, and noted that the glacier tongue extended into Lake Alida (near Foulk Fjord).

In 1938, Lauge Koch found in the mountains west of Jameson Land, near Scoresby Sound, the skeleton of a huge extinct mammal similar to the head of a gigantic animal with huge teeth found by Professor Selim Hassan in 1935 near the pyramid of Chephren. The skeleton found by Koch was displayed at the museum in Copenhagen.

Amongst his other contributions to the sciences, in the mid-1930s Koch established a network of field stations and traveling huts in Central East Greenland. This establishment of a permanent infrastructure in the field caused a change in the whole culture and organization of Danish Arctic exploration.

His last expedition was the 1956-58 Expedition to East Greenland in which he used helicopters. But the Danish government cut funding in mid-expedition and Koch's career as expedition leader was terminated.

== Legacy ==
The mineral kochite which is found in Mt Hvide Ryg, Werner Bjerge, and the former Greenland county of Tunu was named for Koch in honor of his explorations in the same areas.

The coelacanth Laugia from the Early Triassic of Greenland is named in his honor.

== Honours ==
Koch was awarded an Honorary Fellowship from the American Geographical Society in 1924, its Daly Medal in 1930, as well as the Vega medal of the Swedish Society for Anthropology and Geography. In 1927 he was awarded the Patron's Medal of the British Royal Geographical Society for his work in Greenland and the Hans Egede Medal of the Royal Danish Geographical Society. In 1949 he was awarded the Mary Clark Thompson Medal from the National Academy of Sciences.

== See also ==
- Cartographic expeditions to Greenland
- Three-year Expedition (Treårsekspedition)
- Peary Channel

== Bibliography ==
- Ries, Christopher J. (2002). "Lauge Koch and the Mapping of North East Greenland". In Bravo, M.; Sörlin, S (eds.). Narrating the Arctic: A Cultural History of Nordic Scientific Practices. Canton, MA: Science History Publications. pp. 199–231. ISBN 978-0-88135-385-3.
- Hansen, K. G. (2012). "Koch, Lauge". In Nuttall, M. (ed.). Encyclopedia of the Arctic. Vol. 2. New York: Routledge. pp. 1103–1105. ISBN 978-1-136-78680-8.
- Higgins, A.K.; Gilotti, J.A.; Smith, M.P., eds. (2008). The Greenland Caledonides: Evolution of the Northeast Margin of Laurentia. Volume 202 of Geological Society of America Memoir. Penrose Place: Geological Society of America. ISBN 978-0-8137-1202-4.
- Dunbar, Carl O. (1966-08-01). "MEMORIAL TO LAUGE KOCH (1892–1964)". GSA Bulletin. 77 (8): P145–P154. doi:10.1130/0016-7606(1966)77[P145:MTLK]2.0.CO;2. ISSN 0016-7606.
- Mills, W. J. (2003). "Koch, Lauge". Exploring Polar Frontiers: A Historical Encyclopedia. Vol. 1. Santa Barbara: ABC-CLIO. pp. 360–363. ISBN 978-1-57607-422-0.
