= Jøkel Bay =

Bay in Greenland

- Jøkelbugten
- Location in Greenland
- Location: Arctic
- Coordinates: 78°25′N 20°20′W
- Ocean/sea sources: Greenland Sea
- Basin countries: Greenland
- Max. length: 140 km (87 mi)
- Max. width: 40 km (25 mi)
- Frozen: All year round
- Settlements: 0

Jøkel Bay (Danish: Jøkelbugten) is a large bay in North Eastern Greenland. The area of the bay is uninhabited. Administratively Jøkel Bay and its surroundings belong to the Northeast Greenland National Park.

The bay was named after an old Norse word for glacier —Icelandic: Jökull— by the ill-fated Denmark expedition.

Jøkel Bay is clogged by fast ice the year round.

== Geography ==
Jøkel Bay stretches for about 140 kilometers from north to south in the King Frederick VIII Land shore.

Lambert Land and Schnauder Island lie at the northern end by the Zachariae Isstrom glacier, while Duke of Orleans Land and Gamma Island are at the southern end. All along the shore of the bay the Greenland ice sheet reaches down to the sea between skerries and the coast is broken down into two alignments of small islands.

The Pic de Gerlache, an important landmark for the first explorers of the area, rises from a nunatak a few kilometers inland in the central zone of the bay.

Map of Northeastern Greenland
