= Greenland Sea =

Body of water

- Grøndlandshavet
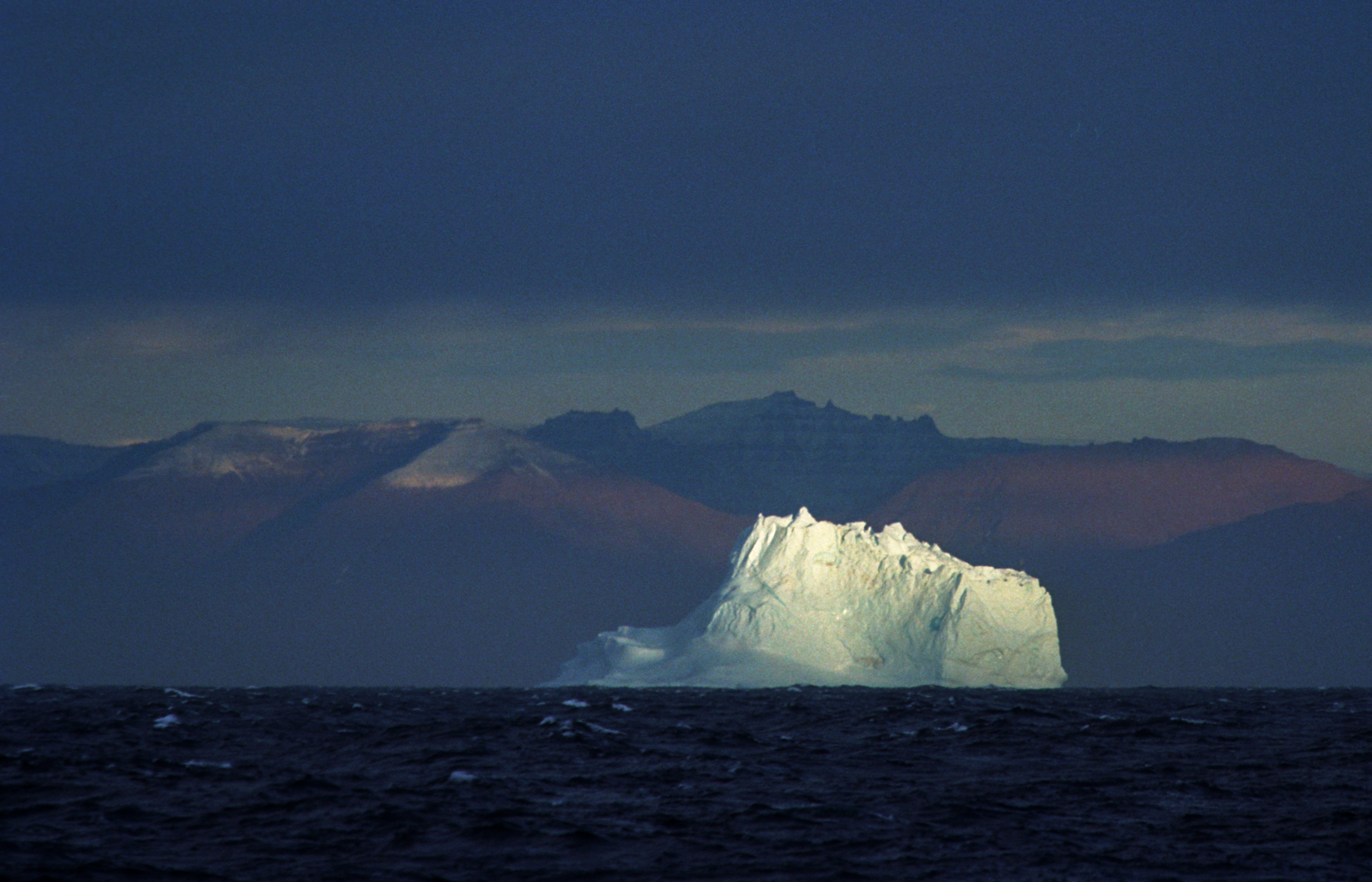
- Greenland Sea iceberg

- Location within Greenland

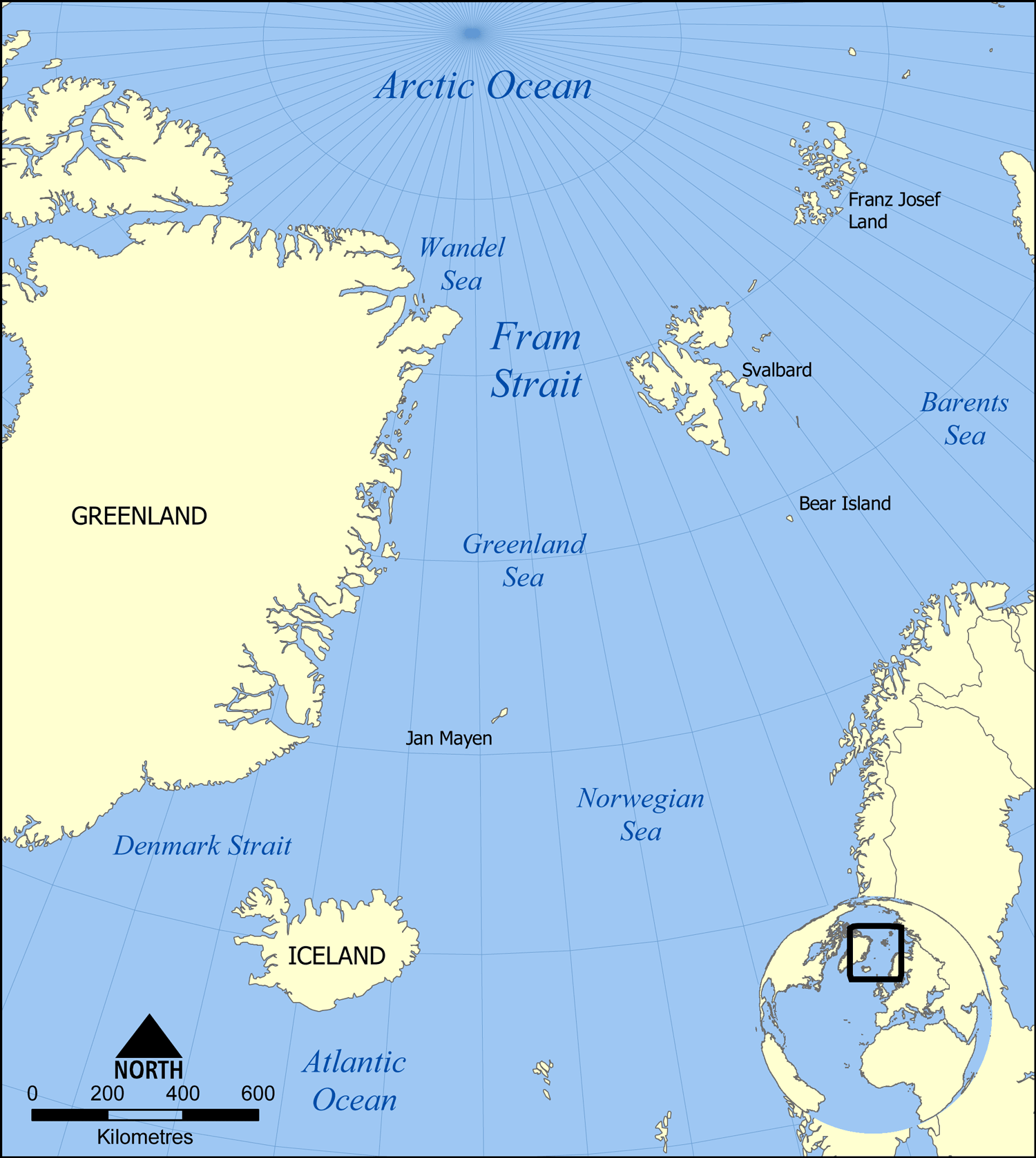
- Location: Northern America and Northern Europe
- Coordinates: 76°N 8°W
- Type: Sea
- Basin countries: Greenland, Iceland, and Norway
- Surface area: 1,205,000 km^{2} (465,300 sq mi)
- Average depth: 1,444 m (4,738 ft)
- Max. depth: 4,846 m (15,899 ft)
- Water volume: 1,747,250 km^{3} (419,000 cu mi)

The Greenland Sea (Danish: Grønlandshavet) is a body of water that borders Greenland to the west, the Svalbard archipelago to the east, Fram Strait and the Arctic Ocean to the north, and the Norwegian Sea and Iceland to the south. The Greenland Sea is often defined as part of the Arctic Ocean, sometimes as part of the Atlantic Ocean. However, definitions of the Arctic Ocean and its seas tend to be imprecise or arbitrary. In general usage, the term "Arctic Ocean" would exclude the Greenland Sea. In oceanographic studies, the Greenland Sea is considered part of the Nordic Seas, along with the Norwegian Sea. In oceanography, the Arctic Ocean and Nordic Seas are often referred to collectively as the "Arctic Mediterranean Sea", a marginal sea of the Atlantic.

The sea has Arctic climate with regular northern winds and temperatures rarely rising above 0 °C (32 °F). It previously contained the Odden ice tongue (or Odden) area, which extended eastward from the main East Greenland ice edge in the vicinity of 72–74°N during the winter and acted as a key winter ice formation area in the Arctic. The West Ice forms in winter in the Greenland Sea, north of Iceland, between Greenland and Jan Mayen island. It is a major breeding ground of harp seal and hooded seal that has been used for seal hunting for more than 200 years.

== Extent ==
The International Hydrographic Organization defines the limits of the Greenland Sea as follows:

On the North. A line joining the Northernmost point of Spitzbergen [sic] [Svalbard] to the Northernmost point of Greenland.

On the East. The West coast of West Spitzbergen [sic] [island of Spitsbergen].

On the Southeast. A line joining the Southernmost point of West Spitzbergen [sic] to the Northern point of Jan Mayen Island, down the West coast of that island to its Southern extreme, thence a Line to the Eastern extreme of Gerpir (67°05′N, 13°30′W) [sic, actually at 65°05′N 13°30′W] in Iceland.

On the Southwest. A line joining Straumnes (NW extreme of Iceland) to Cape Nansen (68°15′N 29°30′W) in Greenland.

On the West. The East and Northeast coast of Greenland between Cape Nansen and the northernmost point.

== History ==
While the sea has been known for millennia,, its first scientific explorations were conducted in 1765 and 1766 as part of two Russian government expeditions under the command of Admiral V. Chichagov, who, in search of a passage north of Greenland through the Arctic, carried out oceanographic, geophysical and meteorological observations according to a special program developed by M. Lomonosov, studied currents and ice drift in the northern Greenland Sea, took soil samples, and measured depths in many places. A number of scientific investigations were carried out in 1876–1878 as part of the Norwegian North-Atlantic Expedition. Since then, many countries, mostly Norway, Iceland and Russia have sent scientific expeditions to the area. The complex water current system in the Greenland Sea was described in 1909 by Fridtjof Nansen.

The Greenland Sea was a popular hunting ground for the whaling industry for 300 years, until 1911, primarily based in Spitsbergen. At that point, the formerly rich whale population here, was so depleted that the industry was no longer profitable. The remaining whales of the Greenland Sea has been protected ever since, but the populations have not shown any proof of significant regeneration. Since the late 1990s, polar biologists reports an increase in the local bowhead whale population and in 2015, arctic scientists discovered a surprising abundance of them in a small area. These results may be interpreted as an early sign of a beginning recovery for this particular species, that once formed the largest bowhead population in the world, at an estimated 52,000 whales.

The Inuit hunted whales on a non-industrial scale in the Greenland Sea since the 15th century, as evidenced by archaeology.

The first complete man-powered crossing of the Greenland Sea was achieved in 2017 by rowing expedition, Polar Row led by Fiann Paul.

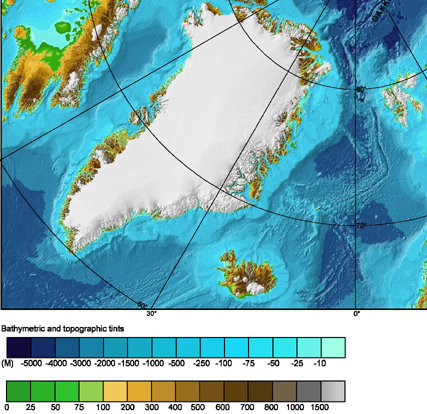
Sea topography

== Geography and geology ==
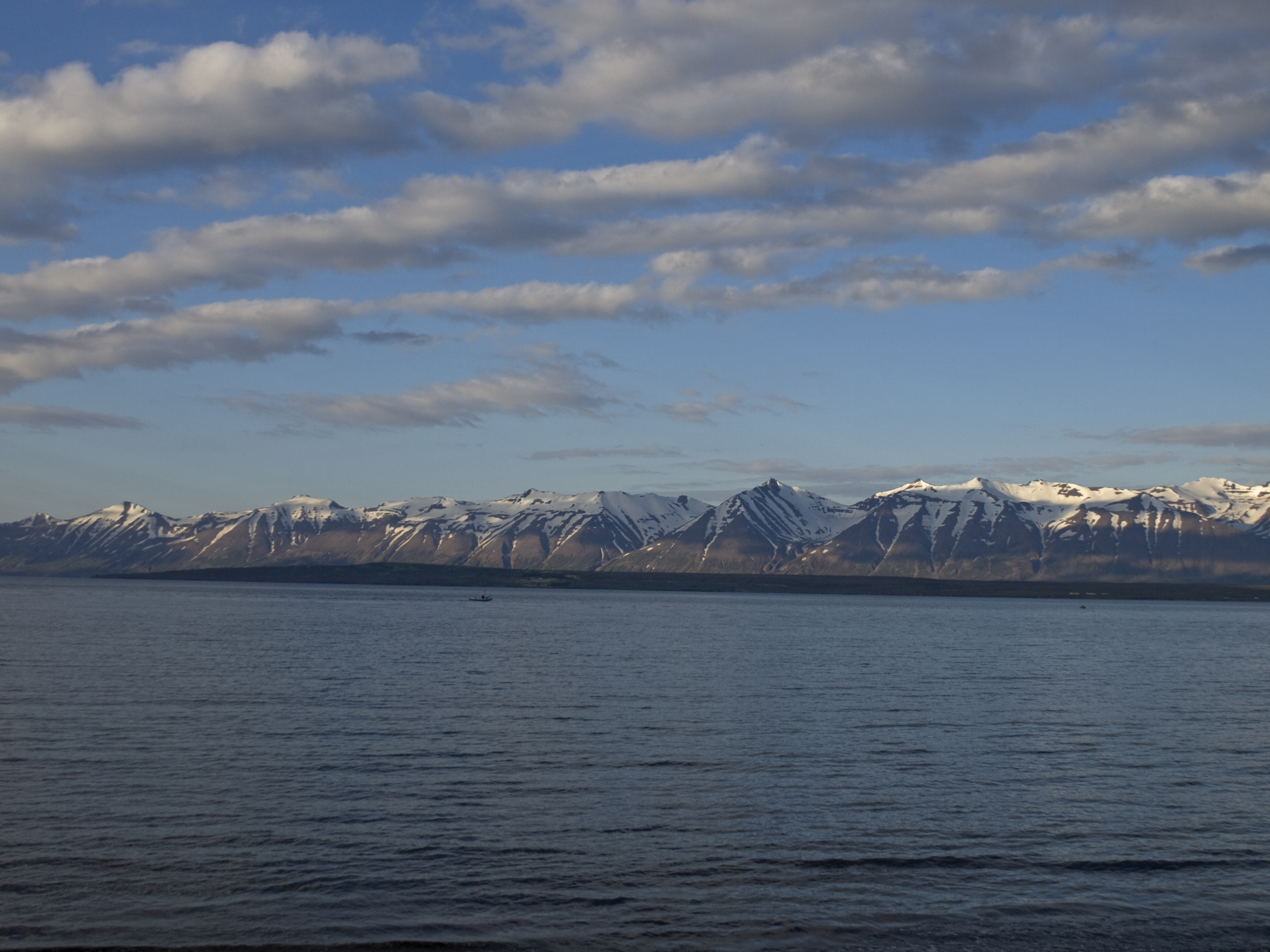
Eyjafjörður, the longest fjord in Northern Iceland, belongs to the Greenland Sea.

The Greenland Sea is bounded to the west by the island of Greenland, and to the south by the Denmark Strait and Iceland. To the southeast, behind the Jan Mayen island (Norway) lies the vast expanse of the Norwegian Sea, of which Greenland Sea may be considered an extension. Across the Fram Strait to the northeast, the sea is delimited by the Svalbard archipelago (Norway). The southern part of the Greenland Sea, roughly the area south of the Jan Mayen Francture Zone or the line Cape Brewster – Jan Mayen is sometimes referred to as Iceland Sea.

The bottom of the Greenland Sea is a depression bounded to the south by the underwater Greenland-Iceland ridge and to the east by the Mohns Ridge and Knipovich Ridge (parts of the Mid-Atlantic Ridge). To the west, the bottom rises first slowly, but then rapidly toward the wide Greenland coastal strip. Silts fill the submarine hollows and gorges; silty sands, gravel, boulders, and other products of erosion coat the shelves and ridges.

Although the deepest point inside of the sea is 4,846 m (15,899 ft), depths down to 5,570 m (18,270 ft) have been measured in the Molloy Deep of the Fram Strait which connects the sea to the Arctic Ocean on the north. The Greenland ice sheet reaches down to the sea at Jøkel Bay.

Major islands of the Greenland Sea include the Svalbard archipelago, Jan Mayen as well as coastal islands off the NE Greenland shores, such as Hovgaard, Ella, Godfred Hansen, Île-de-France, Lynn, Norske, Gamma and Schnauder islands. Of those, only the Svalbard islands are inhabited, and Jan Mayen has only temporal military staff. After the League of Nations gave Norway jurisdiction over the island, in 1921 Norway opened the first meteorological station there, which was a subject of contention between Germany and United Kingdom during World War II. Several radio and meteorological stations operate on the island nowadays.

== Hydrology, climate, and ice ==
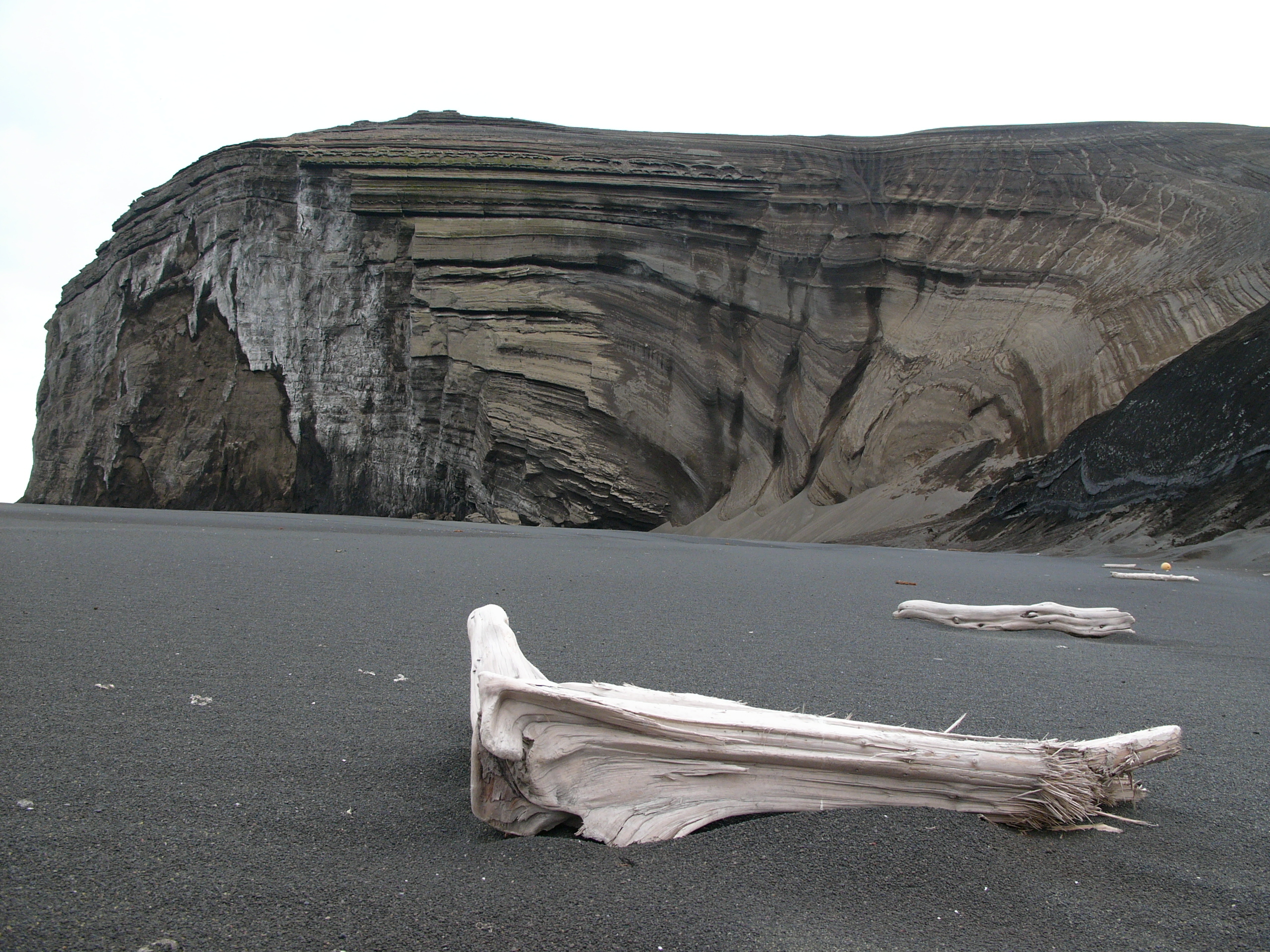
A beach on Jan Mayen island

The climate is Arctic and varies significantly across the vast sea area. Air temperatures fluctuate between −49 °C (−56 °F) near Spitsbergen in winter and 25 °C (77 °F) off Greenland in summer. Averages are −10 °C (14 °F) in the south and −26 °C (−15 °F) in the north in February, which is the coldest month. The corresponding values for the warmest month, August, are 5 °C (41 °F) in the south and 0 °C (32 °F) in the north. The summer is very short: The number of days per year when the temperature rises above 0 °C (32 °F) varies between 225 in the north to 334 in the south. The annual precipitation is 250 mm (10 in) in the north, but 500 mm (20 in) in the south.

Northern winds continue through the whole year, cooling the surface water and bringing ice to the south. The average surface water temperature is about −1 °C (30 °F) or lower in the north and 1–2 °C (34–36 °F) in the south; the corresponding summer temperatures are about 0 and 6 °C (32 and 43 °F) respectively. The bottom water temperatures are below −1 °C (30 °F). The surface water salinity is 3.30–3.45% in the eastern and below 3.20% in the western parts, increasing to 3.49% toward the bottom. The water is green. Tides are semidiurnal with the average height of 4.4 m (14.4 ft). Together with the water currents, they break up the floating ice sheets and mix various water layers both laterally and along the depth.

The progressively colder waters of North Atlantic Current sink in the Arctic Ocean, returning south in the form of cold East Greenland Current, an important part of the Atlantic conveyor belt, which flows along the western part of the sea. Along the eastern part flows the warm Spitsbergen Current, a part of Gulf Stream. Mixtures of cold, freshwater ice melt and the warm, salty Spitsbergen Current may experience cabbeling, which might contribute to thermohaline circulation. The combination of those currents creates a counter-clockwise water flow in the central part of the sea.

Because of frequent fogs, winds, and currents, which continuously transport ice and icebergs through the Greenland Sea to the south, the Greenland Sea has a narrow window for commercial navigation: The ice season starts in October and ends in August. Three types of floating ice are distinguished: Arctic pack ice (several meters thick), sea ice (about a meter thick), and freshwater icebergs.

=== West Ice ===
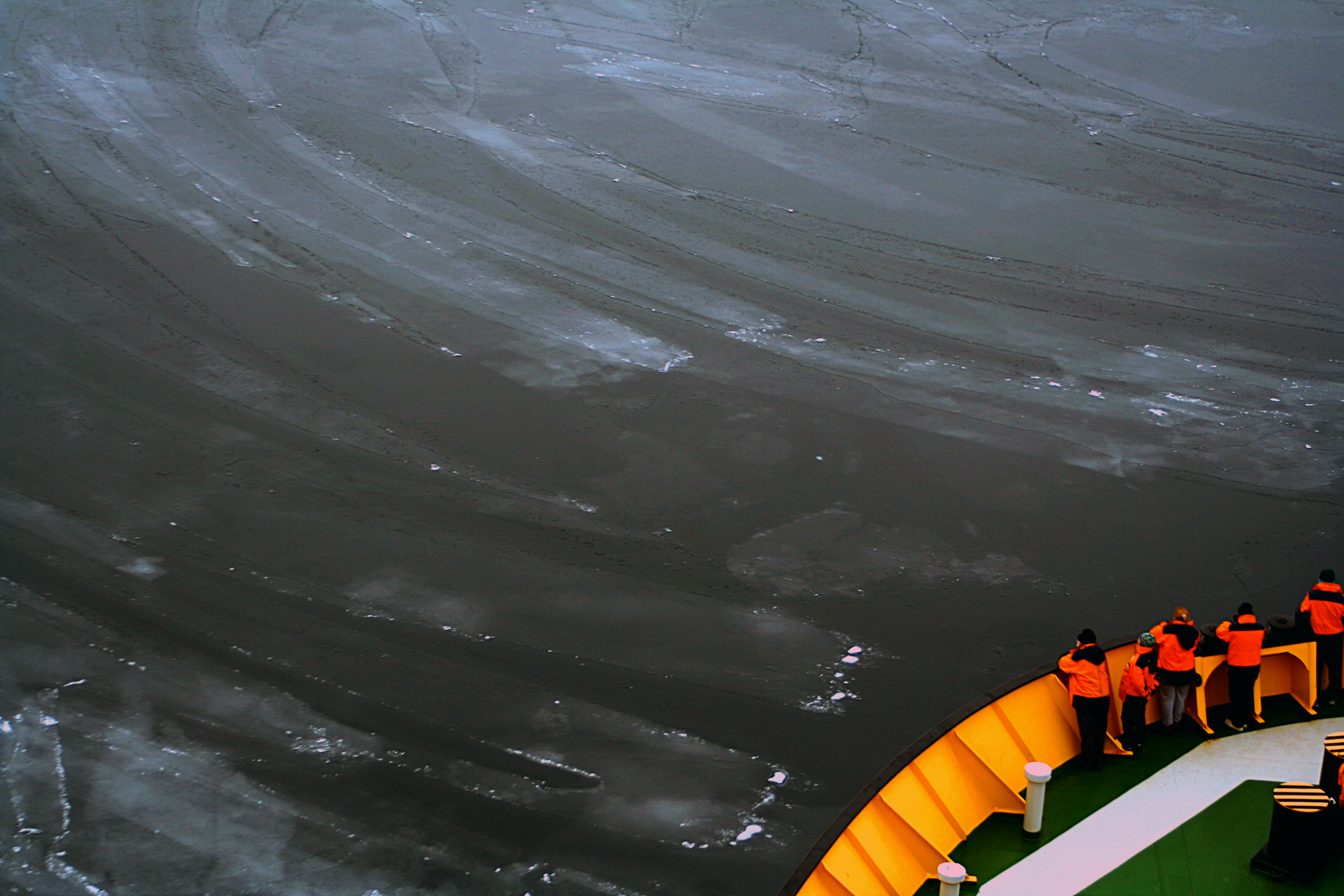
Frazil ice

In winter, a large area north of Iceland between Greenland and Jan Mayen, called West Ice, is covered by continuous ice. It is a major breeding ground for seals, including harp seal, hooded seal, and gray seal. It was discovered in the early 18th century by British whalers and since late 1750s was used for seal hunting. The hunting was especially intensive in the 19th century, but declined in the 20th century because of hunting restrictions and lower market demand. Around 5 April 1952, a major storm resulted in disappearance of ships with 79 Norwegian seal hunters on board. Seven other Norwegian seal hunting vessels shipwrecked the same month.

=== Odden ice tongue ===
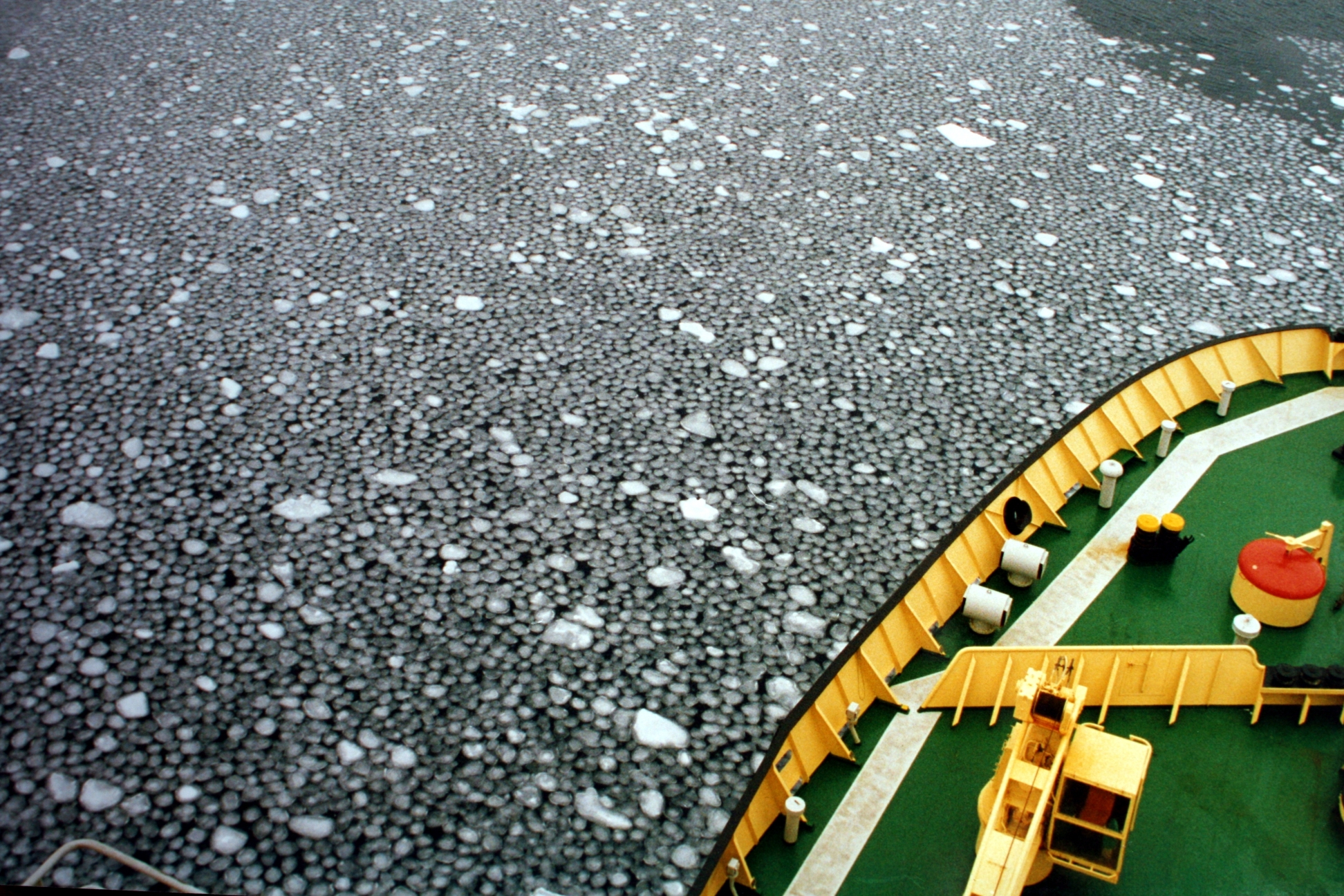
Pancake ice

The Odden ice tongue or simply the Odden (Odden is Norwegian word for headland) was a key winter ice formation area in the Arctic. It was known for a long time and was encountered by Fridtjof Nansen but was only fully understood with the advent of satellite imagery.

The Odden had a length of about 1,300 km (810 mi) and covered an area of up to 330,000 km^{2} (130,000 sq mi) in most years. It extended eastward from the main East Greenland ice edge in the vicinity of 72–74°N during the winter because of the presence of very cold polar surface water in the Jan Mayen Current, which diverts some water eastward from the East Greenland Current at that latitude. Most of the already formed ice continued floating south, driven by the wind, so a cold open water surface was exposed on which new ice formed as frazil ice and pancake ice in the rough seas, producing a giant tongue shape. The salt rejected back into the ocean from this ice formation caused the surface water to become denser and sink, sometimes to great depths (2,500 m (8,200 ft) or more), making this one of the few regions of the ocean where winter convection occurred, which helped drive the entire worldwide system of surface and deep currents known as the thermohaline circulation. Since the 1990s, the Odden ice tongue rarely develops.

=== Interactions with the global climate ===
Water from the Atlantic passes through the Greenland Sea and enters the Arctic ocean via Atlantic Meridional Overturning Circulation. The Greenland Sea is connected to these other oceans via eddies that redistribute warm water from the Atlantic Ocean and cold water from the Arctic Ocean. These eddies have been found to bring the temperature of the nearby regions of the ocean closer together, even as far away as the Indian Ocean, since 2000. These temperature changes have been linked to the slowing of water passing through the Greenland Sea from the Atlantic and Arctic oceans, however it is unclear how this flow might change in the future. This warming has also been linked to an increase in rains and monsoon intensity in India. Ice in the Greenland Sea has been recorded to be in decline as the water in the region has warmed. Reduction of sea ice in the Greenland Sea has been linked to increased volumes of precipitation that forms in the ocean around both India and Korea, precipitation intensity on Svalbard, and to temperature instability during summer in European Russia. Some of this melting is due to warming foehn winds from the northeast.

== Fauna ==
The Greenland Sea is densely inhabited by the organisms that form the base of the oceanic food chain. Large invertebrates, fish (such as cod, herring, redfish, halibut, and plaice), birds, and mammals (including various species of seals, whales, and dolphins) all feed on the smaller invertebrates and small organisms. Mosses, lichens, and scanty bushes around the coasts serve as food to the deer and musk oxen, which in turn are hunted by the polar bear.

The Greenland Sea was formerly home to a large population of various whale species, especially bowhead whales, but the whaling industry decimated them greatly from the beginning of the 1600s till 1911. In the last few decades there have been a few signs indicating a beginning recovery.

== Oil and gas ==
US Geological Survey has estimated that at least 13% of the world's undiscovered oil deposits and 30% of the world's undiscovered gas pockets are located in the Arctic, with the Greenland Sea potentially holding large amounts of natural gas and lesser amounts of natural gas liquids and crude oil. This has led the Greenland's minister and provincial council to offer a large number of off-shore concessions to potential hydrocarbon (oil and gas) extraction. The majority of the concessions are located in seas west of Greenland (primarily the Davis Strait and Baffin Bay), but with 19 concessions in the Greenland Sea.

In late 2013, a total of three consortia obtained hydrocarbon extraction rights to four large areas of the Greenland Sea from the Greenland Bureau of Mineral and Petroleum. The consortia are led by the oil companies of Statoil, Chevron, and Eni, but includes several other smaller companies such as Shell, BP, DONG Energy and Nunaoil. Since then, a fifth hydrocarbon concession has been sold. ExxonMobil, the largest oil company in the world and with a lot of experience in the Arctic, was also applying for oil extraction rights in the Greenland Sea initially, but pulled out in December 2013 for unexplained reasons, concentrating efforts on shale gas and the American market instead.

The Greenland Minister Council expected the first exploratory drills to take place some time in the 2020s. They estimated that a full preliminary program with seismic surveys, exploratory drills, and proper safety measures would have taken about 16 years and an investment of about US$500 million in each concession. However, as of 2021 the Greenland government stopped administering licenses for oil exploration.

== See also ==
- List of seas
