= Brønlundhus =

Radio station in Greenland

Coordinates: 82°10′30″N 30°40′06″W

Location within Greenland

Brønlundhus, on some maps also Brønlundfjord, is a former research station and radio station located on the western shore of Jørgen Brønlund Fjord in southern Peary Land, in northern Greenland. It is named after Greenlandic Arctic researcher Jørgen Brønlund, or after the namesake fjord on which it is located. It is close to the mouth of Jørgen Brønlund Fjord where it opens into Independence Fjord.

== History ==
Brønlundhus was built in 1947–48 by the Danish Peary Land Expeditions on initiative of Eigil Knuth, through an air lift by PBY Catalina seaplanes from Zackenbergbasen, a station built for that purpose close to a trapper's hut at the site of present Zackenberg research station area 1000 km farther south. Brønlundhus was the first station in Greenland with all equipment transported by airlift. The seaplanes could land in the fjord only during the ice-free period from mid-July to end of August.

Brønlundhus was used as a base for the first expedition 1948–50 when Peary Land was explored by scientists on dog sled. Until the establishment of Alert in Canada in 1950, Brønlundhus was the northernmost station in the world, not counting historical depot huts of polar explorers including Peary's Cape Columbia Depot. From 1963 to 1972 the station was occasionally used during summers (April to August) as a base for smaller groups working in the area around the station. In 1972 a new station, Kap Harald Moltke, was built at Cape Harald Moltke, some ten kilometers east of Brønlundhus, on the opposite side of Jørgen Brønlund Fjord, where an old raised seabed provides a natural runway, making air access possible. In summer, traffic between the two neighboring stations is by boat, depending on ice conditions. Since the death of Eigil Knuth in 1996, the stations have been administered by the Peary Land Foundation.

Today, Brønlundhus can be characterised as a museum, with a collection of artefacts from polar explorations. In 2001, a Nanok team found the station in reasonably good condition, and performed minor repairs and exterior maintenance with paint and felt.

== See also ==
- List of research stations in the Arctic
