= Cape Harald Moltke =

Headland in Peary Land, North Greenland

Cape Harald Moltke Kap Harald Moltke
- Cape
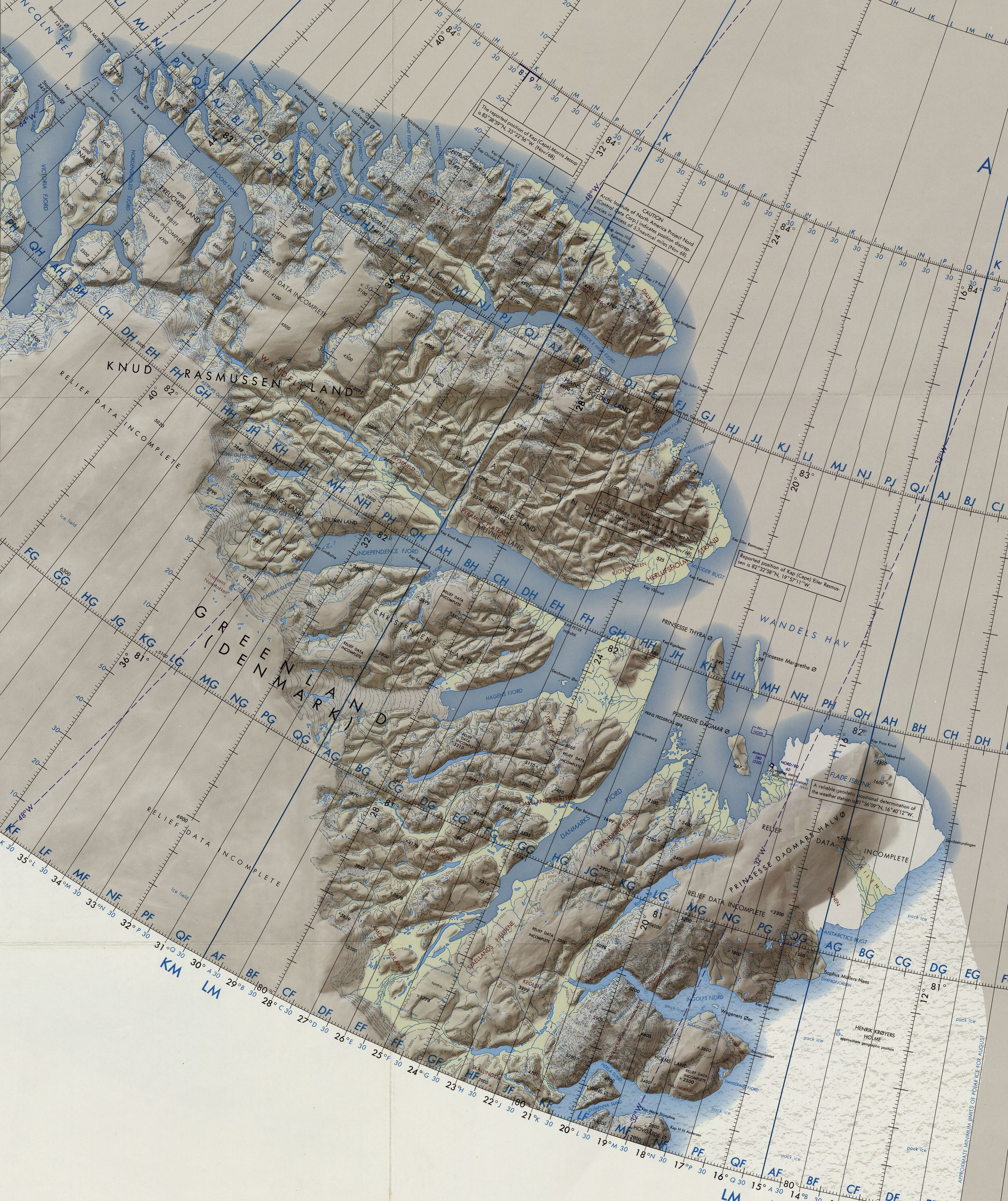
- Map of North Greenland.

- Coordinates: 82°7′N 31°20′W
- Location: Peary Land, Greenland
- Offshore water bodies: Independence Fjord; Wandel Sea

Cape Harald Moltke (Danish: Kap Harald Moltke) is a headland in Peary Land, North Greenland. Administratively it is part of the Northeast Greenland National Park.

== History ==
The cape was named by Lauge Koch after Danish painter, author and explorer Harald Moltke. The Danish scientific research station Kap Harald Moltke was built in 1972 near the cape under the auspices of Eigil Knuth. There is also a small airfield near the facility. The Kap Harald Moltke Arctic station, as well as nearby Brønlundhus Station —built in 1948— have been under the administration of the Peary Land Foundation since Eigil Knuth's death.

== Geography ==
Cape Harald Moltke is located on the northern side of Independence Fjord, at the southwestern end of Melville Land. Jørgen Brønlund Fjord lies to the west of this headland, with its mouth between Cape Harald Moltke on the eastern side and Cape Knud Rasmussen to the west.

== Bibliography ==
- Bjarne Grønnow; Jens Fog Jensen. The Northernmost Ruins of the Globe. Man and Society. Vol. 29. ISBN 87-90369-65-3.
- Eigil Knuth. Kap Harald Moltke, 1973
