= Nordkrone =

Mountain in Greenland

- Nordkronen
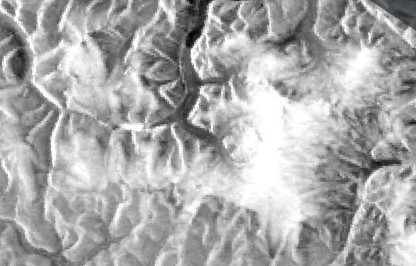
- Nordkrone Sentinel-1 image

Highest point
- Peak: Mount Wistar
- Elevation: 1,737 m (5,699 ft)
- Coordinates: 82°53′15″N 32°30′28″W

Geography
- Location within Greenland
- Location: Peary Land, Greenland
- Range coordinates: 82°45′N 31°0′W

Climbing
- First ascent: Unknown

Map of part of Ellesmere Island and far Northern Greenland.

Nordkrone (Danish: Nordkronen, meaning "Northern Crown") is a mountainous area in Peary Land, Northern Greenland. Administratively it is part of the Northeast Greenland National Park.

Fossils dating back to the Silurian have been found in the area of the range. They belong to the Nordkronen Formation of the Peary Land Group.

== History ==
The mountain was mapped by Danish Arctic explorer Lauge Koch during his Cartographic Air Expedition of 1938. He named it after the "North Crown", which symbolically crowns the world's northernmost country. The most conspicuous peak in the area had been previously named by Robert Peary as Mount Wistar (Wistars Fjeld). In 1950 Eigil Knuth, the leader of the Danish Peary Land Expedition, asserted that the mountain was part of Nordkrone, and described it as "the strangest and proudest peak" of Peary Land:

(Nordkrone)... is the soul of Peary Land. Isolated it lies in the heart of the country expressing all its vast solitude. With its rows of giant pillars, its glaciers snaking in heraldic designs at the foot, it bears witness to the two mighty powers that reign over Peary Land, the wind and the frost.

== Geography ==
Nordkrone is located in central Peary Land, to the south of Frederick E. Hyde Fjord, describing an arc to the east and northwest of the head of the Freja Fjord, around the Balder Glacier flowing from the south. The Børglum River (Børglum Elv) flows southward from Nordkrone to Brønlund Fjord. Nordkrone is variously described as a plateau and as a ridge. The surface of Nordkrone is plateau-like with ridges attaining high elevations and an ice cap out of which flow many glaciers. Its slopes are intersected by deep ravines with steep sides.

With a height of 1,737 metres (5,699 ft), Mt Wistar is the highest elevation of Peary Land to the south of Frederick E. Hyde Fjord. It rises at the northwestern end, west of the Balder Glacier. Other elevations within Nordkrone range from about 1,584 m (5,197 ft) to more than 1,280 m (4,200 ft).

== See also ==
- List of fossiliferous stratigraphic units in Greenland
- List of mountains in Greenland
- List of rivers of Greenland
- Mara Mountain

== Bibliography ==
- Greenland geology and selected mineral occurrences - GEUS
