= Børglum River =

River in Greenland

Børglum River Børglum Elv

- Mouth location in Peary Land, Greenland

Location
- Country: Greenland

Physical characteristics
- Source
  - location: Nordkrone
- Mouth: Brønlund Fjord
  - coordinates: 82°11′N 30°20′W

Basin features
- Progression: Brønlund Fjord→Independence Fjord→Wandel Sea

The Børglum River (Danish: Børglum Elv) is a river in Peary Land, Greenland. It is the largest river in Greenland. Administratively it is part of the Northeast Greenland National Park.

The Børglum River Formation is named after the river. Fossils dating back to the Ordovician have been found in it. The Børglum River Formation was deposited in the paleoequatorial marginal seas of Laurentia during the Katian.

== Course ==
The Børglum River is formed on the southern slopes of the Nordkrone. After leaving the mountains it heads roughly southwards across the desolate territories of the western limit of Melville Land, an unglaciated area. Finally it bends southwestwards and joins the left side of the Brønlund Fjord 10 km (6.2 mi) from its mouth in the Independence Fjord. The river receives many tributaries along its course.

The river was first mapped by Danish Arctic explorer Lauge Koch during his Cartographic Air Expedition of 1938. He named it after the medieval Børglum Abbey in Denmark.

== See also ==
- List of rivers of Greenland
