= Melville Land =

Area in Peary Land, Greenland

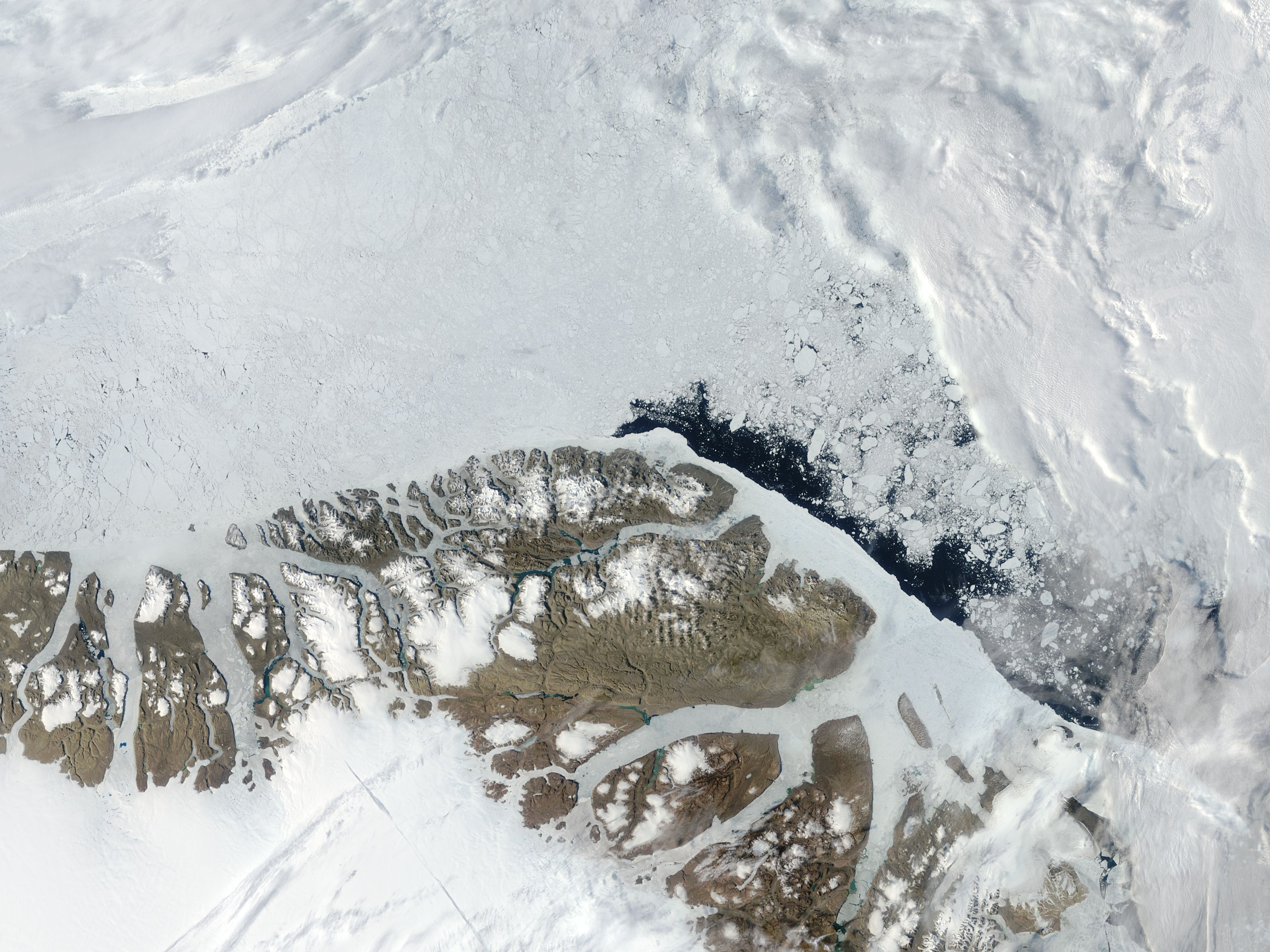
- NASA image of far Northern Greenland.

- Location within Greenland

Geography
- Location: Peary Land, Greenland
- Coordinates: 82°20′N 27°10′W
- Adjacent to: Independence Fjord; Brønlund Fjord
- Length: 80 km (50 mi)
- Width: 40 km (25 mi)
- Highest elevation: 1,157 m (3796 ft)
- Highest point: Unnamed

Administration
- Greenland (Denmark)

Demographics
- Population: Uninhabited

Melville Land is an area in Peary Land, North Greenland. Administratively it is part of the Northeast Greenland National Park.

== History ==
Robert Peary named the territory, together with Heilprin Land, in 1892 during his North Greenland Expedition sponsored by the Academy of Natural Sciences in Philadelphia. He named it after Chief Engineer George W. Melville (1841–1912), chief of the Bureau of Steam Engineering of the United States Navy. Peary sighted the coast of Melville Land shore from afar to the northeast. He drew a rough map based on the panorama that he saw from Navy Cliff, at the head of Independence Fjord, but did not explore the area.

In 1912 Knud Rasmussen, during his First Thule Expedition, compared favorably Melville Land with the barren and desolate land that he had crossed south of Independence Fjord. He marveled at the abundance of game, including muskoxen, hares and ptarmigan. Birdlife was plentiful, and many seals lay out on the ice of the fjord, basking in the sun. He mentioned that

It was a real delight to see not clay, nor rocks, nor gravel, but earth; mould, dotted everywhere with red-blossoming saxifrage.

The territory was finally mapped with accuracy by Lauge Koch from a height of 2,438 metres (7,999 ft) during his cartographic air expedition of 1938. Koch noted in his exploration that the land was ice-free.

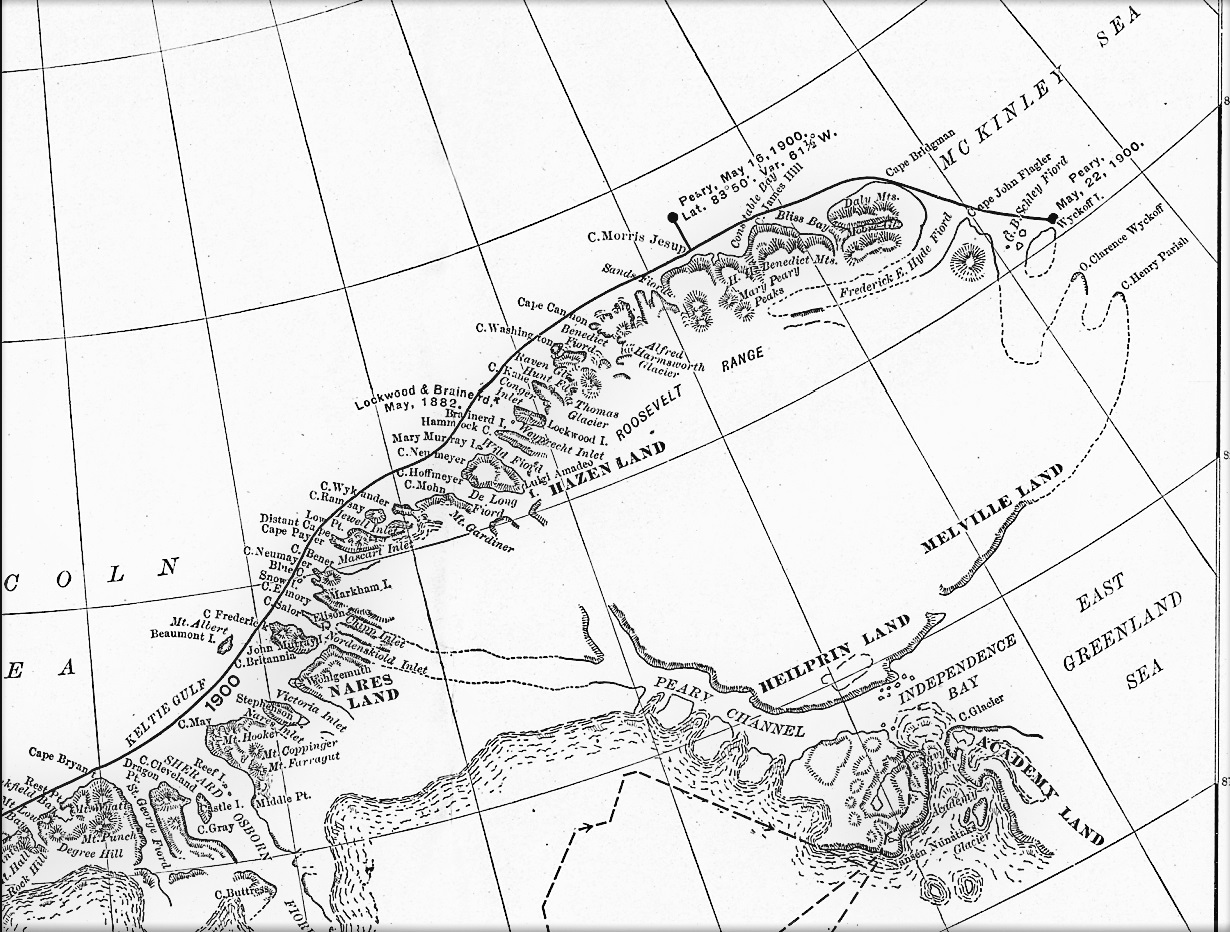
Section of Robert Peary's map "Polar Regions" published in 1903.

== Geography ==
Melville Land is located in southern Peary Land, on the northern side of the middle section of the Independence Fjord. To the west it is limited by the Bronlund Fjord, and to the east by Kjovesletten, a small coastal area beyond which lies Herlufsholm Strand. Cape Harald Moltke marks the southwestern end and Cape Caroline Marie the southeastern. The Børglum River flows from the Nordkrone southwards at the western end.

Remarkably for the high latitude the terrain is unglaciated. The part along the shore of Independence Fjord has high sandstone cliffs with elevations averaging 460 metres (1,509 ft), including the Pyramide Plateau in the western sector. The banks near the shore are dissected by small river valleys and ravines. The inner part to the north is mountainous and not clearly delimited, with the highest point reaching 1,157 metres (3,796 ft).

== Bibliography ==
- H.P. Trettin (ed.), Geology of the Innuitian Orogen and Arctic Platform of Canada and Greenland. 1991
- B. Fristrup, Winderosion within the Arctic Deserts. 1953

== See also ==
- Cartographic expeditions to Greenland
- Innuitian orogeny
