= Else Moltke =

Danish countess and feminist (1888–1986)

Fair use image by Jørgensen, John (f. 1919)

Else Moltke (1888–1986) was a Danish countess, writer and women's rights activist. A keen contributor to newspapers and magazines from the early 1930s, she wrote mainly about historical figures, a topic which was behind Fra Bondehus til Herregaard (From Farmhouse to Manor, 1941).

As a feminist, she recognized the difficulties women faced in achieving success. In 1941, she founded and ran a women's discussion club (Kvindelige Diskussionsklub) in Copenhagen which over the years achieved a membership of some 800.

From the mid-1960s, Moltke published 14 books, the most successful of which was Fra herregård til kunstnerhus (From Manor to Artists' House, 1965).

== Early life, education and family ==
Born on the Konradineslyst Estate in the parish of Ruds Vedby near Sorø on 2 March 1888, Else Moltke was the daughter of the landowner Otto Joachim Adam Moltke (1860–1937) and his wife Ingeborg née Valentiner (1862–1947). She was one of the family's six children. In March 1910, she married her distant cousin, the painter Harald Viggo Moltke (1871–1960), with whom she had two daughters: Rose (1913) and Alette (1926).

Brought up in a family with traditional conservative values, Else's father did not support her wish to continue her studies like her brothers. Nevertheless, when she was 17 she attended a housekeeping school where she took language and piano lessons. Two years later aged 17, while attending Johan Borups Højskole in Copenhagen, she met and fell in love with a distant relative, the painter and explorer Harald Moltke. Despite her parents' objections to her interest in a poor artist, she went ahead and married him.

== Professional activities ==
During the following years, while bringing up a family, Moltke became acquainted with her husband's artist friends which led to her involvement in the restoration of Bakkehuset, the former residence of the writer Knud Lyne Rahbek and his wife Kamma, who is remembered for her salons which attracted many Danish Golden Age writers. The building was opened as a cultural museum in 1925 and Moltke later served on the board of the Bakkehuset Danish Literature Society (Bakkehuset Dansk Litteraturselskab) from 1932 to 1959.

From 1931, Moltke contributed to newspapers and magazines, writing enthusiastically about the lives of historic figures and the manor houses in which they lived. In 1939, influenced by the German occupation of Poland, she published Polsk September (Polish September), documenting her travels through the country's towns and villages. Other books include Fra Bondehus til Herregaard (1941), Fra herregård til kunstnerhus (1965), Min svanevinge (My Swan Wings, 1984) and Krisetid og stjernestunder (Times of Crisis and Moments of Stardom, 1985).

Moltke recognized the difficulties women faced in achieving success. In 1941, she founded and chaired a popular women's discussion club (Kvindelige Diskussionsklub) in Copenhagen which over the years achieved a membership of some 800. A key participant was the novelist Thit Jensen with whom Moltke established a fruitful relationship. Kvinde før og nu (Woman Then and Now, 1974), Moltke records the club's activities and history. She also became a member of the Danish Women's Society and of the Danish branch of Open Doors International.

Else Moltke died in Copenhagen on 10 January 1986 and was buried in Reerslev Cemetery at Ruds Vedby.
