= Ludvig Mylius-Erichsen =

Danish author, ethnologist, and explorer

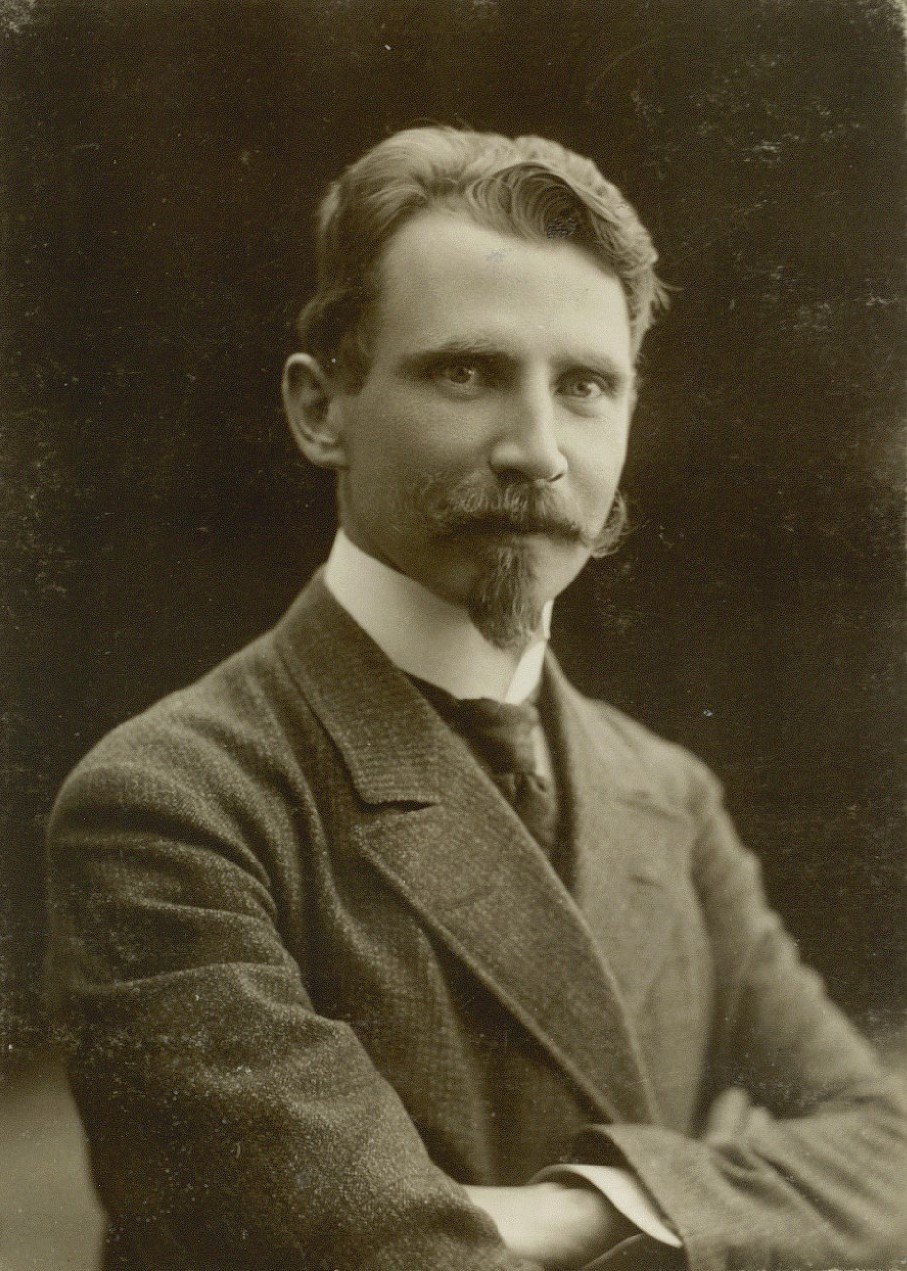
- Mylius-Erichsen, c. early 20th century
- Born: 15 January 1872; Ringkøbing, Denmark
- Died: 25 November 1907 (aged 35); Northeast Greenland
- Citizenship: Danish
- Occupations: Author, ethnologist, explorer
- Known for: Literary Expedition to Greenland; commander of the Denmark Expedition
- Notable work: Isblink, Grønland

Ludvig Mylius-Erichsen (15 January 1872 – 25 November 1907) was a Danish author, ethnologist, and Arctic explorer. He played a central role in early 20th-century exploration of Greenland, leading the Denmark Expedition (1906–08), which mapped large areas of northeast Greenland and corrected earlier geographic misconceptions. He died during the expedition.

== Early life, family and education ==
Ludvig Mylius-Erichsen was born in Ringkøbing, Denmark. Son of Peter Henrik Erichsen (1842-1911) and Karoline Marie Antonisen (1843-1900) Had sister Josephine Frederikke (1870-??) Wife Marie Berthine Sophie Lesse (1868-1942) Married 1898 <https://www.familysearch.org>

== Literary expedition ==
With Count Harald Moltke and Knud Rasmussen Mylius-Erichsen formed the Danish Literary Expedition (1902–04) to West Greenland, and, in the early stages (1902), discovered, near Evighedsfjord, two ice-free mountain ranges. The party later proceeded to Cape York and lived for 10 months in native fashion with the Eskimo. The return journey of the expedition to Upernavik across the ice of Melville Bay was the first sledge crossing on record.

== Denmark expedition ==
As commander of the Denmark Expedition (1906–08) Mylius-Erichsen undertook and carried out the task of exploring and charting the entire coastline of unknown northeast Greenland by three months' field work. The expedition made sledge journeys of more than 4000 miles (6,436 km), exceeding the record of any single Arctic force. The main travel, excluding duplications, of Johan Peter Koch was some 1250 miles (2011 km), and that of Mylius-Erichsen must have exceeded 1000 miles (1609 km). Their explorations showed that Robert Peary's chart of a coast trending southeast from Navy Cliff was radically incorrect. Instead the shore ran to the northeast, adding about 100,000 square miles (259,000 km^{2}) to Greenland and extending it about halfway from Navy Cliff—where the maps wrongly placed Greenland Sea—to Spitzbergen. Mylius-Erichsen's own exploration proved that Peary Channel did not exist. Two years later Ejnar Mikkelsen (1880–1971), leader of a new Danish Greenland expedition, assumed the channel existed until he found Mylius-Erichsen's report in a cairn at the head of Danmark Fjord, where Mylius-Erichsen had written emphatically that:

... the Peary Channel does not exist.

Mylius-Erichsen established the continuity of Greenland from Cape Farewell, 60° N, to the most northern land ever reached, 83° 39' N. He also discovered and explored the great fiords of Danmark, Hagen, and Brønlund.

=== Death ===
Misled by existing maps, Mylius-Erichsen with Niels Peter Høeg Hagen and the Greenlander Jørgen Brønlund so prolonged his journey that a return to the ship that spring was impossible, and they were forced to spend the summer in the area of the Denmark Fjord without the necessary footgear for hunting in the stony area. The need for food for men and dogs forced them to reduce their three dogteams to one. Finally, in September, they were able to start their return journey on the new frozen sea ice, around the northeastern corner of Greenland. However, when they arrived at the southern shore of Mallemuk Mountain, they found open water and were forced to travel inland. En route, Mylius-Erichsen and Hagen perished of starvation, exhaustion, and cold walking on the ice of Nioghalvfjerdsfjorden. Hagen's map sketches and the body of Brønlund together with his diary were found next spring by Koch in Lambert Land. Some cairn reports, left at Danmark Fjord by Mylius-Erichsen, were found and brought to Copenhagen by Ejnar Mikkelsen in 1912.

== Works ==
- Tatere (1898), a drama
- Vestjyder (1900), tales
- Den Jydske Hede før og nu (1903)
- Isblink (1904), poems from Greenland
- Grønland (1906)
- Report on the nonexistence of Peary Channel in Meddelelser om Grønland, (50 volumes, Copenhagen, 1876–1912), volume xli (1913), edited by Ejnar Mikkelsen.

== Honours ==
- Mylius-Erichsen Land in northern Greenland was named after him.
- Denmark Expedition Memorial in Copenhagen.
- A silver commemorative medal issued in 1933 –25 years after the expedition— by Alf Trolle (1879–1949), captain of expedition ship Danmark and leader of the Denmark expedition after Mylius-Erichsen's death.

== Literature ==
- Achton Friis, Danmark Expeditionen til Grönlands Nordostkyst (1909), reprinted in 1987 and 2005.
- Greely, True Tales of Arctic Heroism (New York, 1912)
- Rasmussen, People of the Polar North (Philadelphia, 1908)
- G. C. Amdrup, Report on the Denmark Expedition to the North-East Coast of Greenland (Copenhagen, 1913).
- Ole Ventegodt, "Den sidste Brik", Copenhagen, 1997
- Peter Freuchen, "Min grønlandske ungdom", 1936 (Memories)

== See also ==
- Cartographic expeditions to Greenland
