= Denmark Expedition Memorial =

Monument in Denmark

Coordinates: 55°41′41″N 12°36′01″E

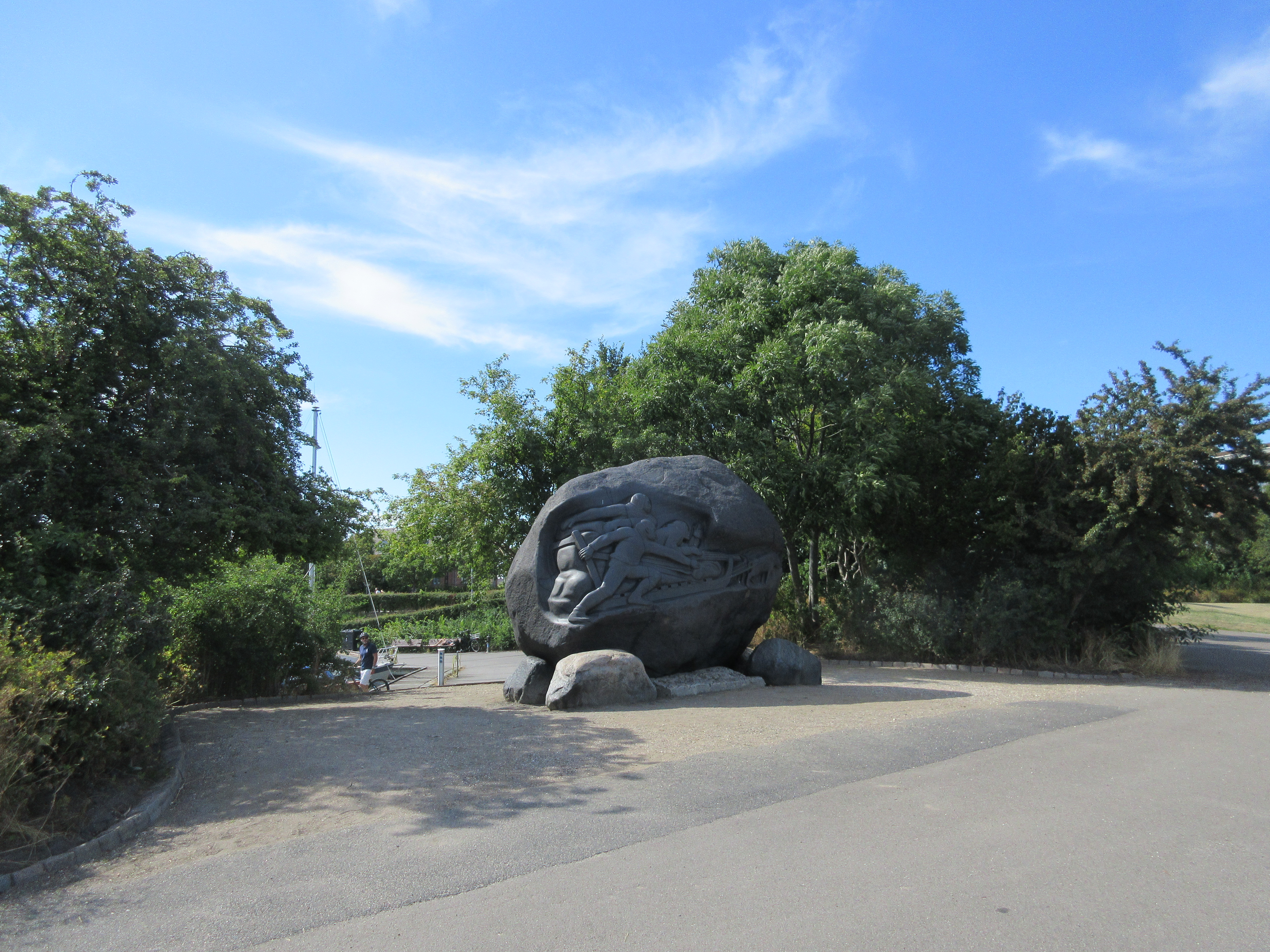
The Denmark Expedition Memorial

The Denmark Expedition Memorial is a sculpted boulder at Langelinie in Copenhagen, Denmark, commemorating Ludvig Mylius-Erichsen (1872–1907), Niels Peter Høeg Hagen (1877–1907) and Jørgen Brønlund (1877–1907) who died on the Denmark Expedition to North-East Greenland in 1907. The memorial was unveiled in 1912. It was designed by Kai Nielsen in collaboration with Kaare Klint.

== Description ==
The memorial consists of a granite boulder which measures 340 x 390 x 190 cm. Its surface was smoothened but its natural shape retained. The front side features a relief featuring three men pushing a dog sled.

== History ==
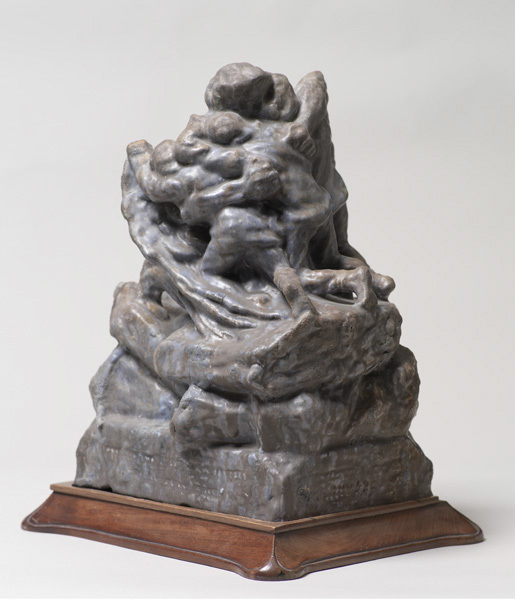
Model of Niels Hansen Jacobsen's proposal, now in the Danish National Gallery

The monument was the result of a competition launched by a committee in February 1911. The competition was won by Kai Nielsen. Other entries in the competition were submitted by Carl Bonnesen, Elna Borch, Niels Hansen Jacobsen, and Holger Wederkinck.

The granite boulder was retrieved from Flinterenden in the Øresund. The relief was carved at the site and the finished memorial was unveiled in 1911.

A carved inscription on the rear side of the boulder consists mainly of a quote from Brønlund's diary.

== Gallery ==
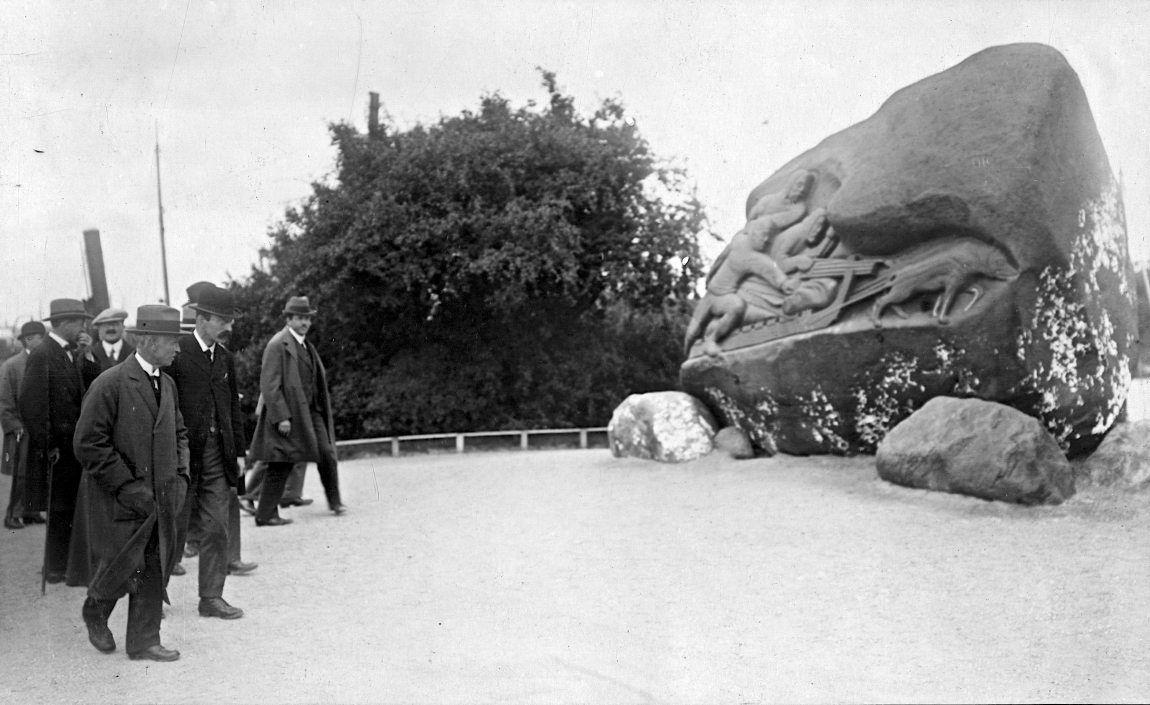
The Denmark Expedition Memorial in 1919

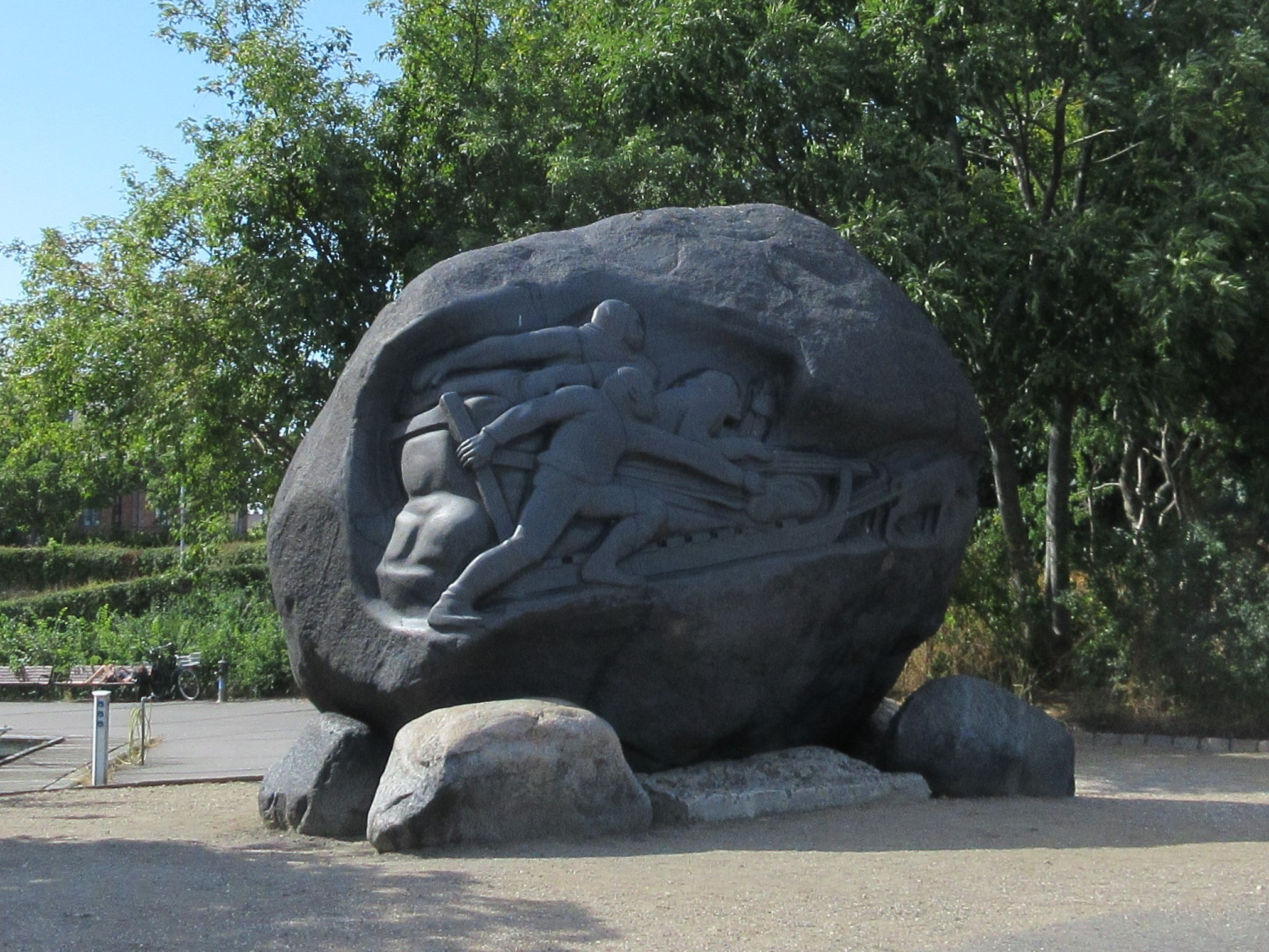
Front side

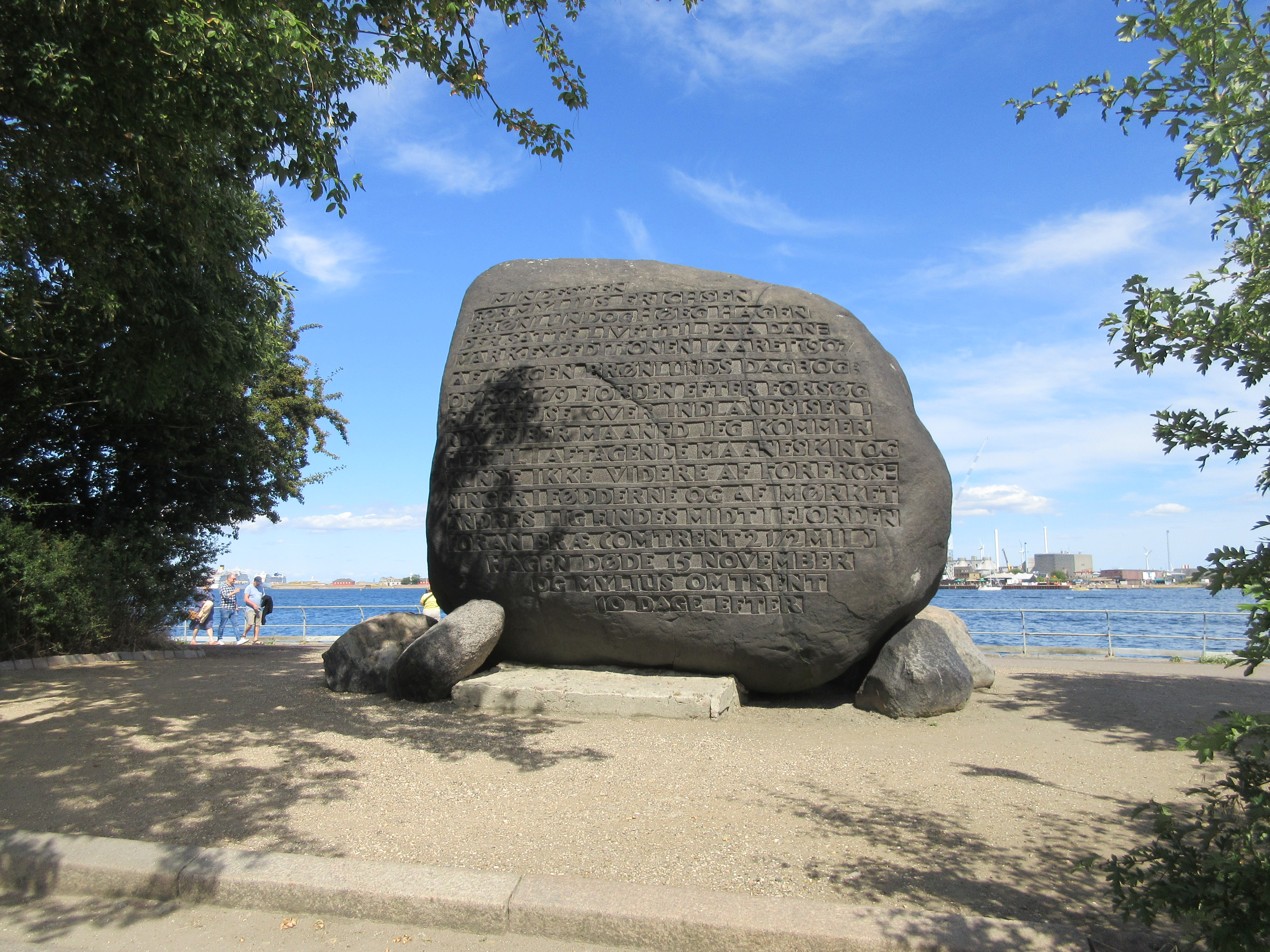
Inscription on the rear side.
