= Mylius-Erichsen Land =

Peninsula in Greenland

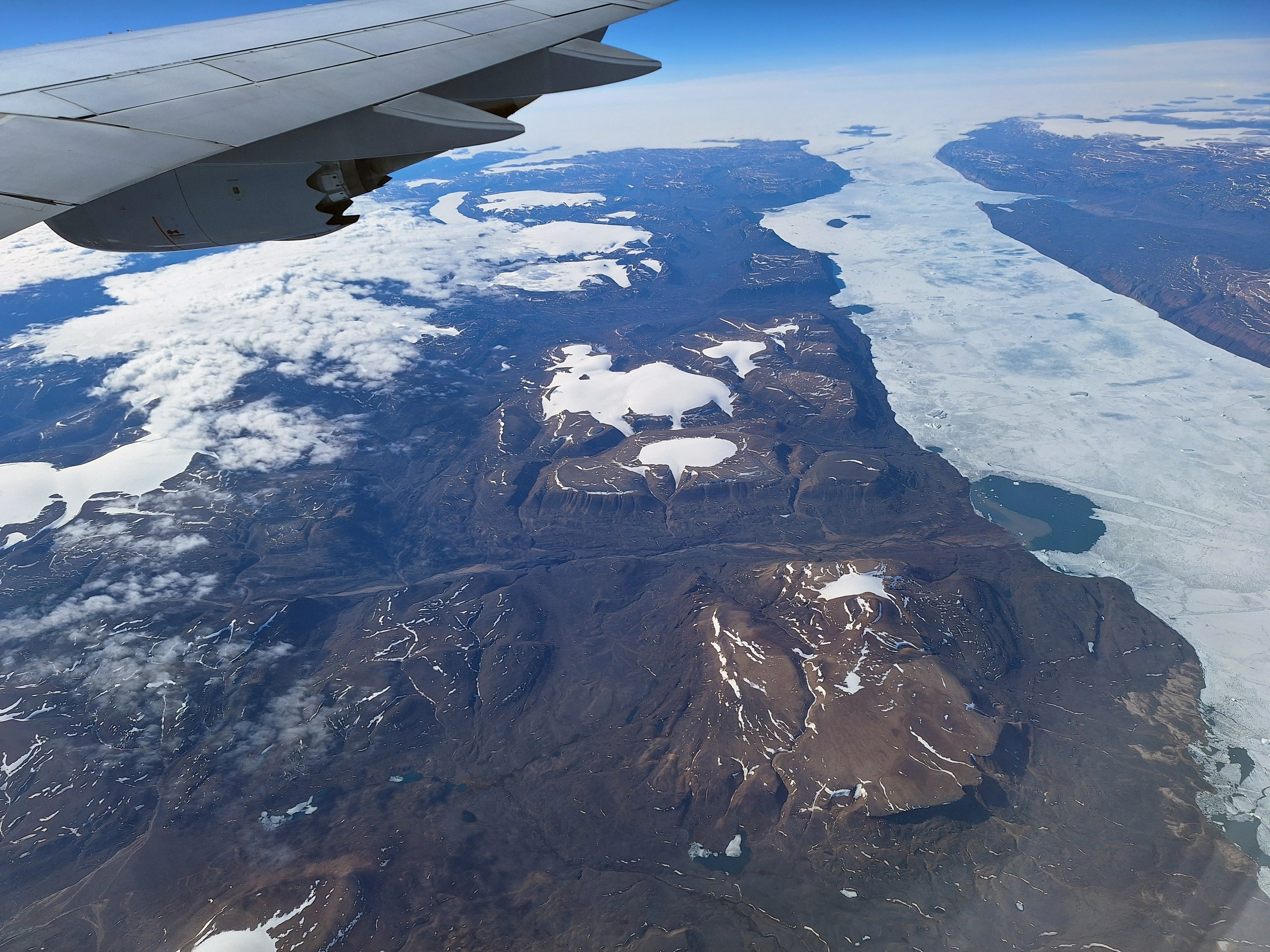
- Aerial photo in July 2026, looking southwest. Hagen Fjord is visible on the right.

- Location within Greenland

Geography
- Location: Northeast Greenland
- Coordinates: 81°18′N 24°13′W
- Adjacent to: Hagen Fjord; Independence Fjord; Danmark Fjord
- Length: 160 km (99 mi)
- Width: 110 km (68 mi)

Administration
- Greenland (Denmark)
- Zone: NE Greenland National Park

Demographics
- Population: Uninhabited

Mylius-Erichsen Land is a peninsula in King Frederick VIII Land, northeastern Greenland. Administratively it belongs to the NE Greenland National Park area.

== Geography ==
Mylius-Erichsen Land is bounded in the north by the Independence Fjord, in the west by the Hagen Fjord and the Hagen Glacier, in the east by the Danmark Fjord and in the south by the Greenland Ice Sheet. There is no large calving glacier at the head of the Danmark Fjord, but all surrounding fjords are icebound the whole year round.

The northernmost headland is Cape Rigsdagen and the northern section of the peninsula appears in some maps as "Valdemar Glückstadt Land."

== History ==
Mylius-Erichsen Land was named by the 1906-1908 Denmark expedition after its ill-fated leader Ludvig Mylius-Erichsen.

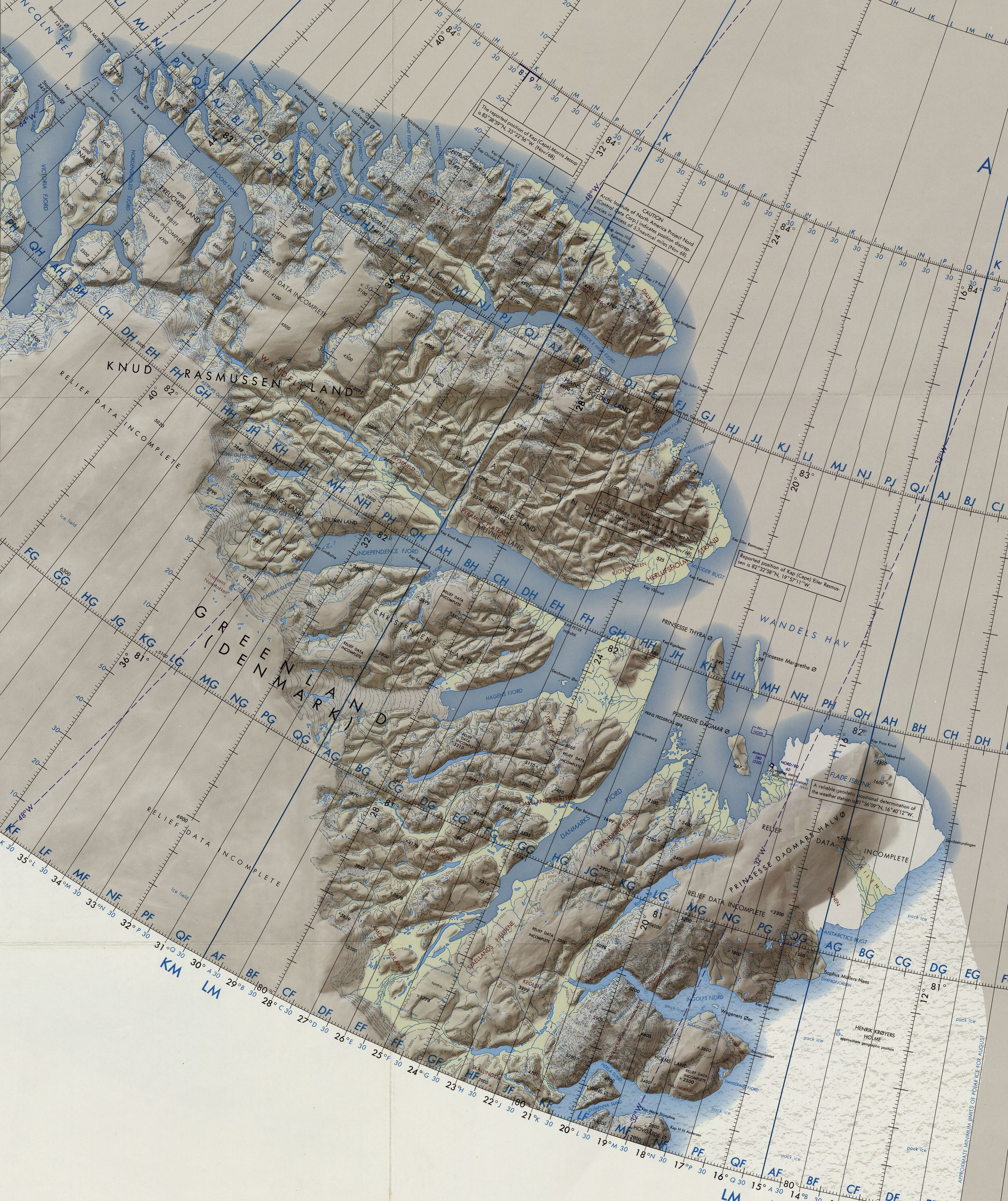
Map of Northern Greenland.

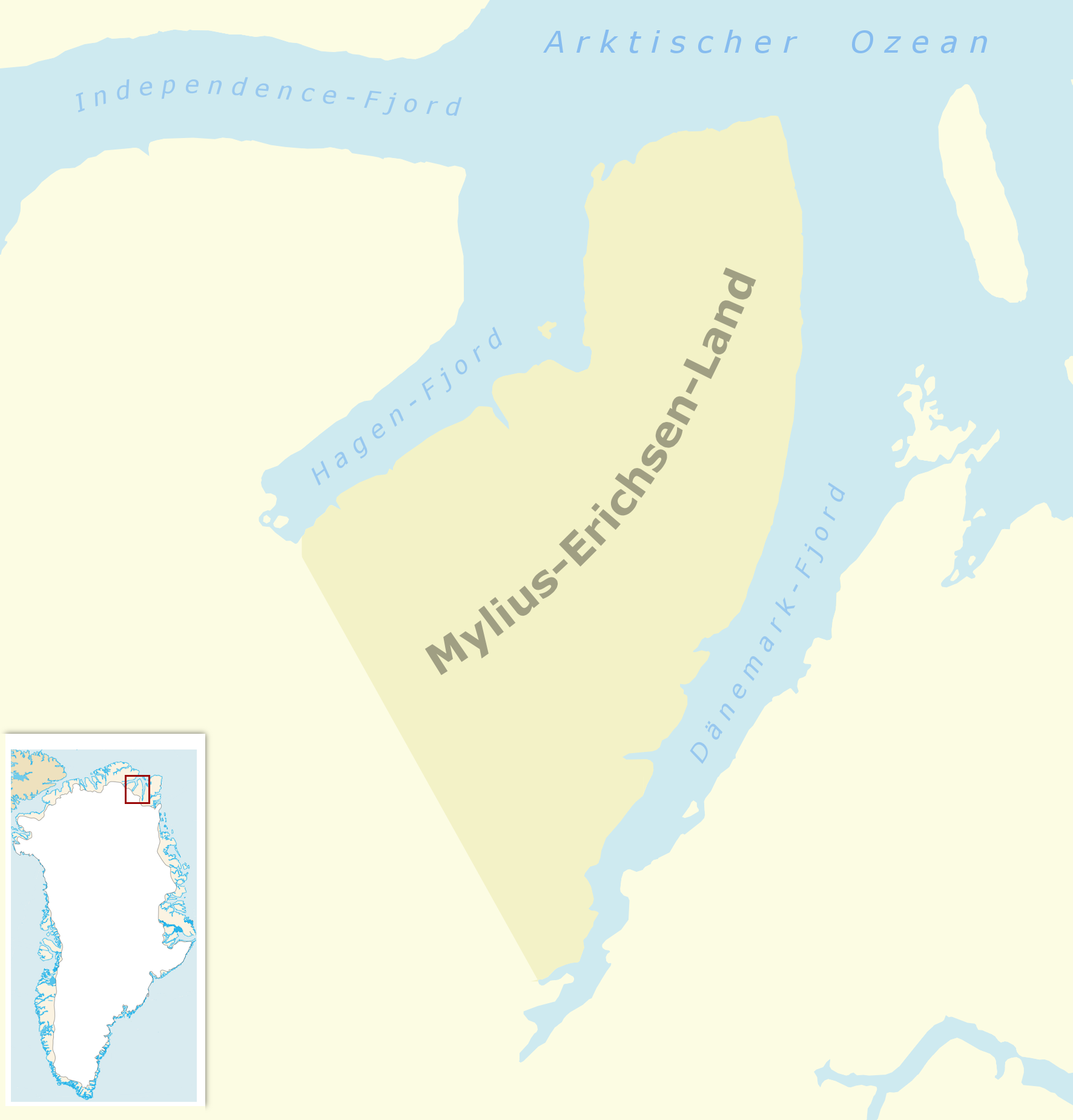
Location map.
