= Niels Peter Høeg Hagen =

Danish military officer, polar explorer and cartographer

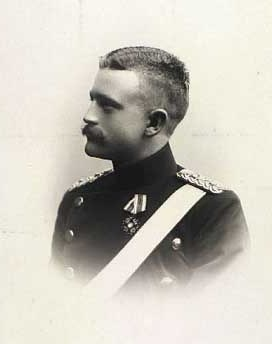
Niels Peter Høeg Hagen

Niels Peter Høeg Hagen (15 October 1877 – 15 November 1907) was a Danish military officer, polar explorer and cartographer. He participated and perished in the ill-fated Denmark expedition to NE Greenland in 1906.

== The Denmark expedition ==
Høeg Hagen, together with expedition leader Ludvig Mylius-Erichsen and the Greenlander Jørgen Brønlund, was part of the team of dogsleds that aimed to explore the Independence Fjord area from the east. Misled by existing maps, the three men prolonged their journey to such an extent that a return to the ship at Danmarkshavn that spring was impossible.

The three of them were forced to spend the summer in the desolate area without the necessary footgear for hunting in the stony ground. The need for food for men and dogs forced them to reduce their three dogteams to one. Finally in September they were able to start their return journey on the new frozen sea ice along the coast, but when they arrived at the southern shore of Mallemuk Mountain, they found open water and were forced to travel inland. Hagen perished of starvation, exhaustion, and cold while walking on the ice in the Nioghalvfjerdsbrae area, followed by Mylius-Erichsen a few days later.

The last to die was Brønlund; his body, together with his diary and Hagen's cartographic sketches were found next spring by Johan Peter Koch in Lambert Land. Some cairn reports, left at Danmark Fjord by Mylius-Erichsen, were found and brought to Copenhagen by Ejnar Mikkelsen in 1912.

Hagen Fjord, a southern branch of Independence Fjord, as well as Hagen Glacier, were named in his honour.

== See also ==
- Denmark Expedition Memorial
