= Brønlund Fjord Group =

Geologic formation in Greenland

- Stratigraphic range: Cambrian
- Type: Group

Location
- Country: Greenland

Type section
- Named for: Brønlund Fjord

The Brønlund Fjord Group is a geologic group in Greenland. It preserves fossils dated to the Cambrian period.

== See also ==
- List of fossiliferous stratigraphic units in Greenland
