= Harald Moltke =

Danish painter, author and explorer

Harald Viggo Moltke
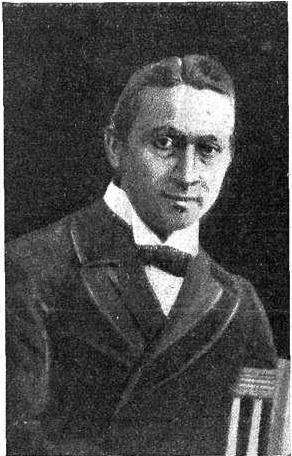
- Born: June 14, 1871; Helsingør, Denmark
- Died: June 24, 1960 (aged 89); Frederiksberg, Denmark
- Education: Royal Danish Academy of Fine Arts

Harald Viggo Moltke (14 December 1871 – 24 June 1960) was a Danish painter, author and explorer. As an explorer he acted as draftsman in four Arctic expeditions.

== Early life and education ==
Harald Moltke was born in Helsingør, the son of Oskar Peter August Moltke (1828–82) and Karen Marie Jensdatter (1849–1939). He spent 10 years in North Carolina as a child between 1874 and 1884. After the death of his father, the family returned to Denmark. In 1889, he began a course of study at the Royal Danish Academy of Fine Arts in Copenhagen, which he completed in 1893.

== Career ==
From May to November 1898, he participated in a geological expedition headed by K. J. V. Steenstrup (1842-1906) to the Disko Bay region at the west coast of Greenland. From this expedition Moltke made paintings of geological structures, a.o., the coast line of Nugsuark Peninsula, and of the Inuit, a.o., "Greenland women in umiak".

During July 1899 to April 1900, Moltke joined an aurora expedition to Akureyri in Iceland. The expedition was arranged and headed by the director, Adam F. W. Paulsen (1833-1907), of the Danish Meteorological Institute (DMI). Further participants were Dan Barfod la Cour (1876-1942), director of DMI 1923–1942, and Ivar B. Jantzen (1875–1961). In Akureyri, Moltke made 19 paintings of auroras and 5 portrait sketches of the expedition members.

In the winter 1900–1901, Moltke participated in another DMI aurora expedition; this time to Utsjoki in northern Finland. This expedition was headed by Dan B. la Cour. Further participants were Carl Edvard Thune Middelboe (1875-1924) and Johannes K. Kofoed (1877–1939). Here, Moltke made, a.o., 6 paintings of auroras. The aurora paintings from the two aurora expedition belong to and reside now with the Danish Meteorological Institute.

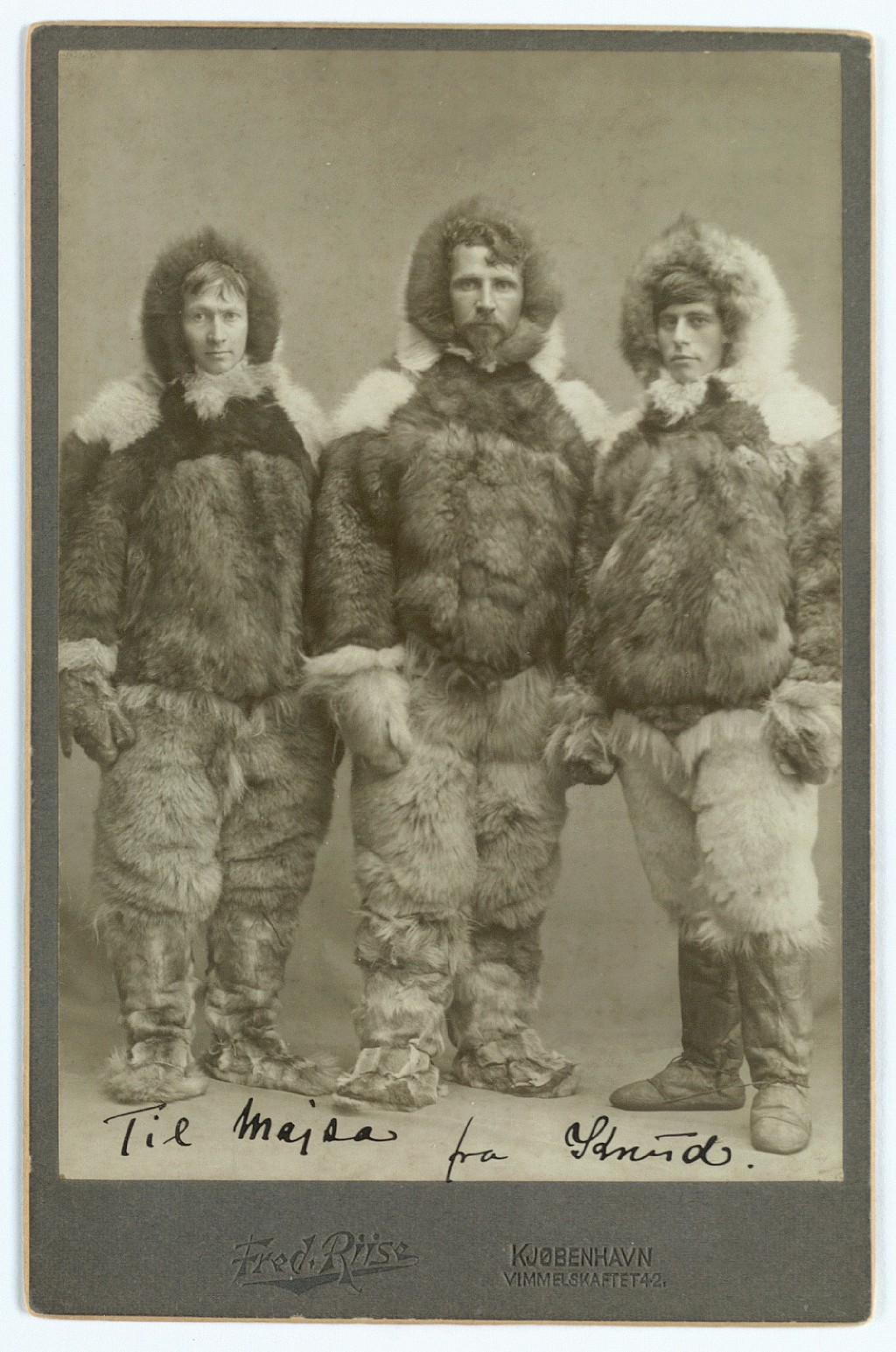
Harald Moltke, Ludvig Mylinus-Erichsen, and Knud Rasmussen during the 1902–1904 expedition, photographed by Frederik Riise.

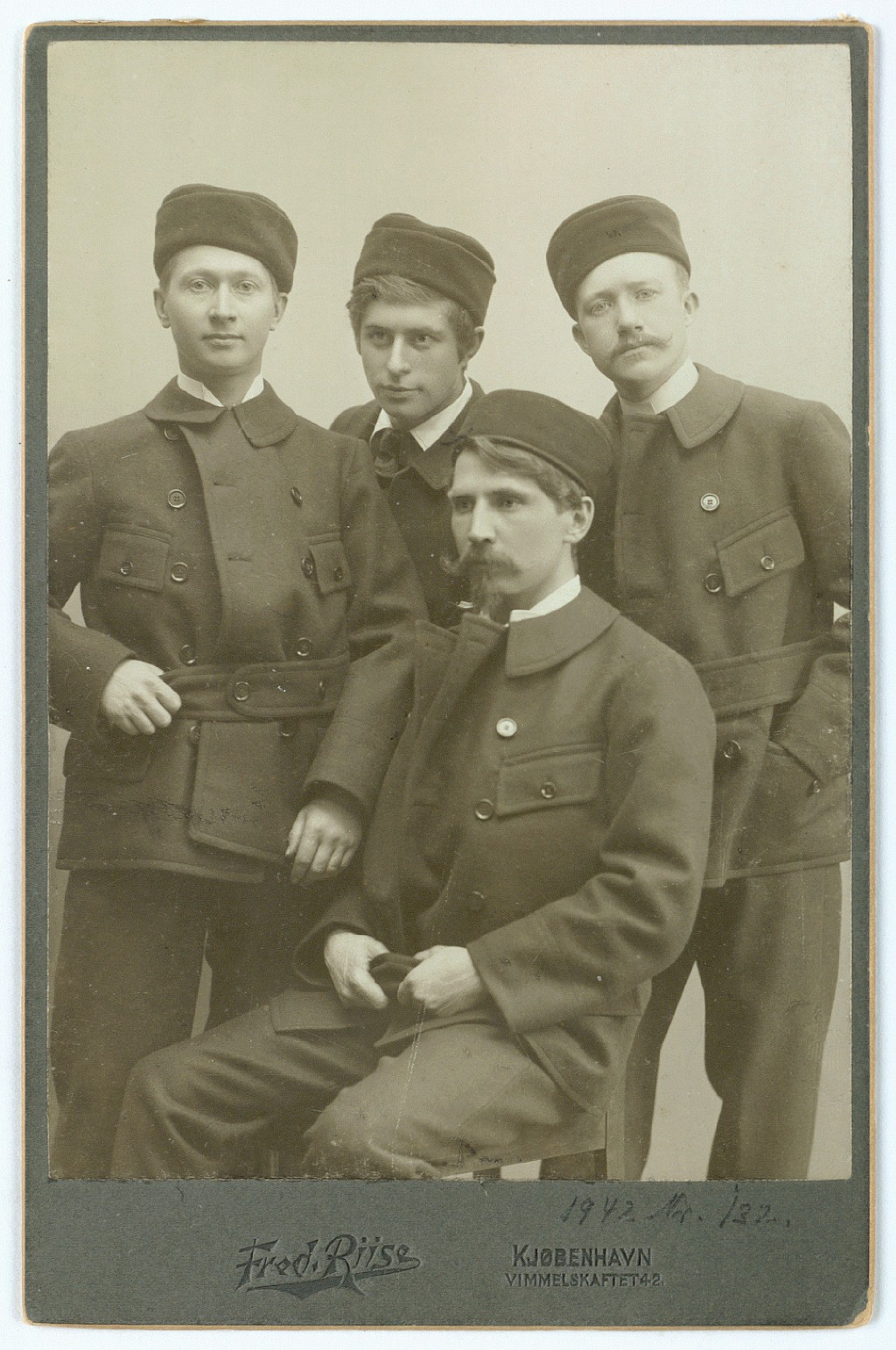
Four participants from the 1902–1904 Literary Greenland Expedition (Harald Moltke, Ludvig Mylius-Erichsen, Knud Rasmussen, and Alfred Bertelsen), photographed by Frederik Riise. Moltke is on the far left.

During 1902–1904, Harald Moltke joined The Literature Expedition (Den Litterære Ekspedition), headed by Ludvig Mylius-Erichsen (1872–1907), with Knud Rasmussen (1879–1933), Jørgen Brønlund (1877–1907) and Alfred Bertelsen (1877–1950). The expedition was a dog sled journey along the unmapped north-west coast of Greenland from Upernavik to Cape York close to Thule. From this expedition his main works are a set of 30 portraits of Inuit, issued in 1903. He also illustrated the book Grønland, illustreret Skildring af Den Danske litterære Grønlandsekspedition 1902-1904 (1906) with Ludvig Mylius-Erichsen as author.

From 1907 to 1908, he was employed at the Royal Copenhagen porcelain factory and from 1908 to 1914 for the porcelain factory Bing & Grondahl.

During the later years of his life, Moltke made numerous paintings, particularly portraits and landscapes, and published his memoirs in two volumes: Livsrejsen (1936) and Den lykkelige Rejse (1941).

== Personal life ==
He married Else Moltke (1888-1986) on 30 March 1910. She was a daughter of Otto Joachim Adam Moltke (1860–1937) and Ingeborg Agnes Valentiner (1862–1947). Else Moltke was the author of several books, mostly historical causeries and memorial sketches. They were the parents of Rose (1913) and Alette (1926). Harald Moltke died during 1960 in Frederiksberg. He and his wife were buried at Reerslev Cemetery.

== Awards and legacy ==
Moltke was created a Knight in the Order of the Dannebrog in 1921 and he was awarded the Cross of Honour in 1941.

His works are on display at the National Museum of Denmark in Copenhagen and at museums in Hillerød and Helsingør. Cape Harald Moltke in North Greenland and Harald Moltke Glacier were named after him.
