= Nordkronen Formation =

Geologic formation in Greenland

- Stratigraphic range: Silurian
- Type: Formation

Location
- Country: Greenland

Type section
- Named for: Nordkrone

The Nordkronen Formation is a formation of the Peary Land Group in Greenland. It preserves fossils dating back to the Silurian period.

The formation was erected by Hurst & Surlyk in 1982 and comprises a sequence of chert pebble conglomerates, pebbly sandstones and sandstones. The main distribution is in Herluf Trolle Land and the hill tops of Nordkronen and Tordenskjold Fjeld in Peary Land. Two members of the formation, the Hendrik Ø and Castle Ø Members, have been traced almost continuously between Freuchen Land and northern Nyeboe Land.

== See also ==
- List of fossiliferous stratigraphic units in Greenland
