= Johan Borups Højskole =

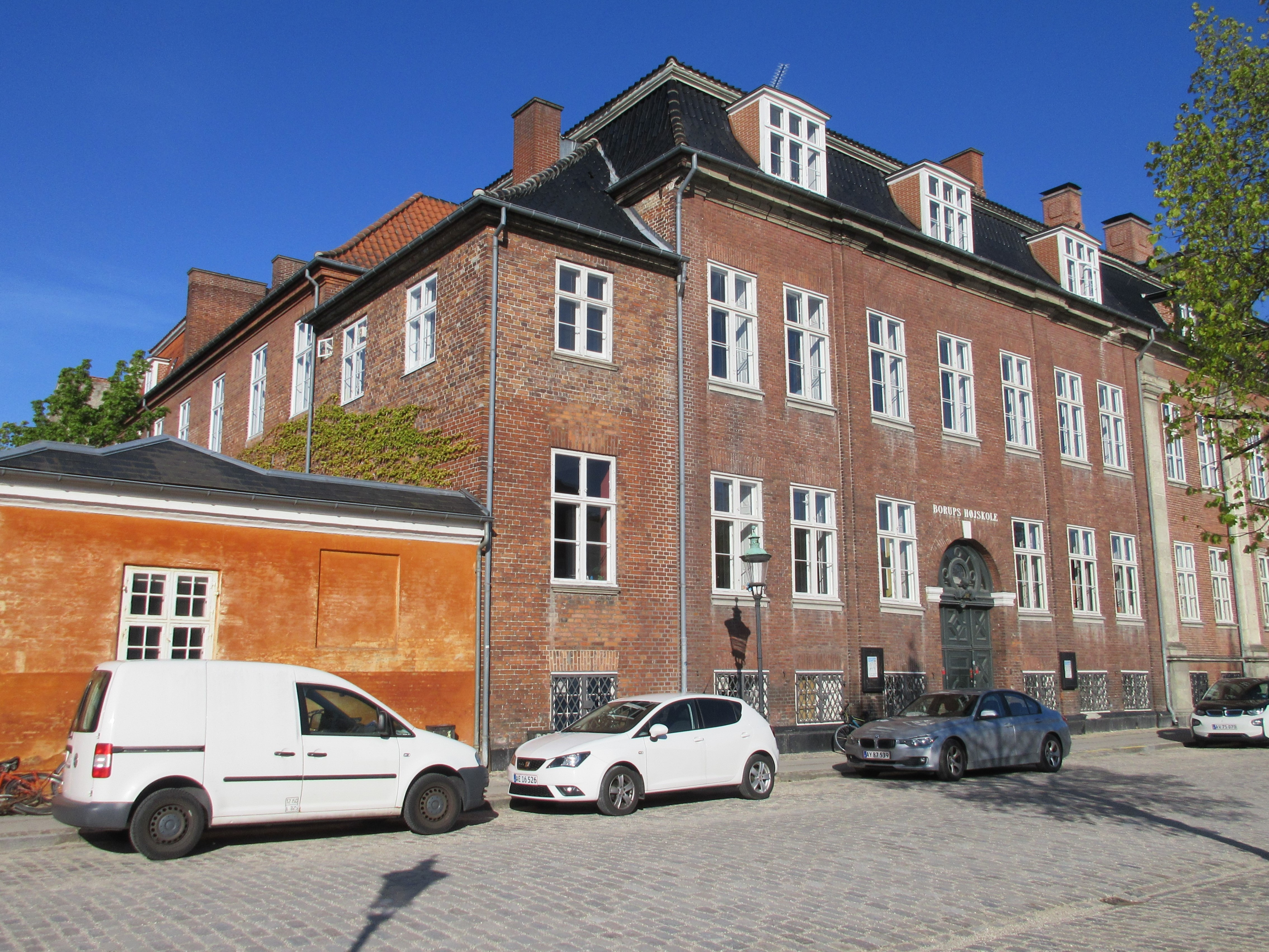

Location
- Copenhagen; Denmark
- Coordinates: 55.673798°N 12.577517°E

Information
- Type: Folk high school
- Founded: 1891
- Director: ?
- Website: Official website

Johan Borups Højskole (literally Borup's Folk High School) is a folk high school situated at Frederiksholms Kanal 24 in central Copenhagen, Denmark.

== History ==
=== The building, 1848–1892 ===
The building was constructed in 1747 as an extension of Jacob Barchmann's adkacent corner mansion.

on 11 March 1779, Barchmann's former mansion were sold to John & William Brown. The firm went bankrupt in 1787. On 21 February 1788, Brown's properties were therefore sold at public auction. The original mansion and the 1747 extension were sold to different buyers. The 1747 extension was sold to warehouse manager Ole Christensen (deed: 22 December 1788). On 2 April 1788, Christensen had a fire insruance assessment carried out. where the building valued at 15,000 Danish rigsdaler. Ole Christensen established himself as a so-called #Icelandic merchant", that is a Copenhagen'-based merchant active in the Iceland trade. He assumed the last name Olsen after his father. He was survived by two daughters. On 26 July 1830, they sold the property to agent Eggert Ghristian Busch for 15,946rigsdaler. on 28 May 1832, Bucxh's property was valued at 33,000 rigsdaler. On 29 August 1842, the property was assigned to the Credit Bank for Homeowners for 14,500 rigsdaler, which presumably was the loan (prioritetsgælden).On 6 December 1847, the property was sold to the affluant businessman Theodor Suhr for 31,000 rigsdaler. He lived in the SUhr House on Gammeltorv. The house on Frederiksholms Kanal was let out to the medical doctor P. G. Bang, who acted as his legal consultant. Suhr left most of his estate to the Suhr Foundation (deed: 2 February 1860). On 7 January 1861, the foundation sold the property ri dustukker Anton Brøndum. Brøndum lived in the building until his death in 1873. On 1 July 1874, Brøndum's widow sold the property to B&W co-founder Carl Christian Burmeister.

On 4 January 1894, Burmeister sold the property to count Mogens Friis. He had already bought the corner mansion.

=== Borup's golk high school ===
The school was founded by Johan Borup in 1891. His maternal uncle, Ernst Trier, was the founder of Vallekilde Højskole on the Odsherred peninsula. The school obtained supplementary government funding from 1894. It moved to larger premises in the Ny Rosenborg building at Harmers Plads in 1895. In 1916 the school's premises had once again become too small. Jens Mortensen, a farmer from kvandløse, started a national collection to raise money for a new building for the school. In 1927, it was able to purchase the mansion at Frederiksholms Kanal.

== Architecture ==
The building is a seven-bay extension from 1748 of the slightly older mansion. The facade is decorated with pilasters, but in red brick instead of sandstone, and the cornice is omitted.

The school also has an assembly hall designed by Henning Hansen. It features a frieze by Einar Utzon-Frank.
