= Hagen Fjord =

Fjord in northeastern Greenland

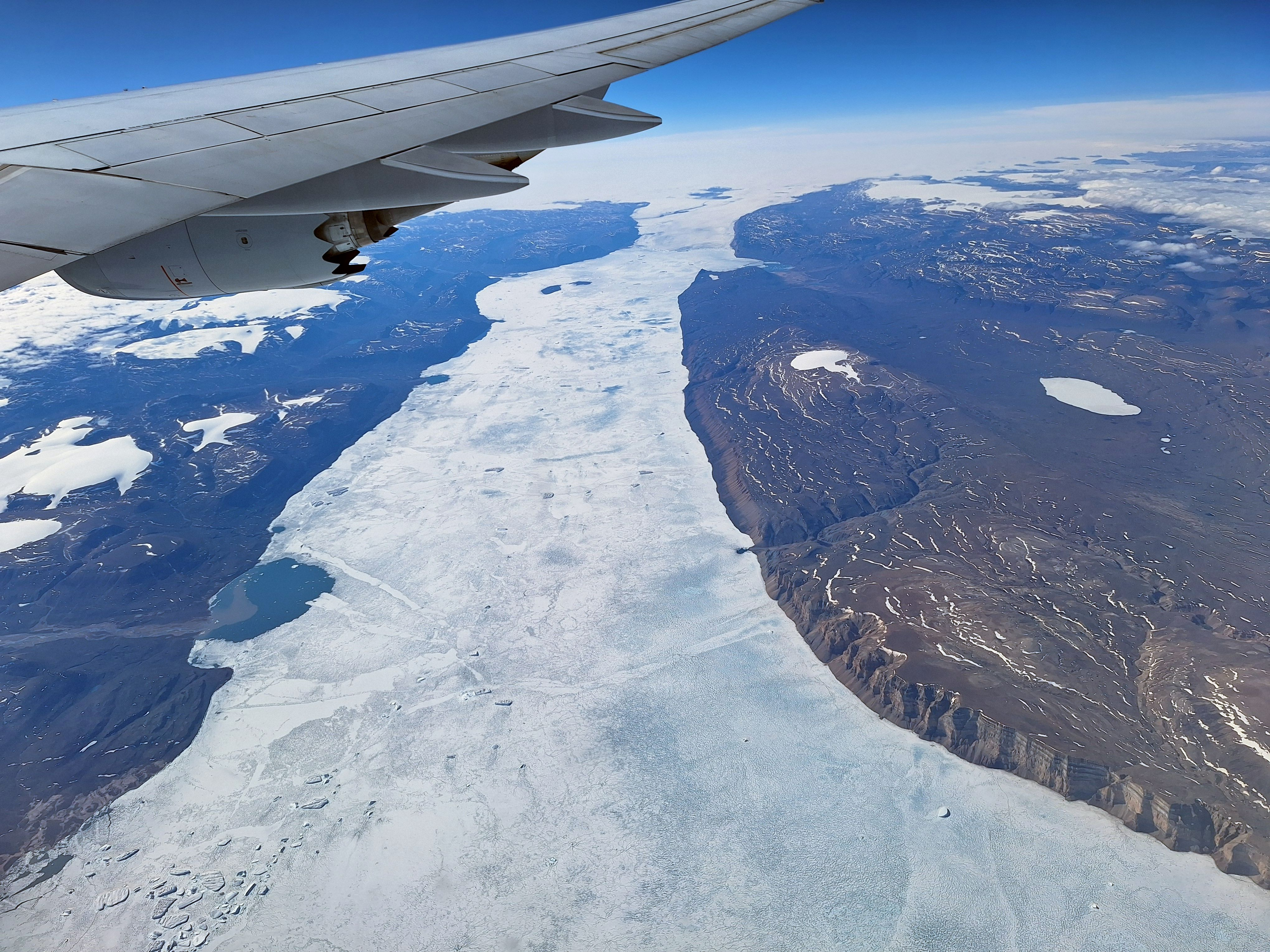
- Aerial photo of Hagen Fjord in July 2026

- Location in Greenland
- Location: Arctic
- Coordinates: 81°40′N 25°30′W
- Ocean/sea sources: Wandel Sea
- Basin countries: Greenland
- Max. length: 90 km (56 mi)
- Max. width: 19 km (12 mi)

Hagen Fjord is a fjord in north-eastern Greenland. It was named after Niels Peter Høeg Hagen, the cartographer of the main exploration team of the ill-fated Denmark expedition.

== Geography ==
It opens into the southern shore of the Independence Fjord at its northern end, between J.C. Christensen Land to the west and Mylius-Erichsen Land to the east, near the confluence of Denmark Sound and Independence Fjord. The Hagen Glacier has its terminus at the head of the fjord.

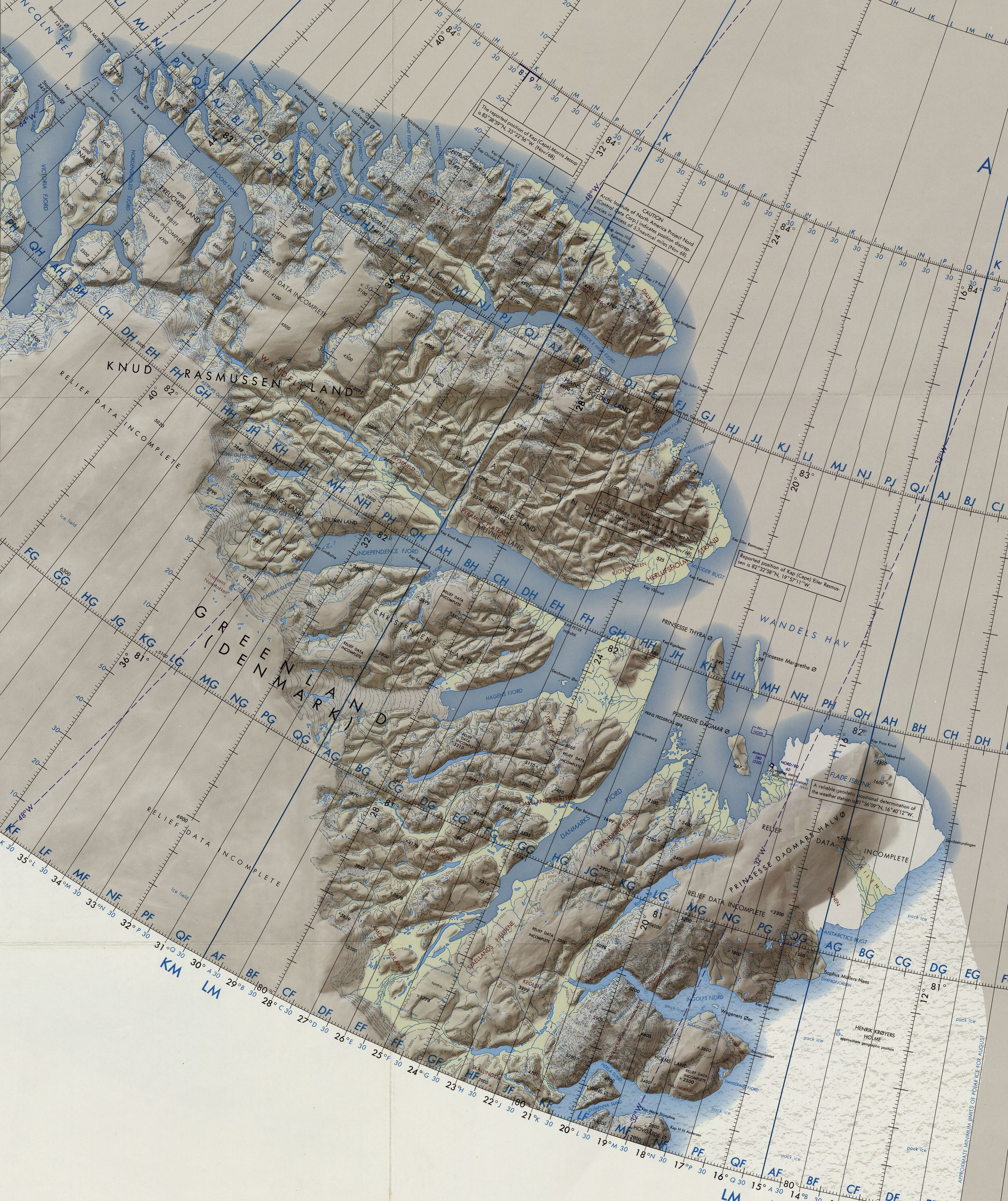
Map of Northeastern Greenland

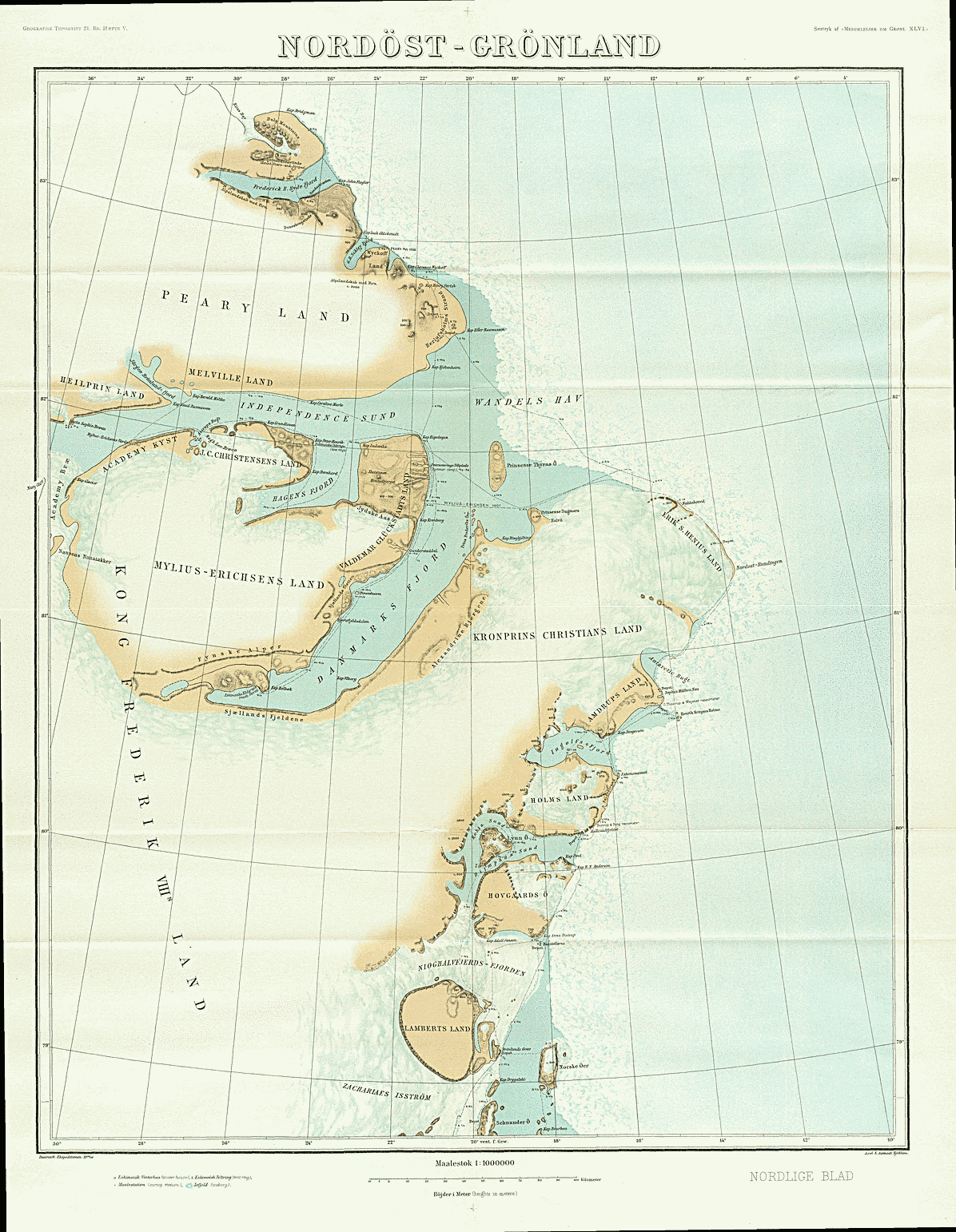
1911 map of NE Greenland showing the Denmark Fjord

== See also ==
- List of fjords of Greenland
