= List of rivers of Greenland =

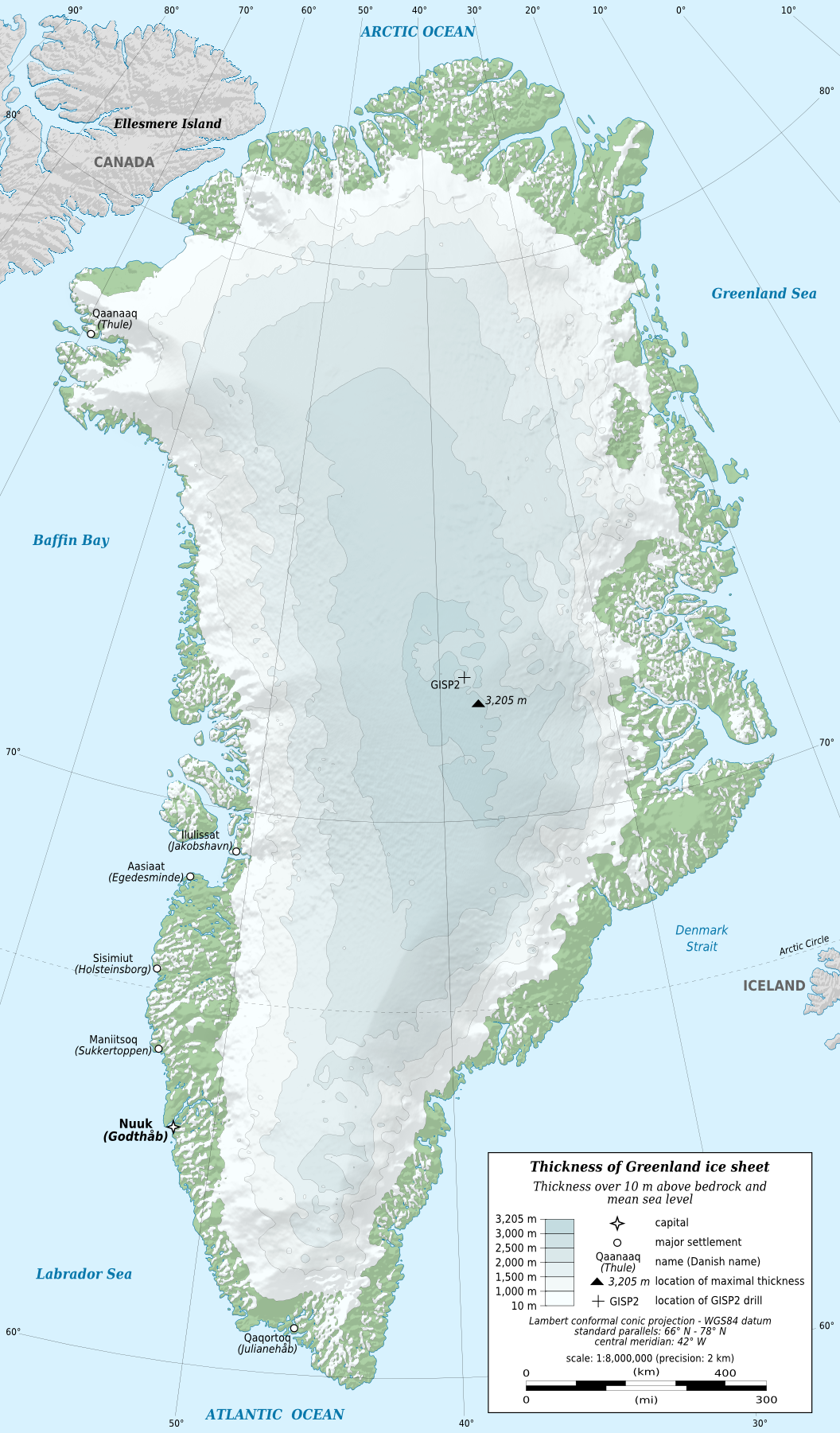
Map of Greenland icesheets

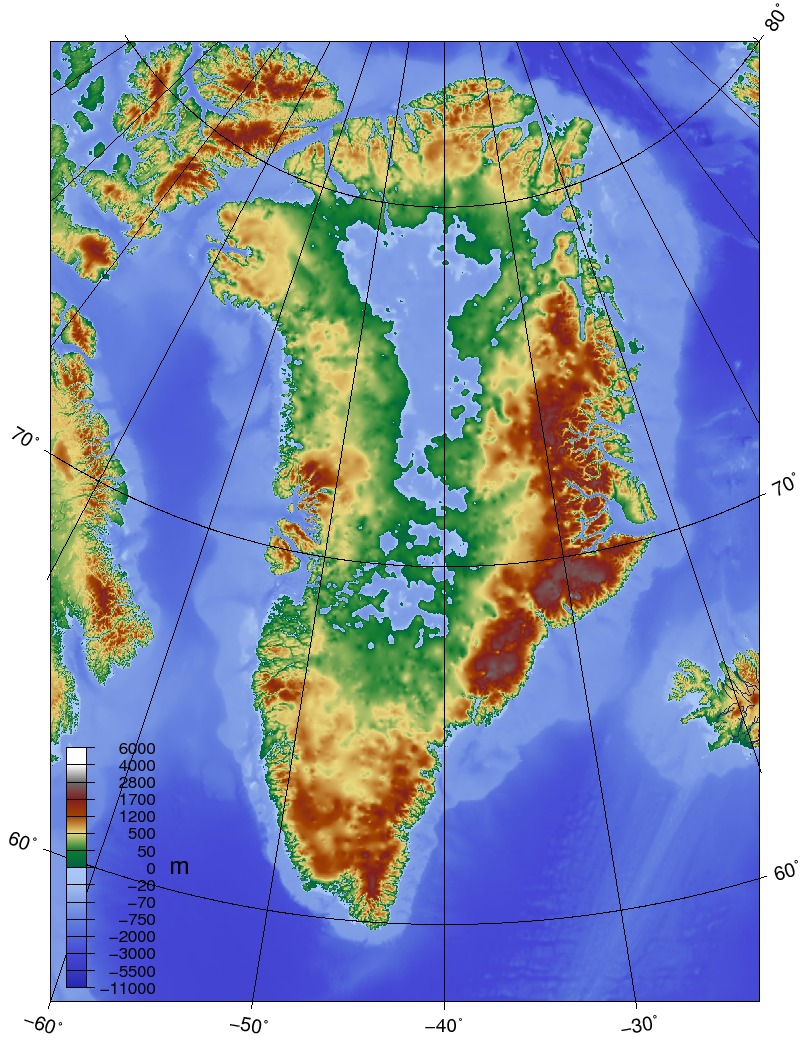
Map of Greenland bedrock

This is a list of rivers of Greenland. Greenland is an autonomous territory within the Kingdom of Denmark, located between the Arctic and Atlantic oceans, east of the Canadian Arctic Archipelago. Most rivers in Greenland are formed from melting of glaciers.

== Eastern coast ==
- Børglum Elv (largest river), 82°11′00″N 30°20′00″W
- Gudenelv, 72°26′00″N 22°42′00″W
- Marrakajik (Schuchert River), 71°16′00″N 24°40′00″W
- Primulaelv, 70°45′00″N 22°40′00″W
- Zackenberg Bay, 74°27′00″N 20°40′00″W

== Western coast ==
- Akuliarusiarsuup Kuua, 67°01′10″N 50°39′20″W
- Isortup Kuua
- Isuitsup Kuua (Igassup Kuua), 65°35′00″N 51°45′00″W
- Kapisillit River
- Majorqaq, 63°13′00″N 49°59′00″W
- Minturn Elv (Minturn River), 78°48′07″N 69°17′47″W
- Pinguarsuup Alannguata Kuussua
- Qinnguata Kuussua, 67°0′20″N 50°18′00″W
- Rode Eleve or Rodelv (Yellow River), 73°55′00″N 20°57′00″W
- Sarfartooq (Sarfortok River), 66°29′00″N 51°56′00″W

== Southern tip ==
- Kangia River
- Narsaq River, 60°54′40″N 46°02′52″W (approximately)
- Narsarsuaq (Narsarssuak River), 61°10′00″N 45°26′00″W
- Tosuut River

== See also ==
- List of rivers of the Americas by coastline
