= Jørgen Brønlund =

Greenlandic polar explorer

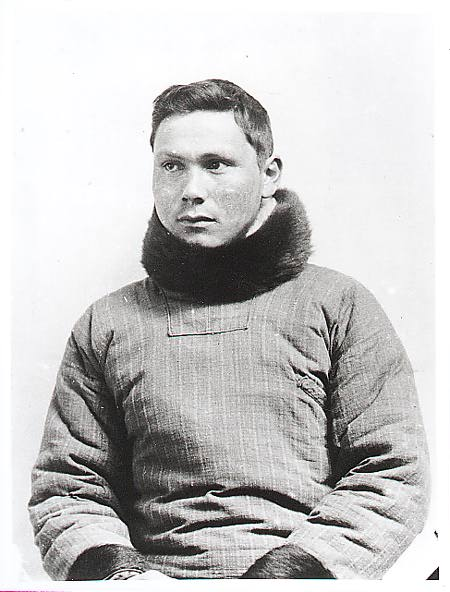
- Born: December 14, 1877; Jacobshavn, Greenland, Kingdom of Denmark
- Died: November 1907 (aged 29); Kap Bergendahl, Lambert Land, Greenland
- Cause of death: Exposure
- Education: Nuuk College
- Known for: Denmark expedition

Jørgen Brønlund (14 December 1877 – November 1907) was a Greenlandic polar explorer, educator, and catechist. He participated in two Danish expeditions to Greenland in the early 20th century.

== Early life and education ==
Brønlund, a Greenlandic Inuk and the son of a hunter, was born in Ilulissat, Greenland, Kingdom of Denmark, then known as Jacobshavn, on 14 December 1877. He was a childhood friend of Knud Rasmussen whose father was a priest in Jacobshavn. Trained as a teacher, Brønlund graduated in 1901 from Nuuk College.

== Career ==
After graduation, he was employed as a catechist at a trading post near the Nuup Kangerlua estuary.

Along with Rasmussen, Harald Moltke, and Ludvig Mylius-Erichsen, Brønlund was a member of the 1902-1903 Danish Literary Greenland Expedition. At its conclusion, Brønlund went to Denmark. Here, he studied drawing with Kristian Zahrtmann and taught in Askov at Denmark's largest folk high school.

An expert interpreter, one of Brønlund's responsibilities during the 1906 Danish Expedition to Northeast Greenland under Mylius-Erichsen was to keep a travel diary, and to drive the dogs. He died in November 1907 of hunger and freezing while travelling back from the Independence Fjord and attempting to return to their base camp. He was found near the depot in Lambert Land on 13 March 1908 along with his diary that recounted the fate of Mylius-Erichsen and the expedition's cartographer, Niels Peter Høeg Hagen, both of whom died before Brønlund in Nioghalvfjerdsbrae at 79° latitude. He was buried where he was found, at Kap Bergendahl in southeast Lambert Land. The headland is also known today as Brønlunds Grave (Danish: Brønlunds Grav).

The last entry of his diary reads as follows:

I perished in 77° N lat., under the hardships of the return journey over the inland ice in November. I reached this place under a waning moon, and cannot go on, because of my frozen feet and the darkness. The bodies of the others are in the middle of the fjord. Hagen died on November 15, Mylius-Erichsen some ten days later.

== Legacy ==
The 172-page diary is archived at the Royal Danish Library. A memorial stone erected in Copenhagen's harbor quotes the diary's last lines.

Jørgen Brønlund Fjord in Peary Land is named in his honor. The one hundred year anniversary of his birth was commemorated by the issue of a Greenlandic postal stamp.

Also by a medallion of G (Eugene L. Daub), Sculptor, Pennsylvania:

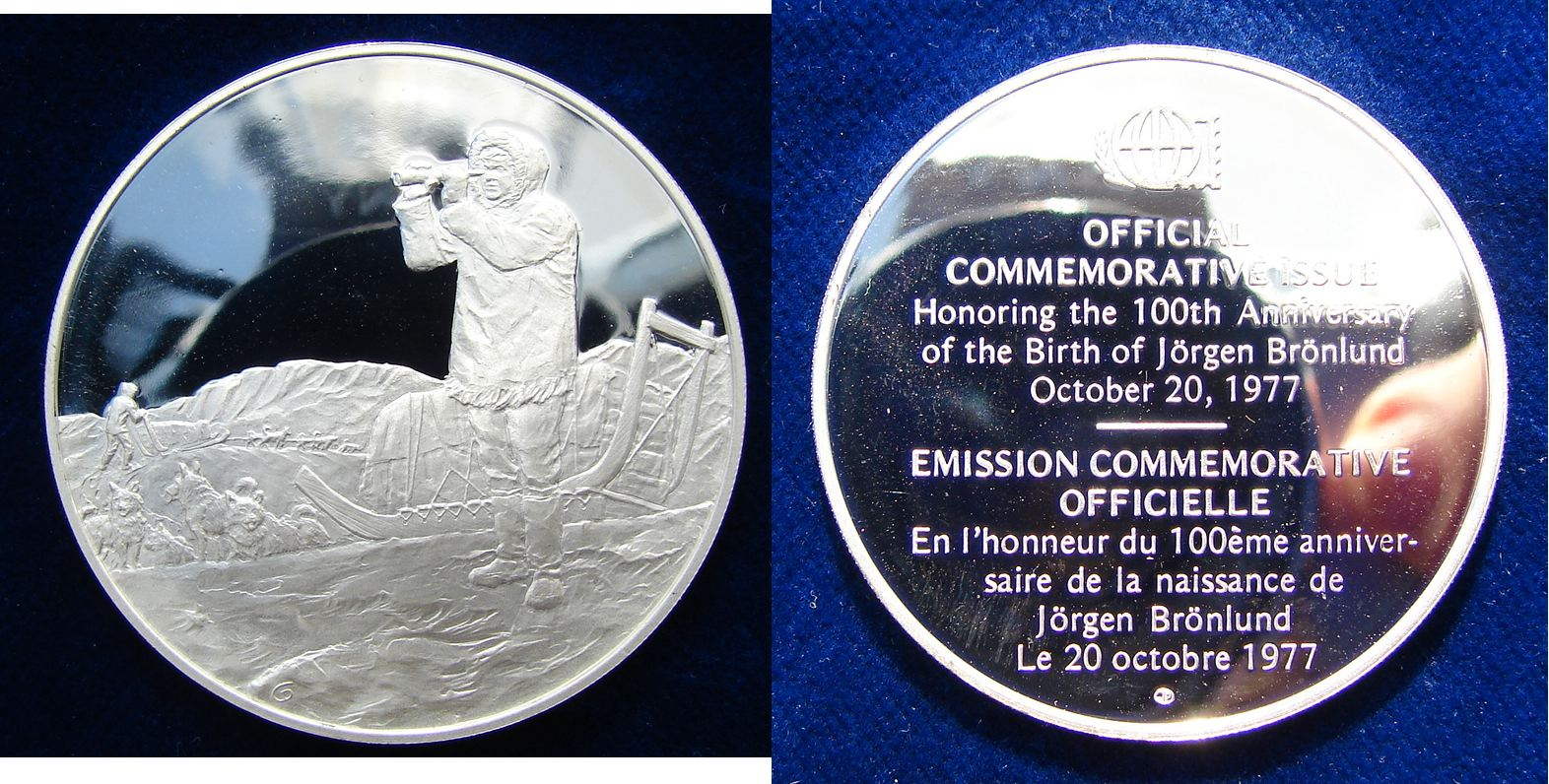
Jørgen Brønlund Medal 100th Birthday
