= Jørgen Brønlund Fjord =

Waterbody in Greenland

- Brønlund Fjord
- Location in Greenland
- Location: Arctic
- Coordinates: 82°7′N 29°58′W
- Ocean/sea sources: Independence Fjord; Wandel Sea
- Basin countries: Greenland
- Max. length: 30 km (19 mi)
- Max. width: 2 km (1.2 mi)

Jørgen Brønlund Fjord or Brønlund Fjord is a fjord in southern Peary Land, northern Greenland.

It was named after polar explorer Jørgen Brønlund by the Danmark expedition.

== Geography ==
It runs roughly from NW to SE with its mouth located at the western end of Melville Land, between Cape Harald Moltke to the east and Cape Knud Rasmussen to the west. It is about 30 kilometres (19 mi) long and 1 kilometre (1 mi) to 2 kilometres (1 mi) wide, and opens out to Independence Fjord in the south. The Børglum River has its mouth on the left side of the fjord.

Brønlundhus, a former research station, is located on the west side close to the mouth of the fjord, and Kap Harald Moltke, another similar facility, on the east side. Brønlundhus was, until 1950, the northernmost radio outpost in the world.

The northern shore is the type locality of the Buen Formation.

== See also ==
- Brønlund Fjord Group
- Deltaterrasserne
- List of fjords of Greenland
- List of features in Greenland named after Greenlandic Inuit
