= Independence Fjord =

Fjord or sound in the eastern part of northern Greenland

- Independence Sound
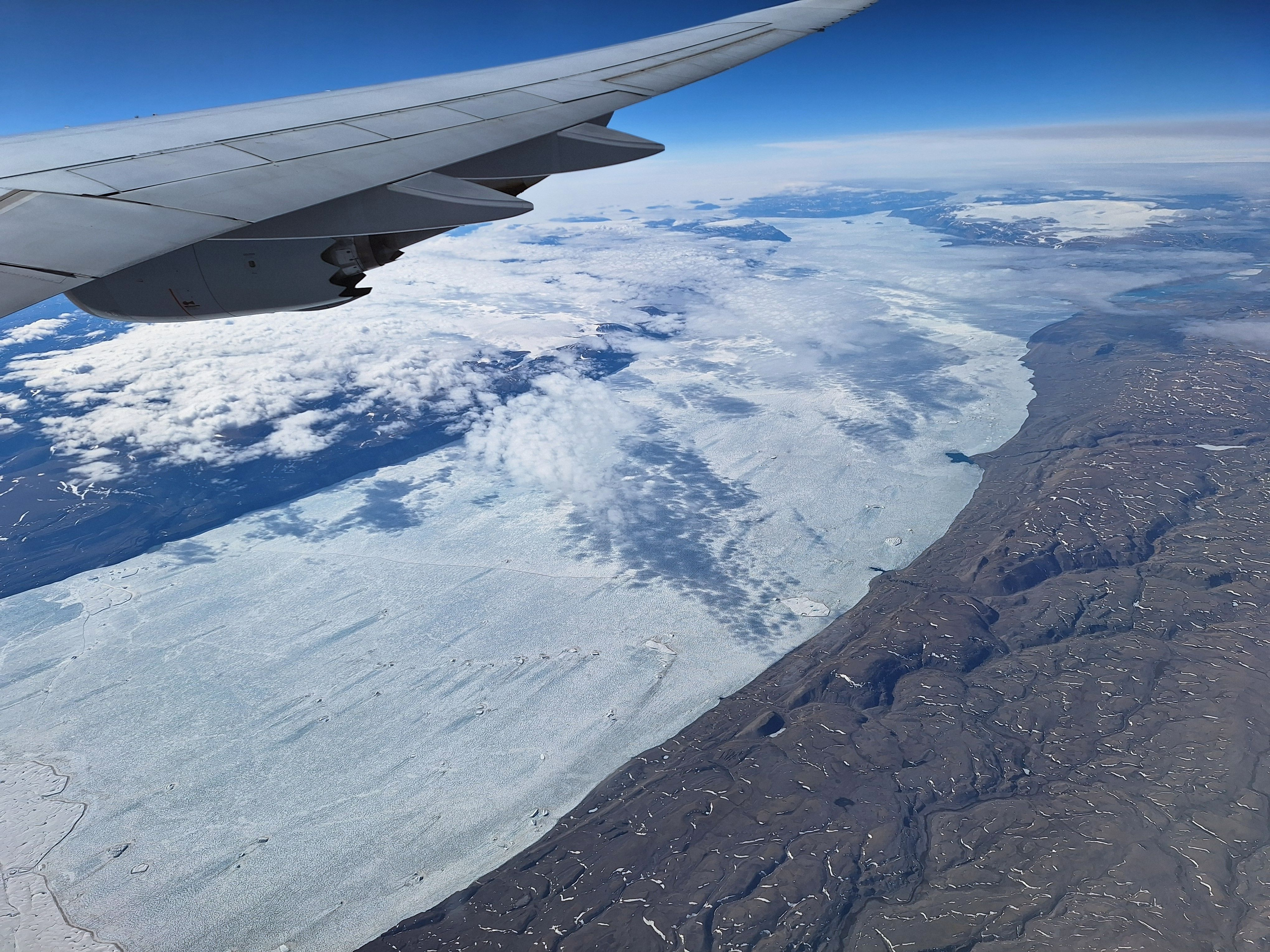
- Aerial photo of Independence Fjord in July 2026

- Location in Greenland
- Location: Arctic
- Coordinates: 82°08′N 28°00′W
- Ocean/sea sources: Wandel Sea
- Basin countries: Greenland
- Max. length: 130 km (81 mi)
- Max. width: 16 km (9.9 mi)

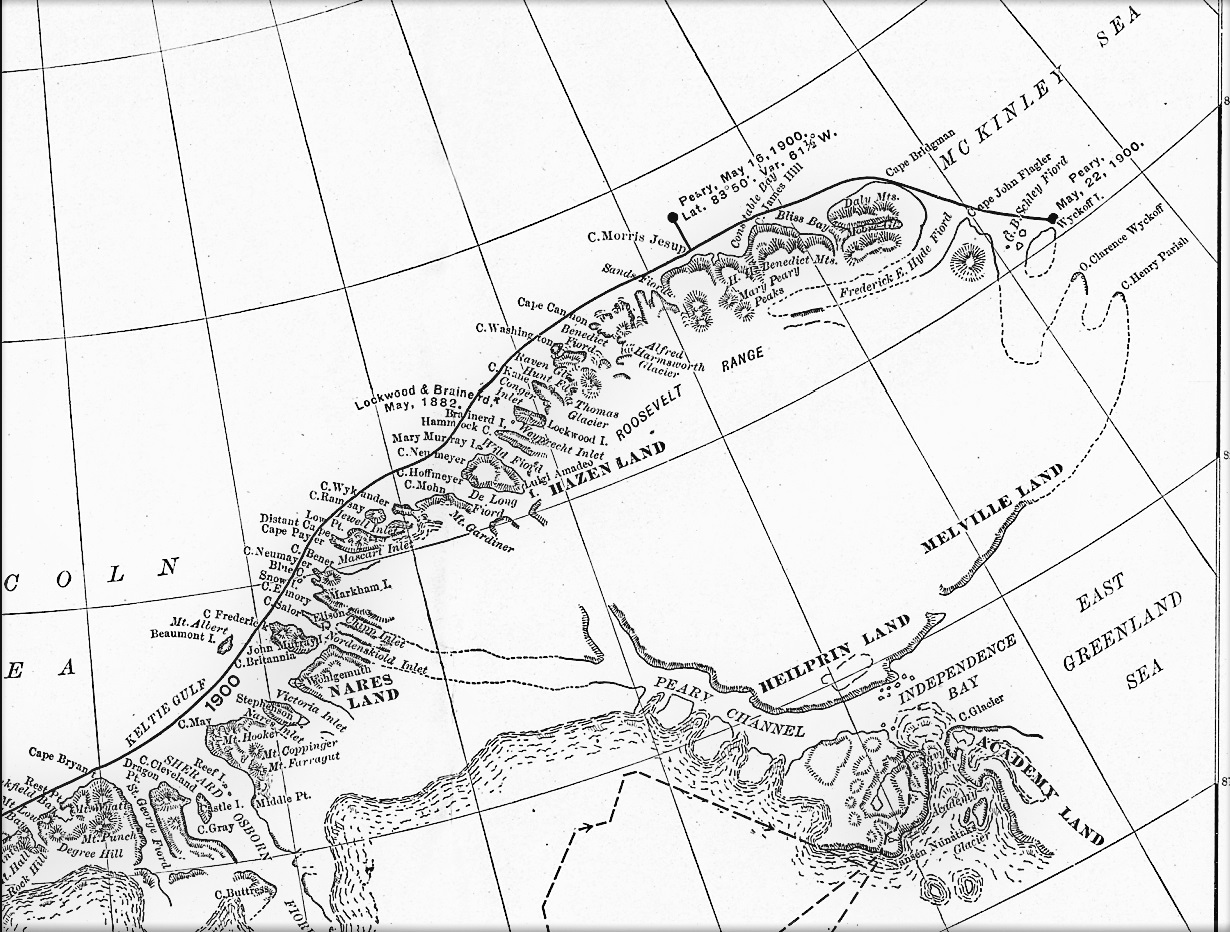
Robert Peary's 1903 Northern Greenland map section showing "Independence Bay", Academy Land, Peary Channel and other geographical features he mapped in the area.

Independence Fjord or Independence Sound is a large fjord or sound in the eastern part of northern Greenland. It is about 200 km (120 mi) long and up to 30 km (19 mi) wide. Its mouth, opening to the Wandel Sea of the Arctic Ocean is located at 82°15′N 21°54′W.

In the area around Independence Fjord there are traces of two paleo-Eskimo cultures that were named Independence I culture and Independence II culture after the fjord.

== Geography ==
This fjord marks the northern boundary of King Frederick VIII Land. The Marie Sophie Glacier and the Academy Glacier have their terminus at the head of the fjord. Jørgen Brønlund Fjord is a small fjord branching northwest from the northern shore of Independence Fjord, at the western limit of Melville Land. Astrup Fjord and Hagen Fjord have their mouths on the southern coast of the fjord. The latter is a larger fjord, with the Hagen Glacier at its head, branching closer to its mouth.

Princess Thyra Island and Princess Margaret Island are two islands located at the confluence of Denmark Fjord and Independence Fjord.

== History ==
The head of the fjord was first put on the map by Robert Peary, who reached the area of the head of the fjord in 1892 together with Eivind Astrup and gave the fjord its name. Peary had mapped the fjord as a bay or sound, leading westwards through the Peary Channel. To the east the coast of "Academy Land" was trending southeastwards.

The ill-fated Denmark expedition 1906-1908 mapped the whole fjord from its mouth in the east, showing its true extent. The three expedition members who had explored the fjord on dogsleds, Ludvig Mylius-Erichsen, Niels Peter Høeg Hagen and Jørgen Brønlund, were not able to return to their base and died.

The traces of ancient human settlements in the area have been the subject of research since the beginning of the 20th century. The first notable research results were published in 1911 by Christian Bendix Thostrup, a member of the Denmark Expedition.

=== Pre-history ===
North of the fjord, in southern Peary Land, there are remains of dwellings with elliptical floor plan, built by Early Paleoeskimo Independence I culture. These people used tools made from rocks and bones, and subsisted from hunting wildlife like musk oxen and Arctic hares. Bones of musk oxen hunted down in Peary Land show that the area was inhabited at 2000 BC. The oldest discoveries are dated at 2400 BC. Discoveries of the time starting around 1800 BC until 1300 BC were mostly made south of Independence Fjord. It is unknown whether the Independence I culture vanished or the people moved south.

Discoveries of a later time, about 800 BC to 200 BC, are related to the Independence II culture. Initially, Independence I and Independence II had been regarded as the same culture, but Eigil Knuth found in 1956 that the two were separate cultures, because of different dwelling constructions, and differences in other artefacts. The residential dwellings of Independence II are more complex and larger than the older buildings in this area. Like their predecessors, the people of Independence II also settled south of Independence Fjord.

In both cases it is unclear whether discoveries in other areas of North Greenland and on Ellesmere Island should be attributed to other cultures.

== Image gallery ==
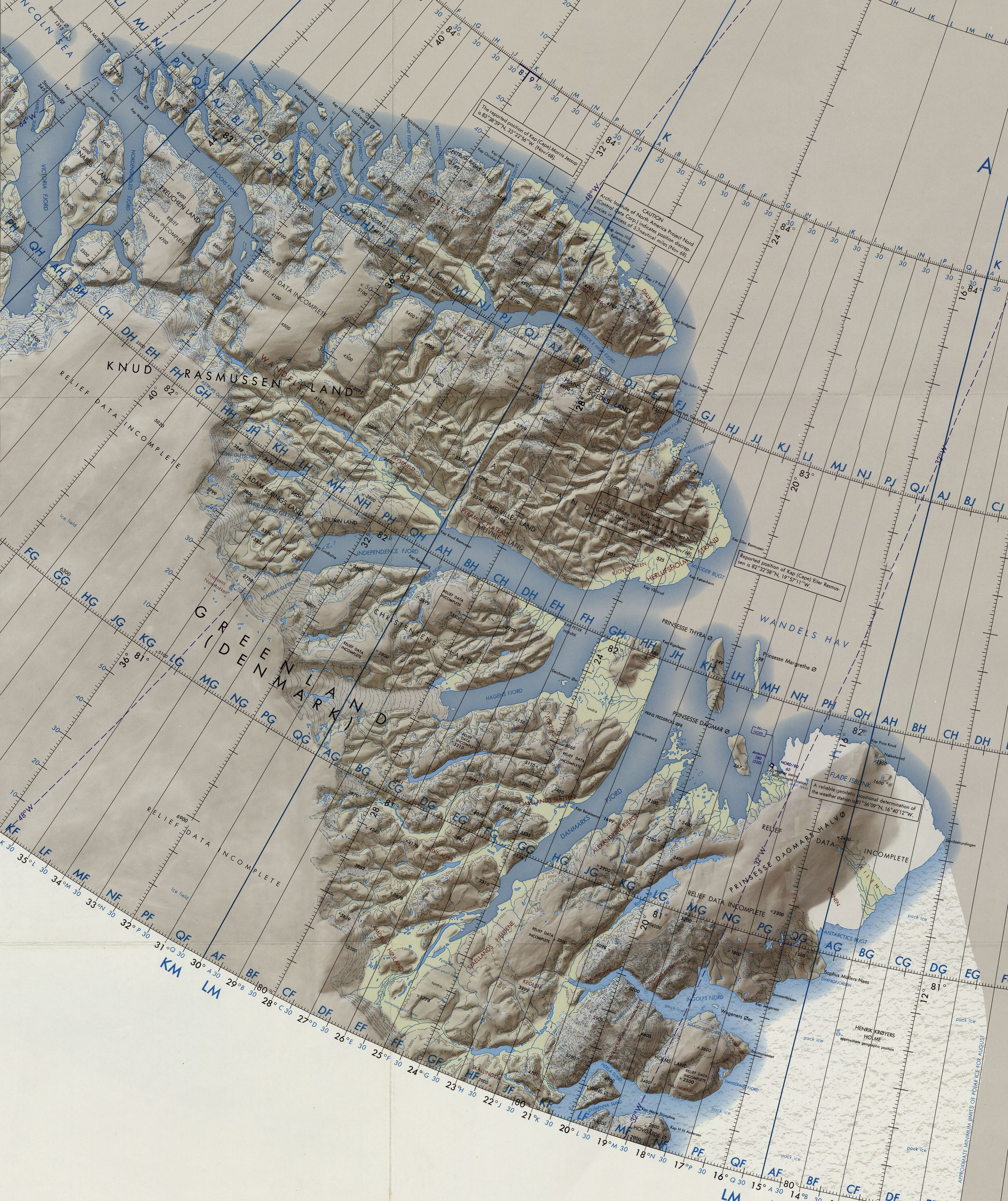
Map of Northeastern Greenland

Areas of Independence I and Independence II cultures around Independence Fjord

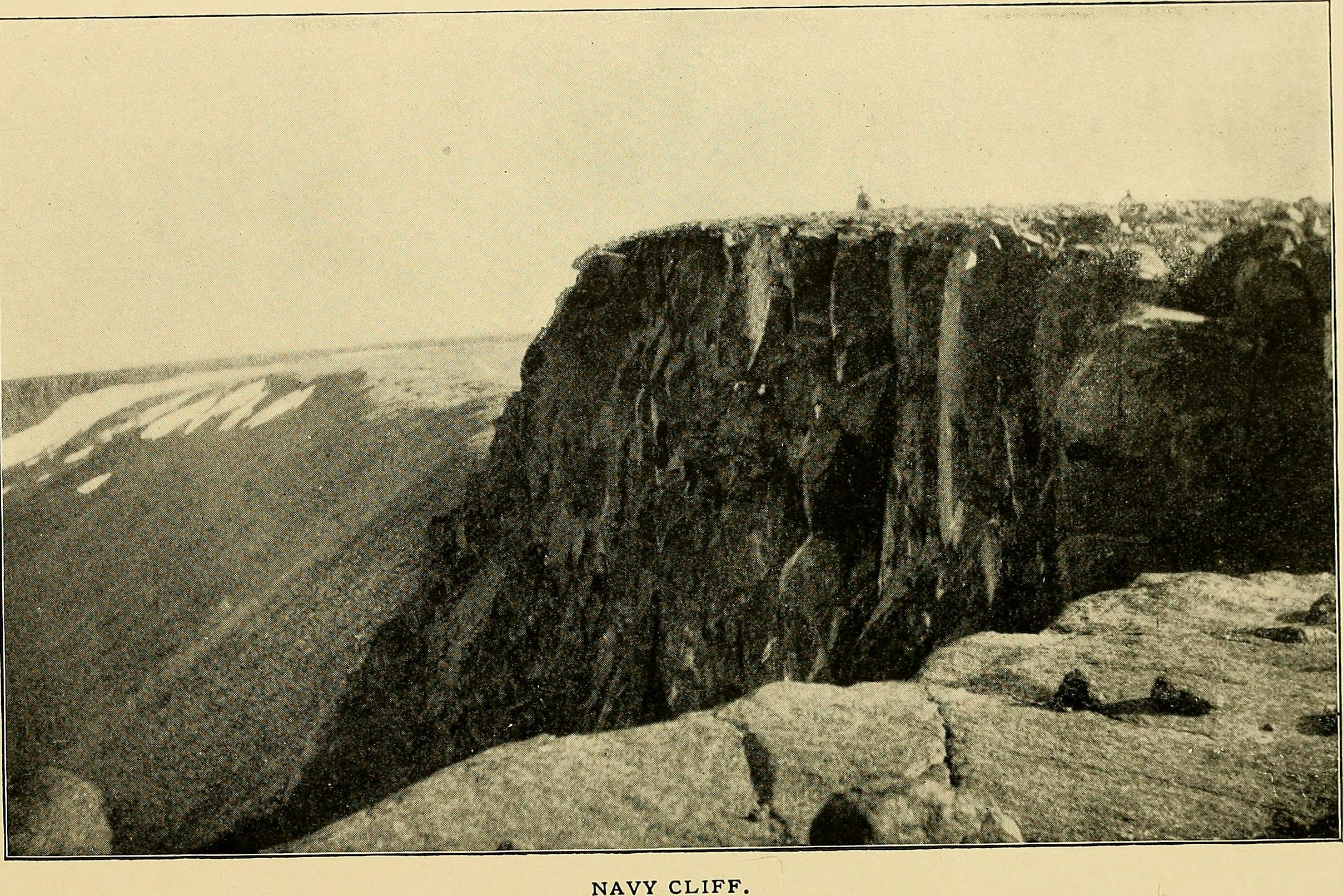
Navy Cliff in Independence Fjord picture taken during the First Thule Expedition

== See also ==
- List of fjords of Greenland
