= 134th Regiment =

134th Regiment may refer to:

- 134th Regiment of Foot, British Army
- 134th Cavalry Regiment, previously the 134th Infantry Regiment, United States Army

== American Civil War regiments ==
- 134th Illinois Infantry Regiment
- 134th Indiana Infantry Regiment
- 134th New York Infantry Regiment
- 134th Ohio Infantry Regiment
- 134th Pennsylvania Infantry Regiment

== See also ==
- 2nd Battalion, 134th Infantry Regiment
- 134th Division (disambiguation)
- 134th (disambiguation)
