= 134th =

134th may refer to:

== American Civil War regiments ==
- 134th Illinois Infantry Regiment
- 134th Indiana Infantry Regiment
- 134th New York Infantry Regiment
- 134th Ohio Infantry Regiment
- 134th Pennsylvania Infantry Regiment

== Other military units ==
- 134th Air Refueling Wing, unit located at McGhee Tyson ANGB, Tennessee
- 134th Armoured Division Freccia, Cavalry Division of the Italian Army during World War II
- 134th Battalion (48th Highlanders), CEF, unit in the Canadian Expeditionary Force during the Great War
- 134th Cavalry Regiment, former infantry regiment in the US Army National Guard
- 134th (Cornwall) Heavy Battery, Royal Garrison Artillery, a British howitzer battery
- 134th Division (Imperial Japanese Army), formed in 1945 in Jiamusi
- 134th Fighter Squadron, unit which flies the F-16C Fighting Falcon
- 134th (2/1st Hampshire) Brigade, formation of the Territorial Force of the British Army
- 134th Infantry Division (Wehrmacht), German division in World War II
- 134th (Loyal Limerick) Regiment of Foot, infantry regiment of the British Army, created in 1794 and disbanded in 1796

== Other uses ==
- 134th Delaware General Assembly, 1987–1989
- 134th Georgia General Assembly, 1977–1979
- 134th Kentucky Derby, a 2008 horse race
- 134th meridian east, line of longitude across the Arctic Ocean, Asia, Australia, the Indian Ocean, the Southern Ocean, and Antarctica
- 134th meridian west, line of longitude across the Arctic Ocean, North America, the Pacific Ocean, the Southern Ocean, and Antarctica
- 134th Street (Manhattan), New York, United States
- Pennsylvania's 134th Representative District, in Lehigh County

== See also ==
- 134 (number)
- AD 134, the year 134 (CXXXIV) of the Julian calendar
- 134 BC
- 134th Division (disambiguation)
- 134th Regiment (disambiguation)
- May 14, 134th day of the year in a standard year
