= 134th meridian =

134th meridian may refer to:

- 134th meridian east, a line of longitude east of the Greenwich Meridian
- 134th meridian west, a line of longitude west of the Greenwich Meridian

| 134th meridian west | 134th meridian east |
