= 134 =

134 may refer to:

- 134 (number), the natural number following 133 and preceding 135
- AD 134
- 134 BC
- Route 134 (MBTA), a bus route in Massachusetts, US
- 134 (New Jersey bus)
- 134 Sophrosyne, a main-belt asteroid

== See also ==
- 134th (disambiguation)
