= 133rd =

133rd is the ordinal form of the number 133. 133rd or One hundred and thirty-third may also refer to:

- A fraction, 1/133, equal to one of 133 equal parts

== Geography ==
- 133rd meridian east, a line of longitude
- 133rd meridian west, a line of longitude

== Military ==
- 133rd Brigade (disambiguation)
- 133rd Division (disambiguation)
- 133rd Regiment (disambiguation)

== See also ==
- May 13, 133rd day of the year in a standard year
