= 133rd meridian =

133rd meridian may refer to:

- 133rd meridian east, a line of longitude east of the Greenwich Meridian
- 133rd meridian west, a line of longitude west of the Greenwich Meridian

133rd meridian west	133rd meridian east
