= 46th meridian =

46th meridian may refer to:

- 46th meridian east, a line of longitude east of the Greenwich Meridian
- 46th meridian west, a line of longitude west of the Greenwich Meridian
