= 47th meridian =

47th meridian may refer to:

- 47th meridian east, a line of longitude east of the Greenwich Meridian
- 47th meridian west, a line of longitude west of the Greenwich Meridian
