= 48th meridian =

48th meridian may refer to:

- 48th meridian east, a line of longitude east of the Greenwich Meridian
- 48th meridian west, a line of longitude west of the Greenwich Meridian
