= 135th meridian =

135th meridian may refer to:

- 135th meridian east, a line of longitude east of the Greenwich Meridian
- 135th meridian west, a line of longitude west of the Greenwich Meridian

135th meridian west	135th meridian east
