= 132nd meridian =

132nd meridian may refer to:

- 132nd meridian east, a line of longitude east of the Greenwich Meridian
- 132nd meridian west, a line of longitude west of the Greenwich Meridian

132nd meridian west	132nd meridian east
