= 133rd Brigade =

133rd Brigade may refer to:

- 133rd Mixed Brigade
- 133rd Infantry Brigade (United Kingdom)

== See also ==
- 133rd Division (disambiguation)
- 133rd Regiment (disambiguation)
