= 1982 North Indian Ocean cyclone season =

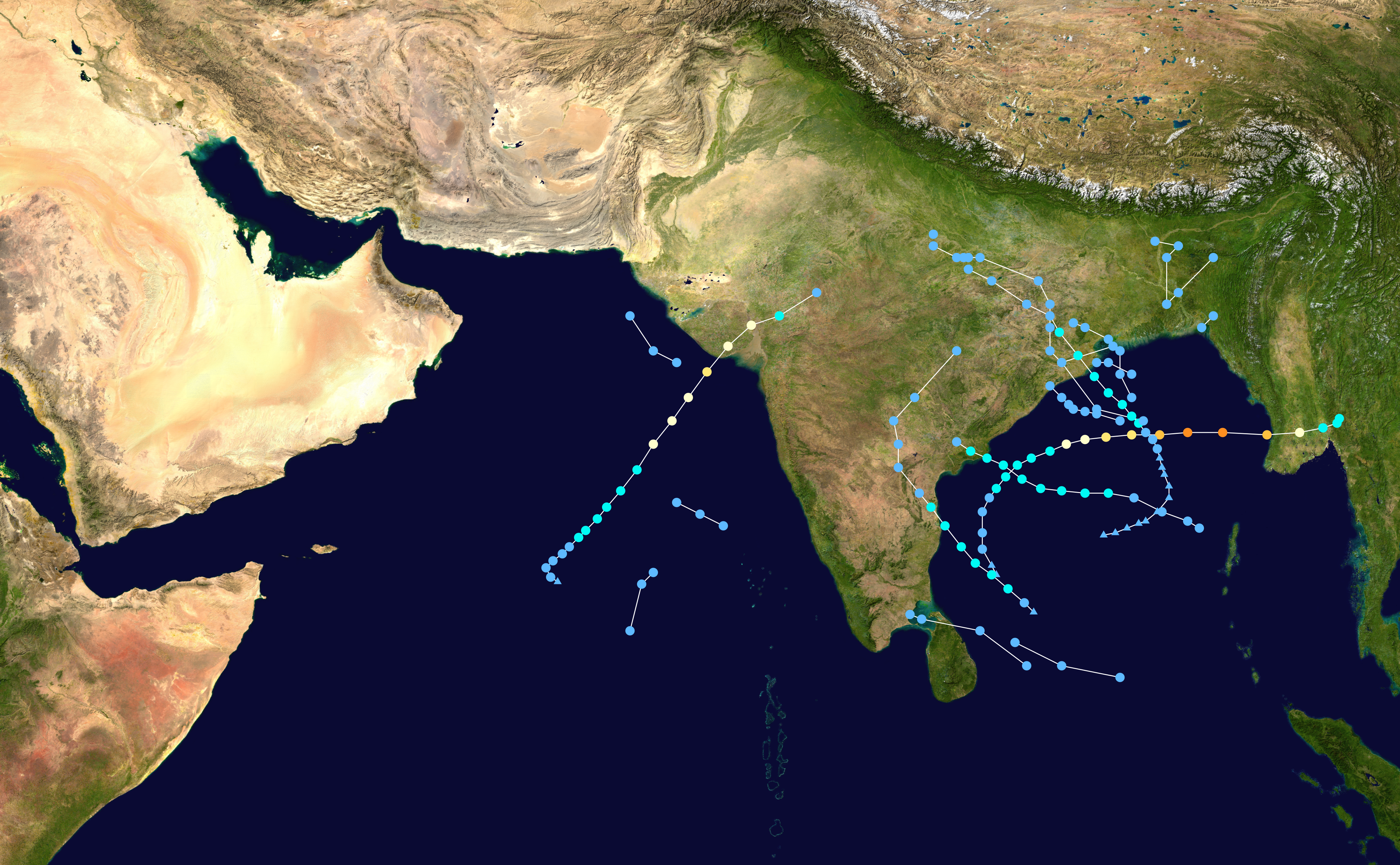
- Season summary map

Seasonal boundaries
- First system formed: May 1, 1982
- Last system dissipated: December 4, 1982

Strongest storm
- Name: BOB 01
  - Maximum winds: 215 km/h (130 mph) (3-minute sustained)
  - Lowest pressure: 940 hPa (mbar)

Seasonal statistics
- Depressions: 19
- Deep depressions: 10
- Cyclonic storms: 5
- Severe cyclonic storms: 5
- Very severe cyclonic storms: 3
- Extremely severe cyclonic storms: 3
- Super cyclonic storms: 0
- Total fatalities: 486
- Total damage: $86.3 million (1982 USD)

Related articles
- 1982 Atlantic hurricane season; 1982 Pacific hurricane season; 1982 Pacific typhoon season

The 1982 North Indian Ocean cyclone season was an above average season. The season has no official bounds but cyclones tend to form between April and December. These dates conventionally delimit the period of each year when most tropical cyclones form in the northern Indian Ocean. There are two main seas in the North Indian Ocean—the Bay of Bengal to the east of the Indian subcontinent and the Arabian Sea to the west of India. The official Regional Specialized Meteorological Centre in this basin is the India Meteorological Department (IMD), while the Joint Typhoon Warning Center (JTWC) releases unofficial advisories. An average of five tropical cyclones form in the North Indian Ocean every season with peaks in May and November. Cyclones occurring between the meridians 45°E and 100°E are included in the season by the IMD.

== Systems ==
=== Extremely Severe Cyclonic Storm BOB 01 ===
- Extremely severe cyclonic storm (IMD)
- Category 4 tropical cyclone (SSHWS)
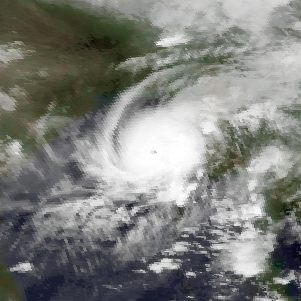
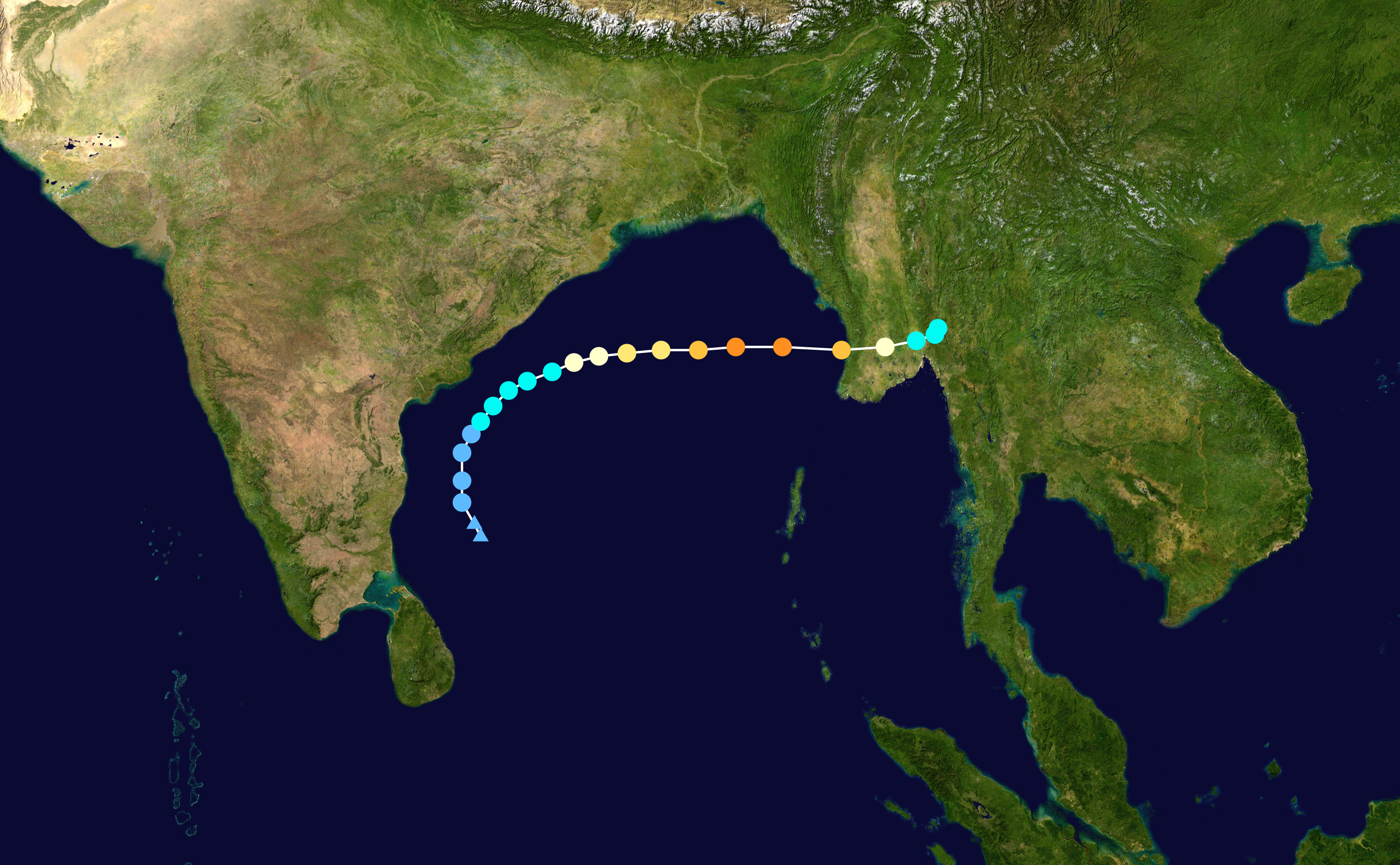
- Duration: May 1 – May 5
- Peak intensity: 215 km/h (130 mph) (3-min); 940 hPa (mbar)

On April 30 the monsoon trough spawned a tropical depression in the western Bay of Bengal. It tracked northeastward, becoming a tropical storm on the 1st and a cyclone on the 2nd. Its movement became more to the east, and the cyclone continued to quickly intensify, reaching a peak of 145 mph winds just before landfall. The small and compact cyclone hit southern Myanmar on the 4th, and it dissipated the next day over land. Moderate to heavy damage was experienced, but advance warning kept the death toll at only five.

=== Extremely Severe Cyclonic Storm BOB 02 ===
- Extremely severe cyclonic storm (IMD)
- Tropical storm (SSHWS)
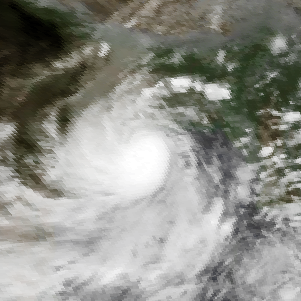
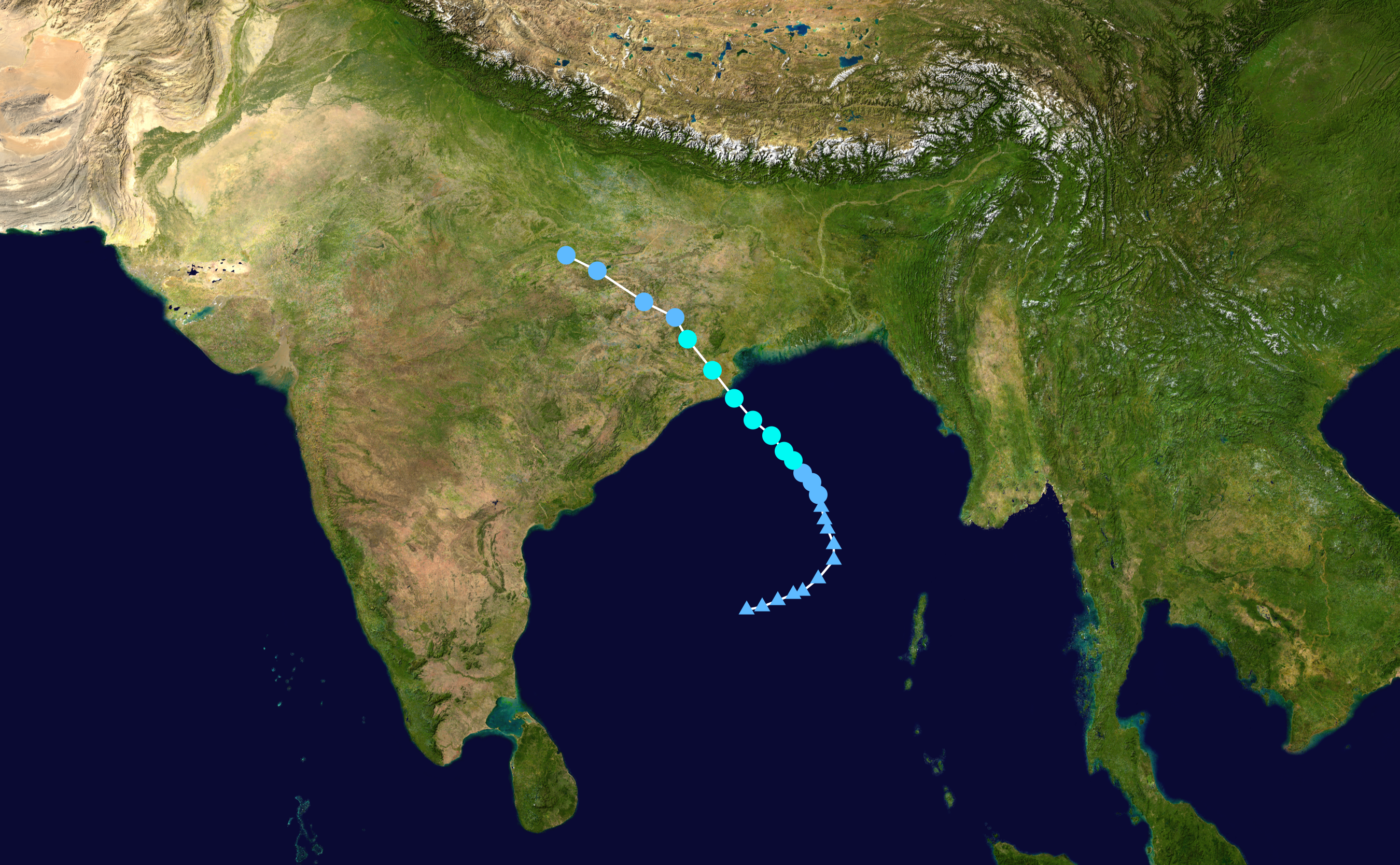
- Duration: May 31 – June 5
- Peak intensity: 165 km/h (105 mph) (3-min); 952 hPa (mbar)

Tropical Depression 2B developed from the monsoon trough in the central Bay of Bengal on May 30. It headed northeastward, becoming a tropical storm later that day and reaching a peak of 65 mph winds on the 31st. The storm turned to the northwest, where it weakened to a tropical depression. It restrengthened, and hit near Paradip, India on the 3rd as a 65 mph tropical storm. The storm brought heavy flooding amounting to 140 fatalities and destroying over 500,000 homes. Whole coast of Odisha suffered major damages. Districts of Puri, Cuttack and Balasore were the worst affected among them.

=== LAND Depression 01 ===
- Depression (IMD)
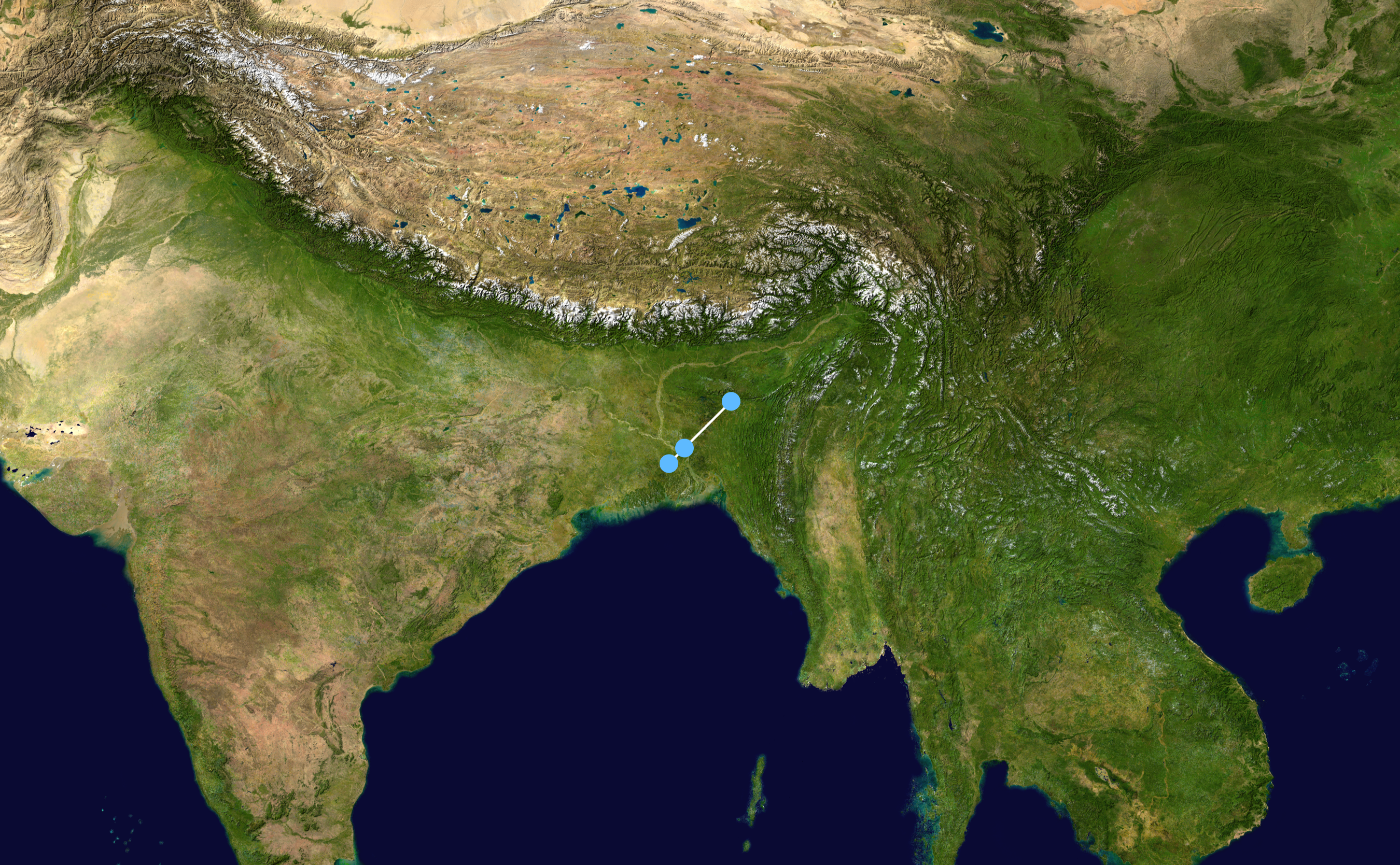
- Duration: June 17 – June 18
- Peak intensity: 45 km/h (30 mph) (3-min);

=== Depression ARB 01 ===
- Depression (IMD)
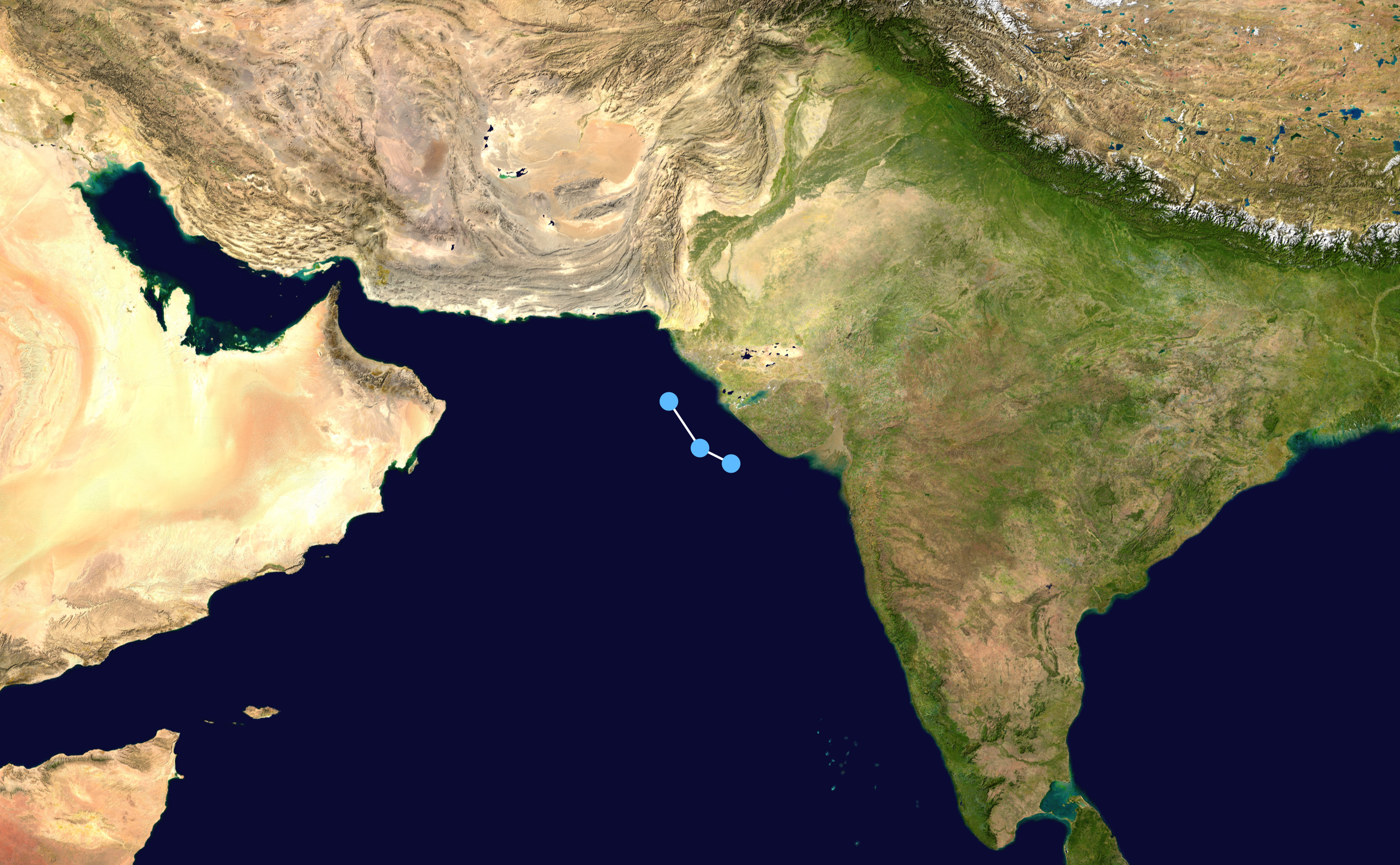
- Duration: July 15 – July 16
- Peak intensity: 45 km/h (30 mph) (3-min);

=== Deep Depression BOB 03 ===
- Deep depression (IMD)
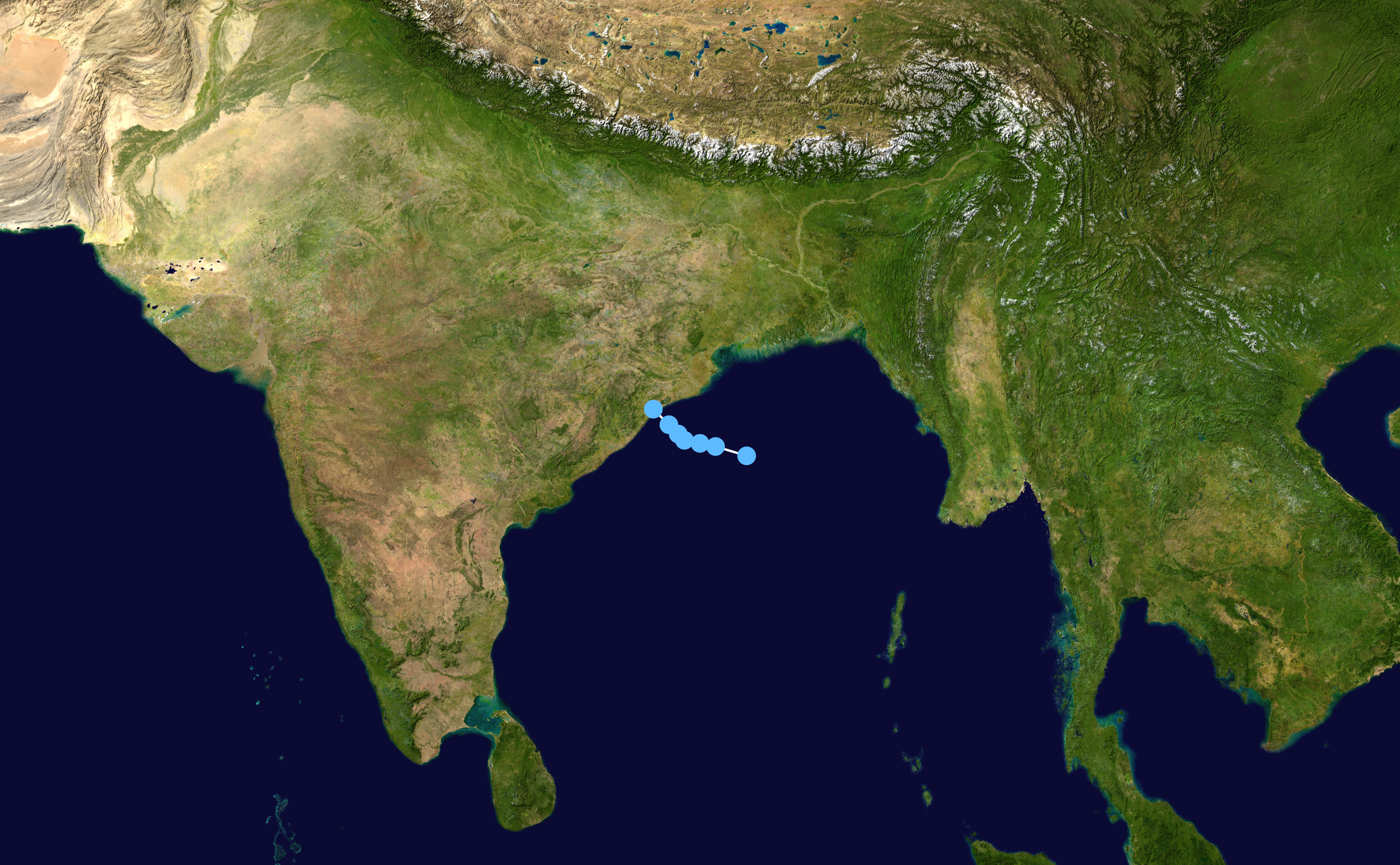
- Duration: July 18 – July 20
- Peak intensity: 55 km/h (35 mph) (3-min);

=== LAND Depression 02 ===
- Depression (IMD)
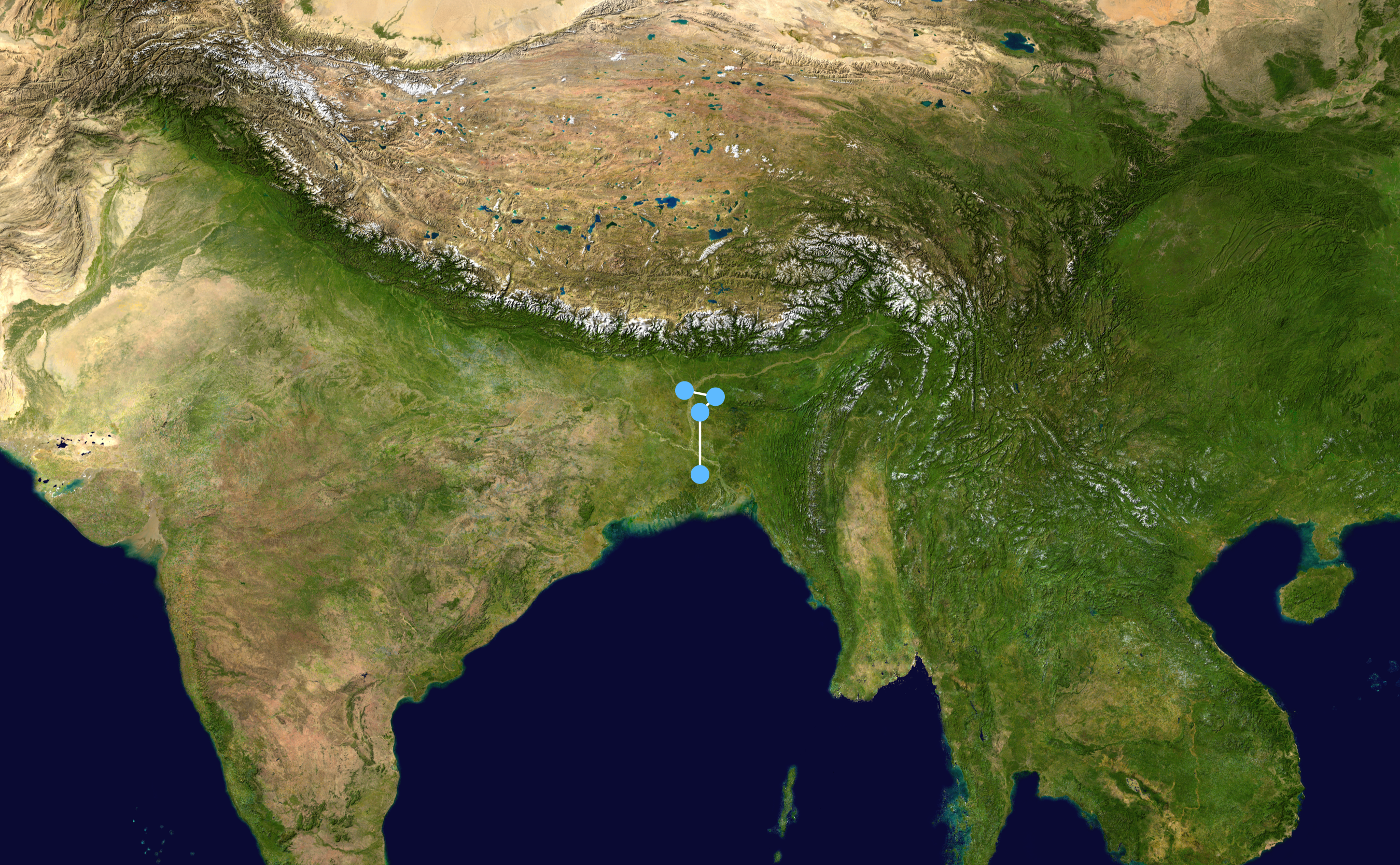
- Duration: August 2 – August 4
- Peak intensity: 45 km/h (30 mph) (3-min);

=== Depression BOB 04 ===
- Depression (IMD)
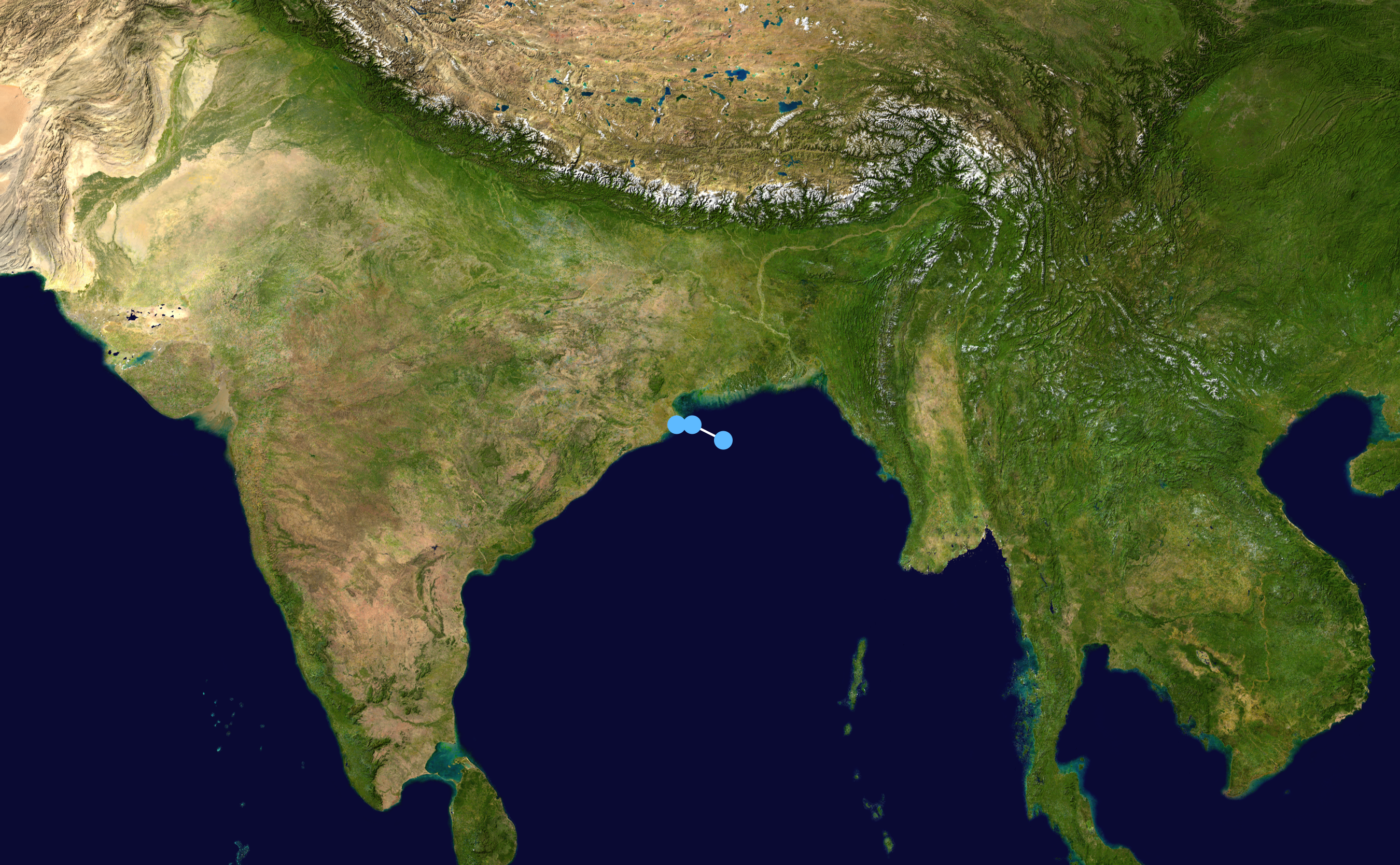
- Duration: August 12 – August 12
- Peak intensity: 45 km/h (30 mph) (3-min);

=== Depression BOB 05 ===
- Depression (IMD)
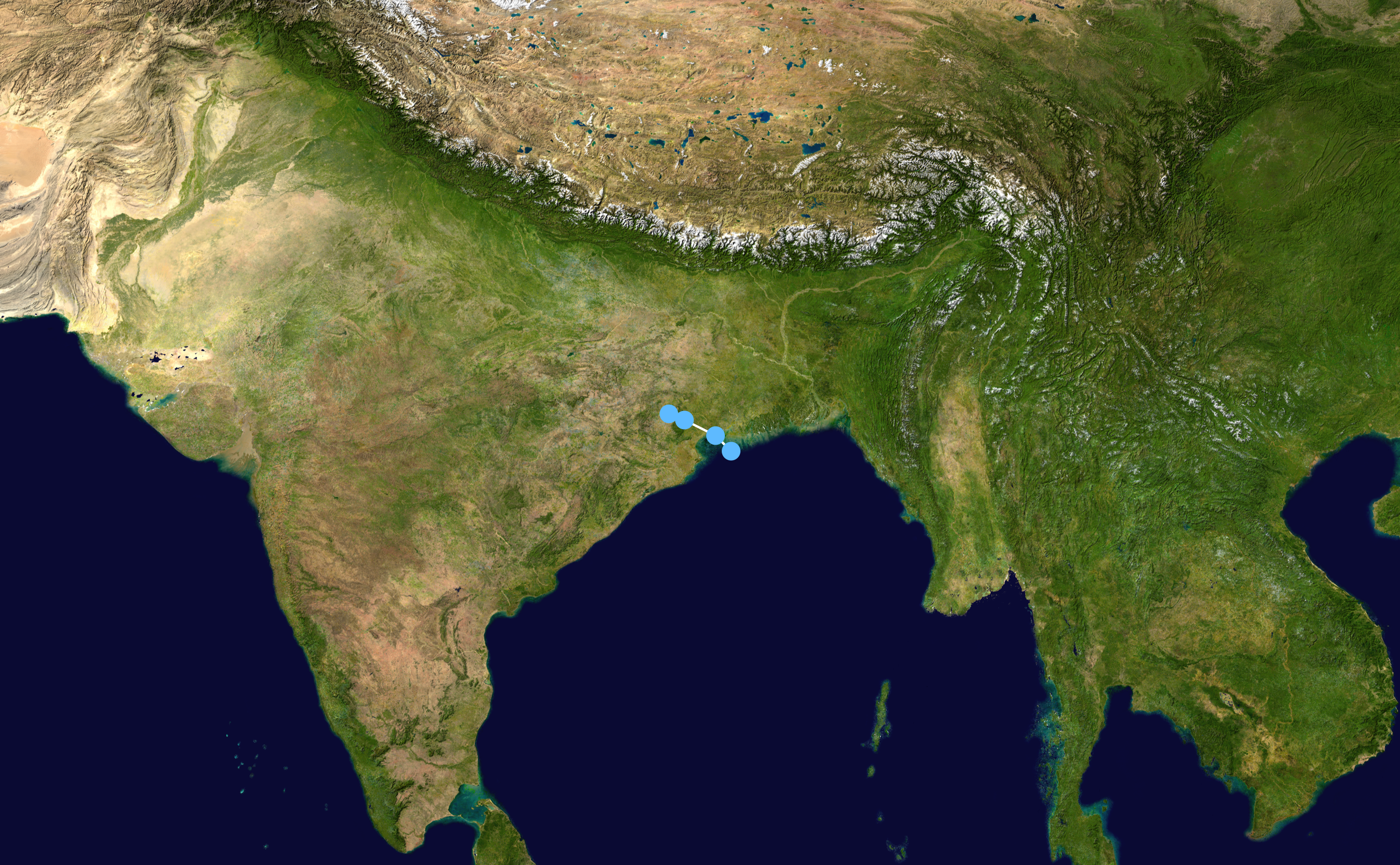
- Duration: August 18 – August 19
- Peak intensity: 45 km/h (30 mph) (3-min);

=== LAND Depression 03 ===
- Depression (IMD)
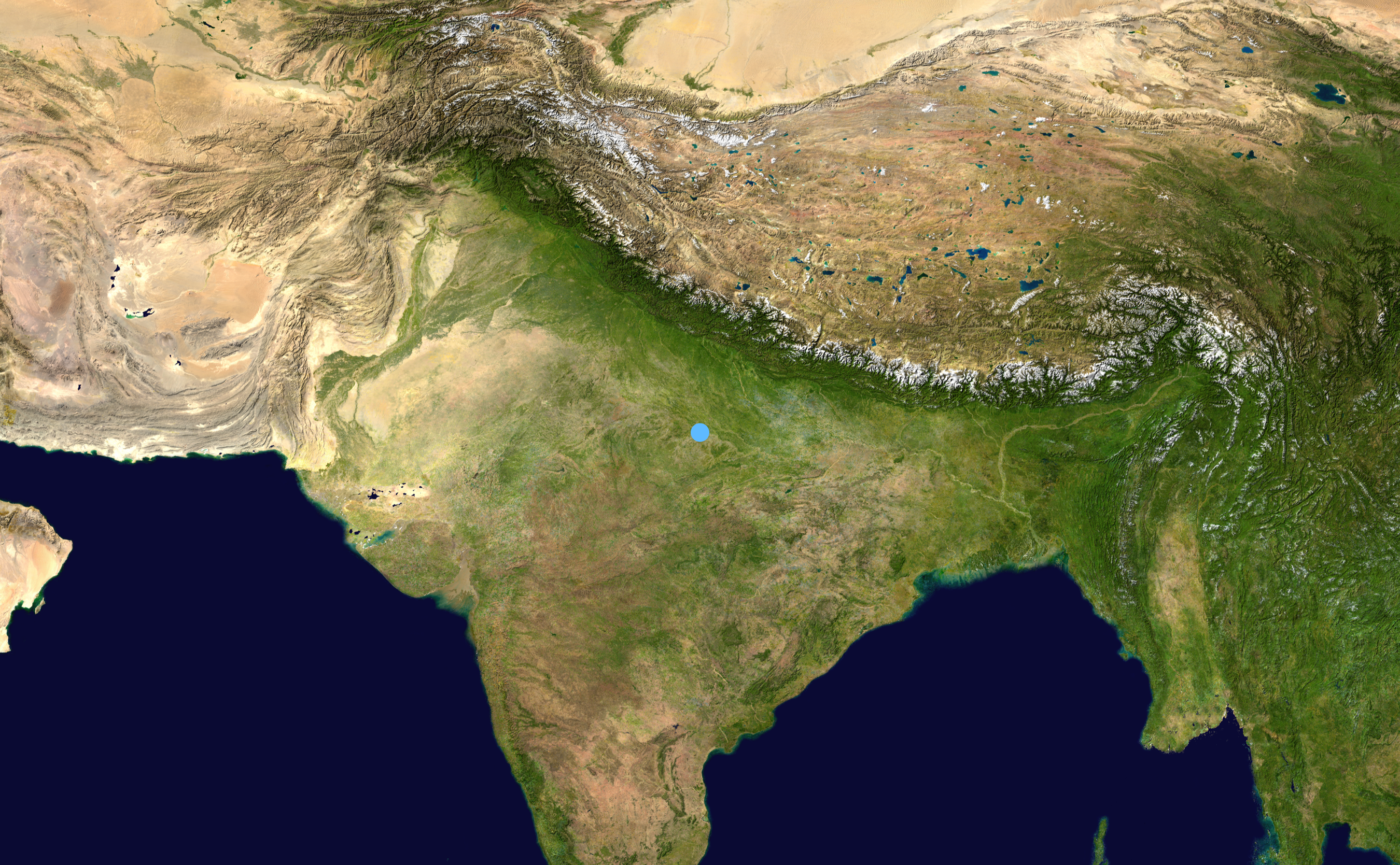
- Duration: August 25 – August 25
- Peak intensity: 45 km/h (30 mph) (3-min);

=== Depression BOB 06 ===
- Depression (IMD)
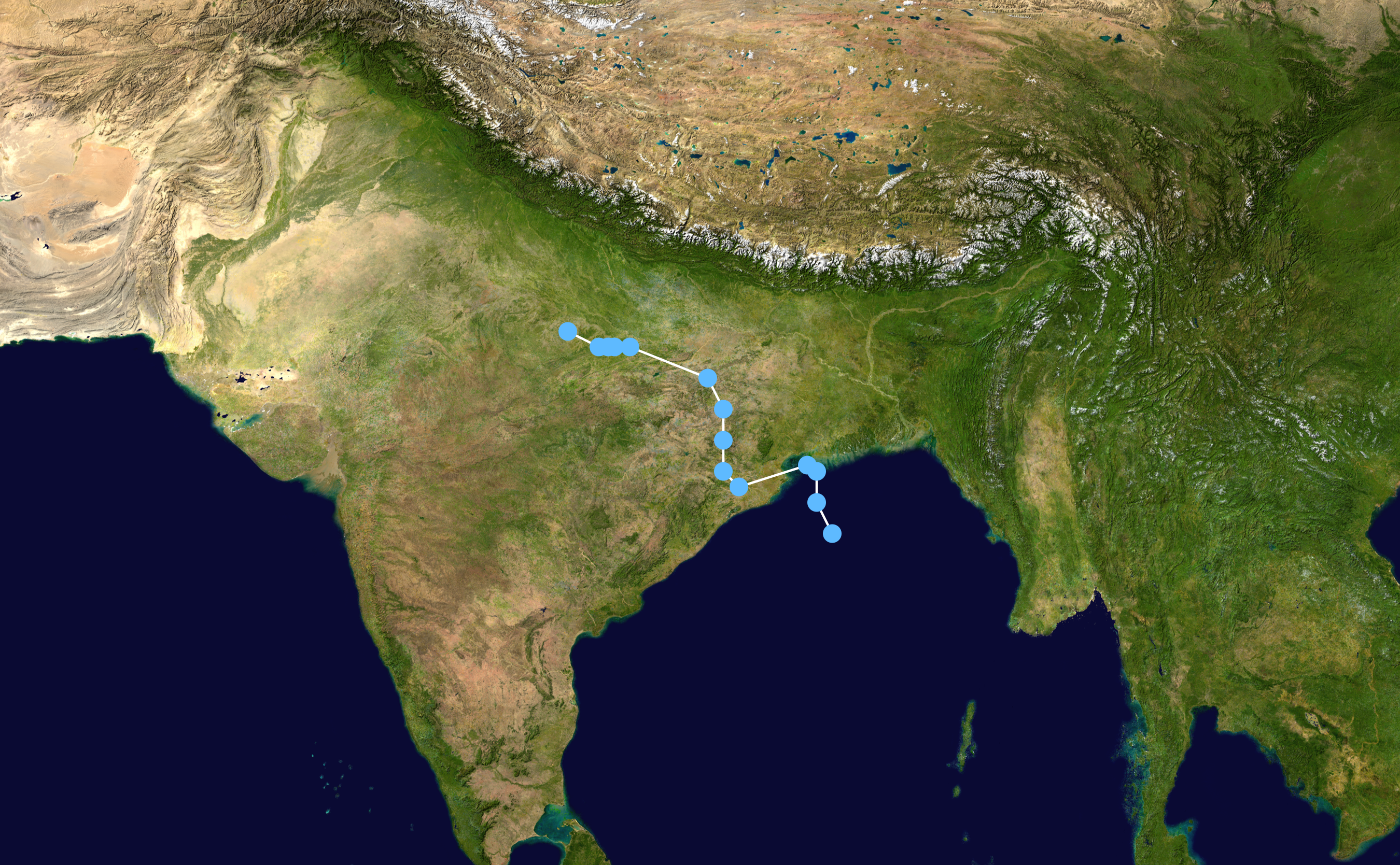
- Duration: August 27 – September 2
- Peak intensity: 45 km/h (30 mph) (3-min);

=== Depression BOB 07 ===
- Depression (IMD)
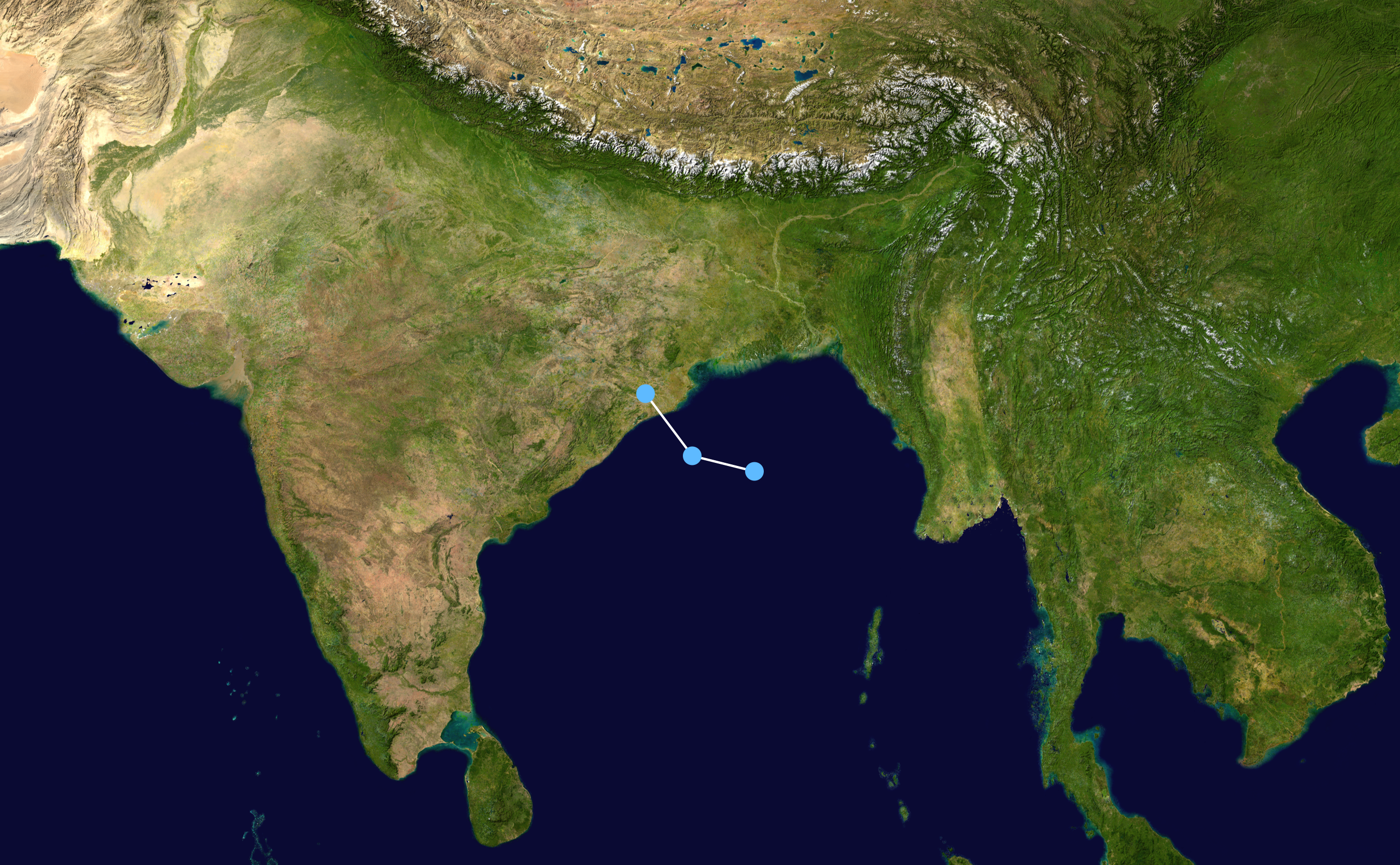
- Duration: September 9 – September 10
- Peak intensity: 45 km/h (30 mph) (3-min);

=== Deep Depression BOB 08 ===
- Deep depression (IMD)
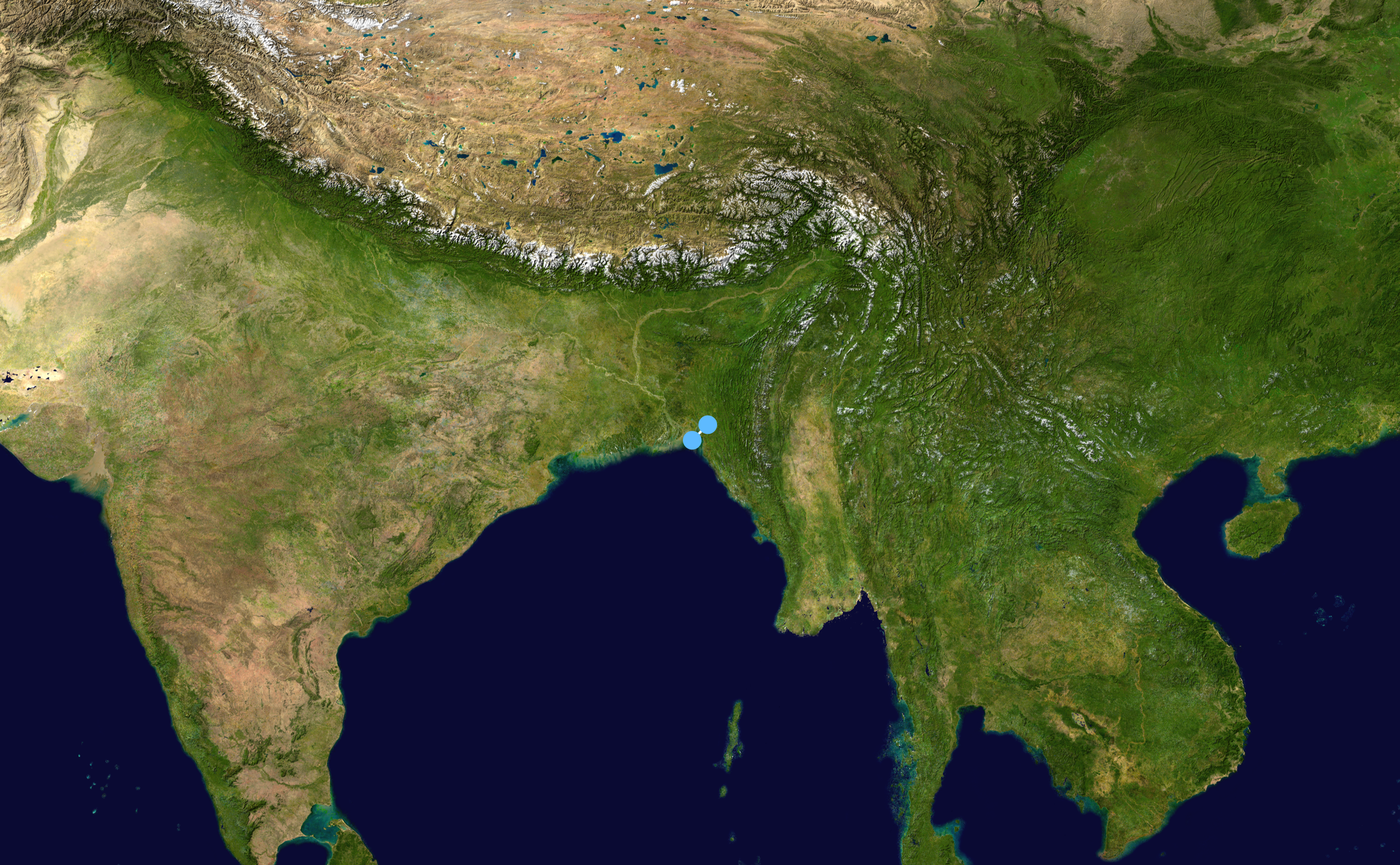
- Duration: September 29 – September 29
- Peak intensity: 55 km/h (35 mph) (3-min);

=== Deep Depression ARB 02 ===
- Deep depression (IMD)
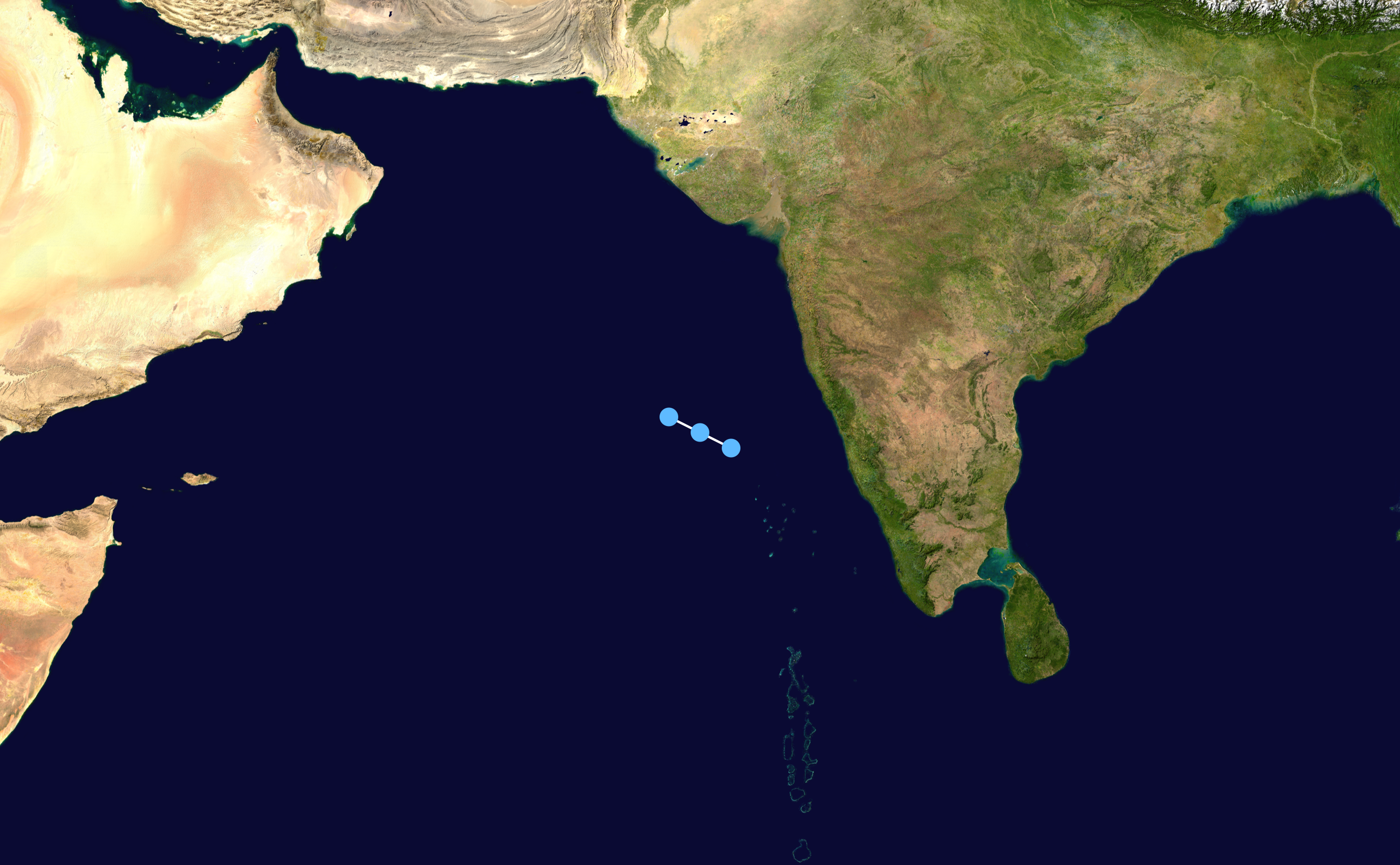
- Duration: October 1 – October 2
- Peak intensity: 55 km/h (35 mph) (3-min);

=== Severe Cyclonic Storm BOB 09 ===
- Severe cyclonic storm (IMD)
- Tropical storm (SSHWS)
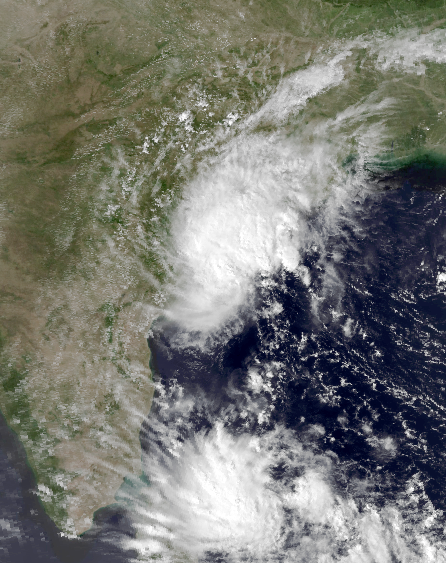
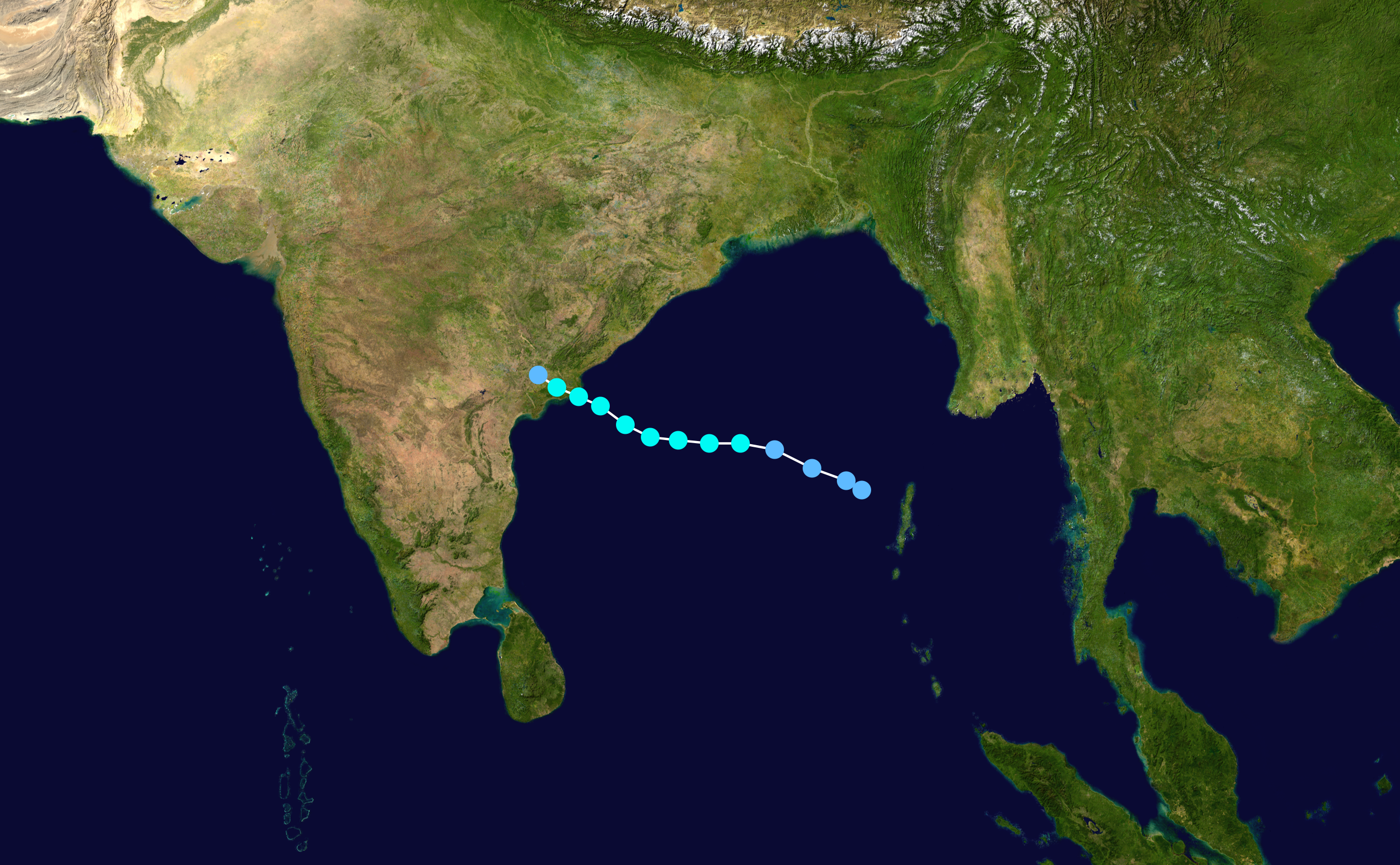
- Duration: October 11 – October 17
- Peak intensity: 100 km/h (65 mph) (3-min); 986 hPa (mbar)

Tropical Storm Three, which formed in the central Bay of Bengal on October 11, hit eastern India on the 16th as a 60 mph tropical storm. It brought considerable damages to Andhra Pradesh and Telangana.

=== Severe Cyclonic Storm BOB 10 ===
- Severe cyclonic storm (IMD)
- Tropical storm (SSHWS)
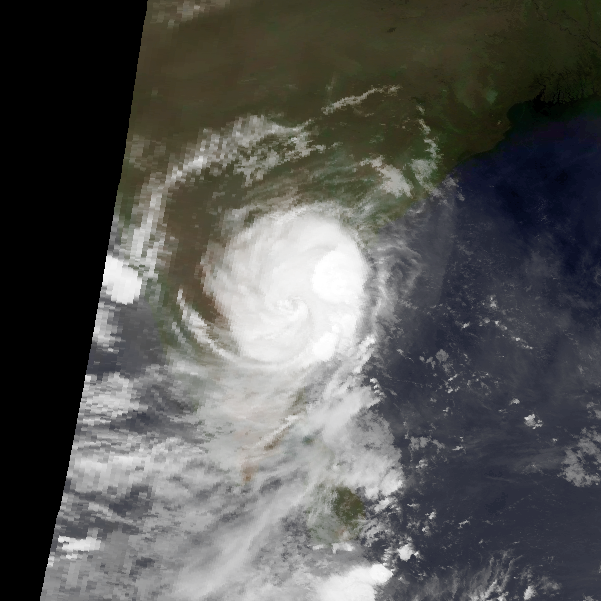
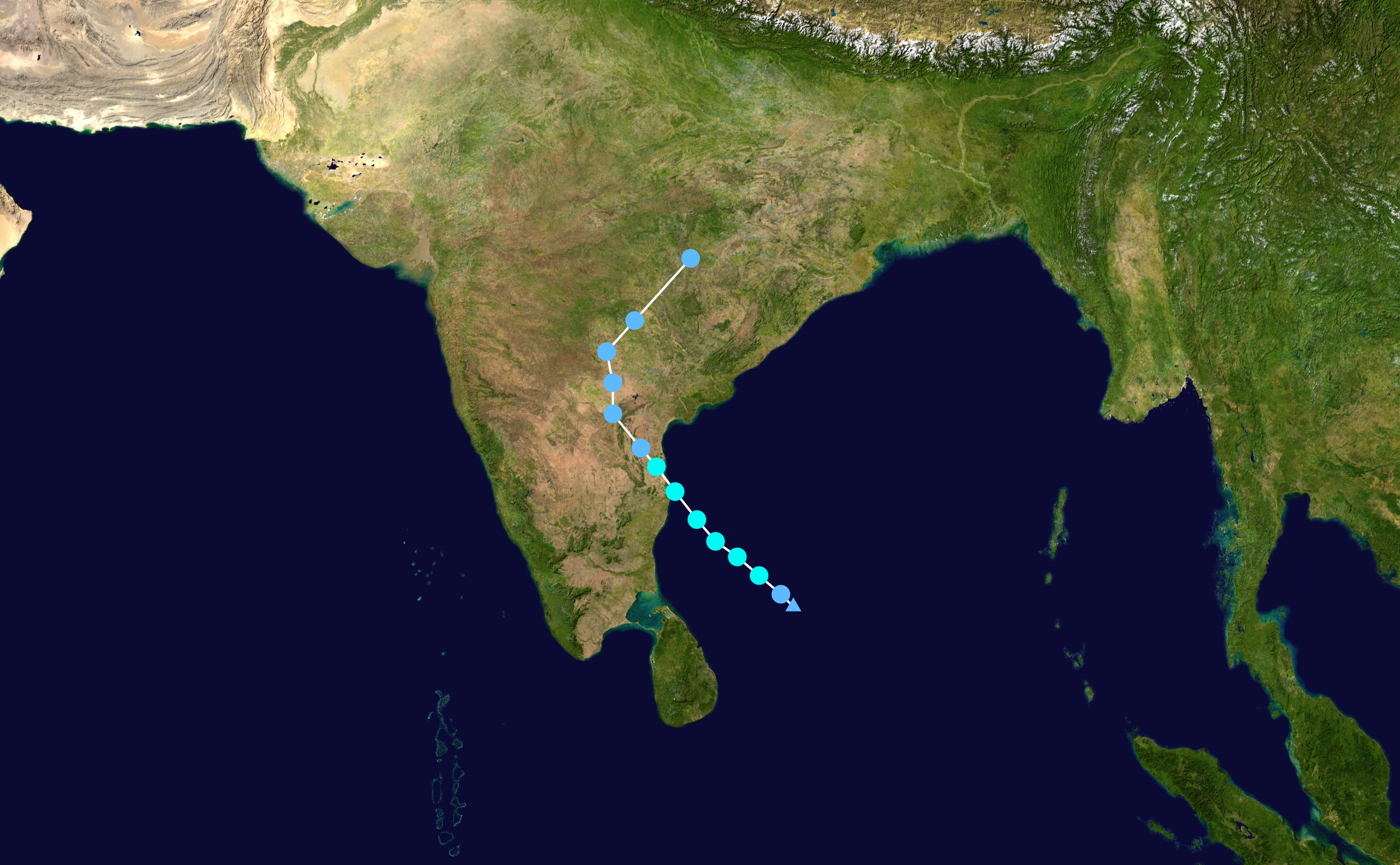
- Duration: October 16 – October 21
- Peak intensity: 100 km/h (65 mph) (3-min); 982 hPa (mbar)

An area of convection south of the previous storm slowly organized into a tropical storm on October 16. It tracked northwestward, reaching a peak of 60 mph winds before hitting southeastern India on the 20th as a weakened 50 mph storm. 60 fatalities can be attributed to this system and 400 huts were damaged.

=== Extremely Severe Cyclonic Storm ARB 03 ===
- Extremely severe cyclonic storm (IMD)
- Category 2 tropical cyclone (SSHWS)
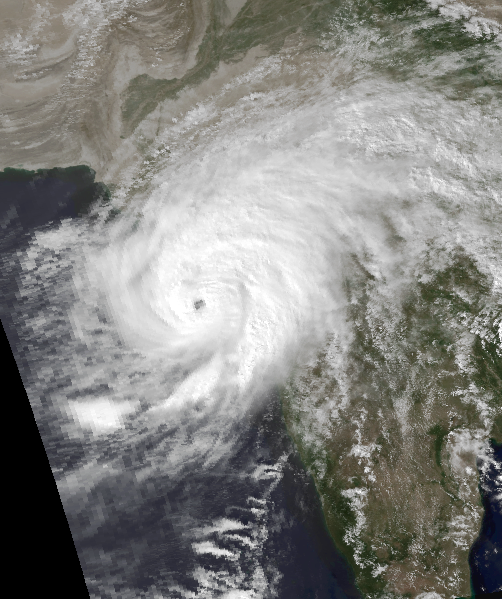
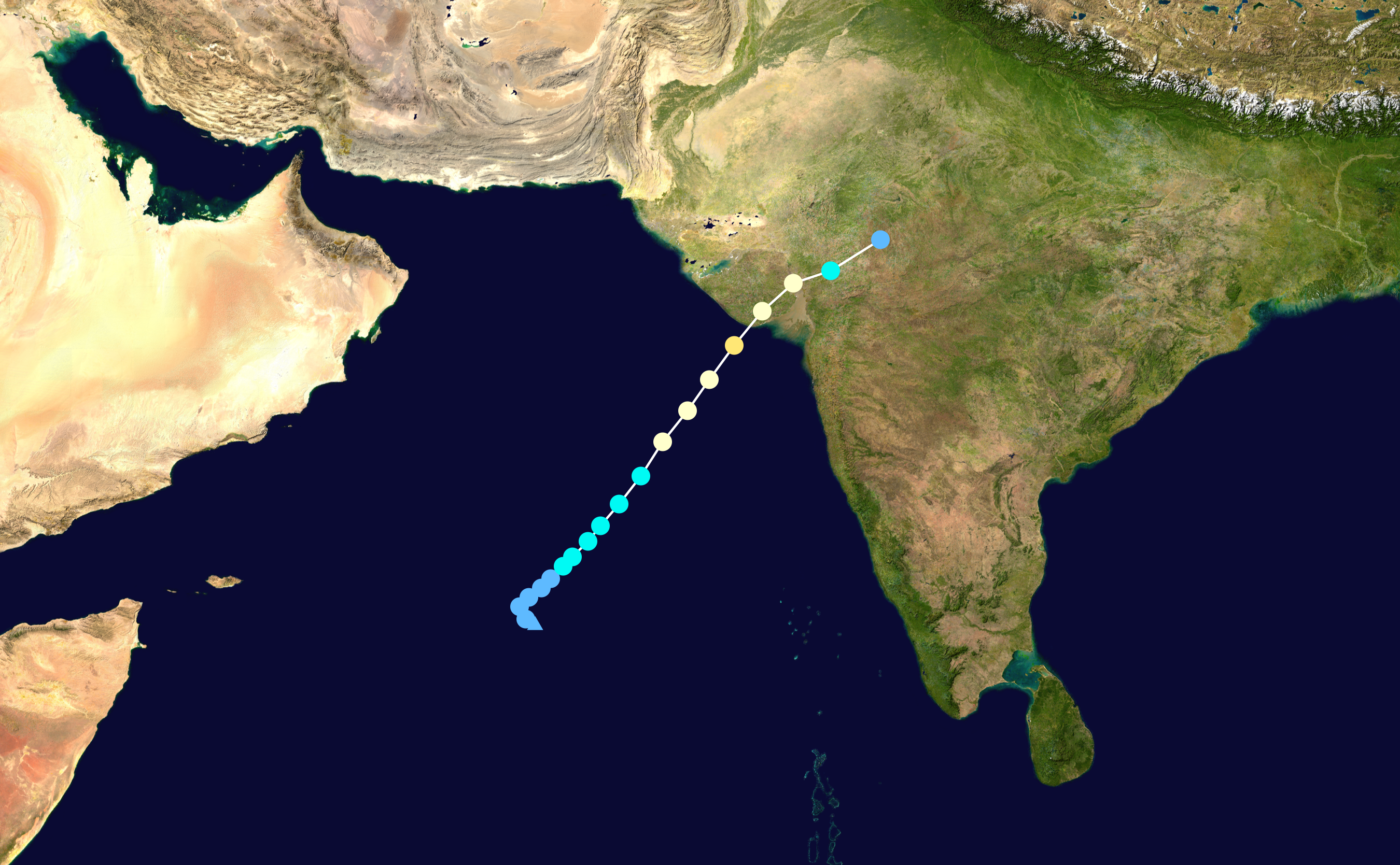
- Duration: November 4 – November 9
- Peak intensity: 165 km/h (105 mph) (3-min); 962 hPa (mbar)

The final storm of the season developed on November 4 in the central Arabian Sea. It tracked northeastward, strengthening into a tropical storm on the 6th and a cyclone on the 7th. The system peaked at 100 mph winds before hitting Veraval, India on the 8th. The cyclone rapidly dissipated, after resulting in 511 fatalities and heavy flooding. Damages were estimated to be ₹128 crore (equivalent to ₹24 billion or US$250 million in 2023).

=== Deep Depression BOB 11 ===
- Deep depression (IMD)
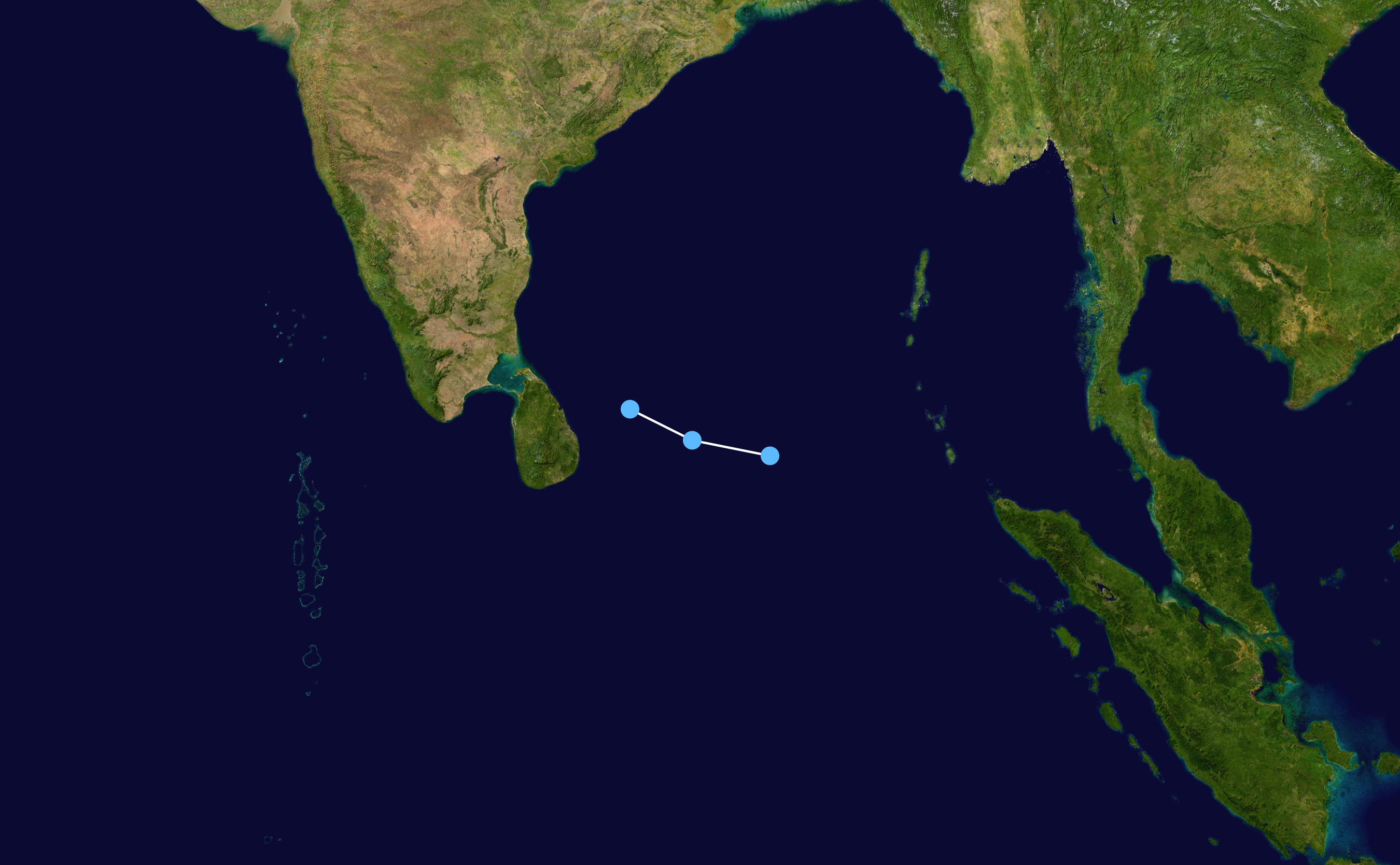
- Duration: November 28 – November 29
- Peak intensity: 55 km/h (35 mph) (3-min);

=== Deep Depression ARB 04 ===
- Deep depression (IMD)
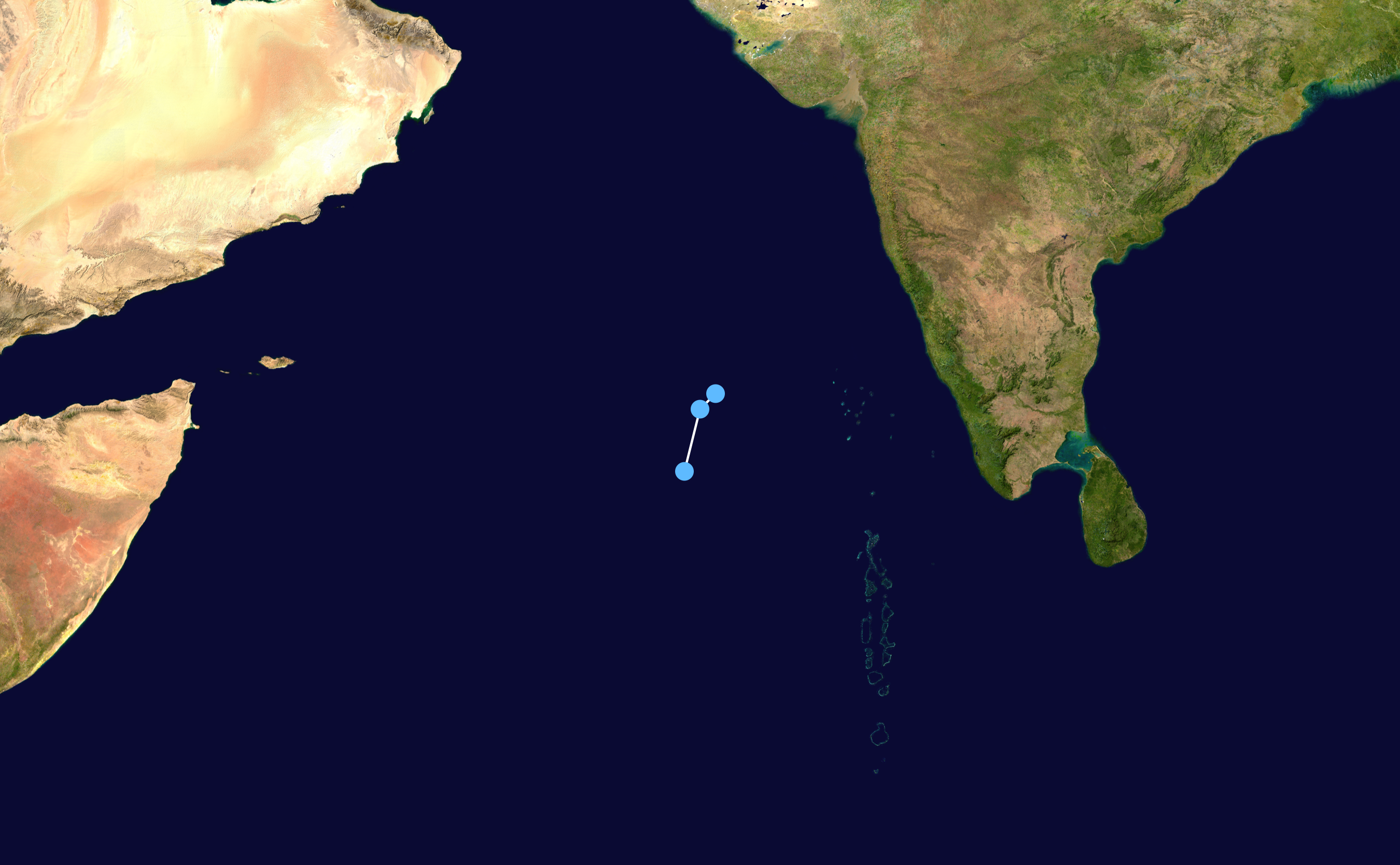
- Duration: November 28 – November 29
- Peak intensity: 55 km/h (35 mph) (3-min);

=== Depression BOB 12 ===
- Depression (IMD)
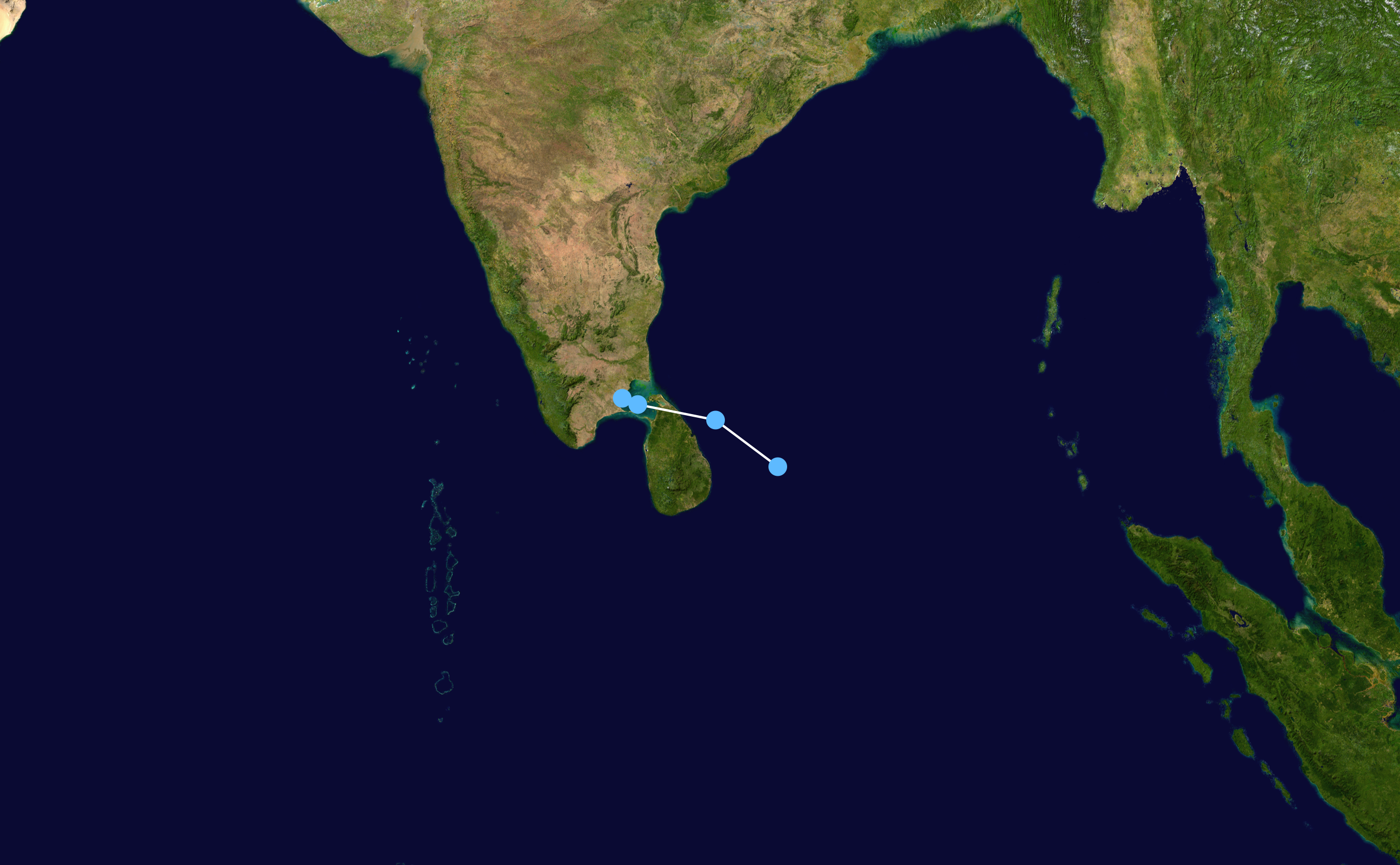
- Duration: December 2 – December 4
- Peak intensity: 45 km/h (30 mph) (3-min);

== See also ==
- North Indian Ocean tropical cyclone
- 1983 Atlantic hurricane season
- 1983 Pacific hurricane season
- 1983 Pacific typhoon season
- Australian cyclone seasons: 1981–82, 1982–83
- South Pacific cyclone seasons: 1981–82, 1982–83
- South-West Indian Ocean cyclone seasons: 1981–82, 1982–83
