= 49th meridian =

49th meridian may refer to:

- 49th meridian east, a line of longitude east of the Greenwich Meridian
- 49th meridian west, a line of longitude west of the Greenwich Meridian
