= 134th Division =

In military terms, 134th Division or 134th Infantry Division may refer to:

== Infantry Divisions ==
- 134th Infantry Division (Wehrmacht), Germany
- 134th Division (Imperial Japanese Army)
- 134th Motor Rifle Division, Soviet Union
- 134th Rifle Division, Red Army, Soviet Union

== Armoured Divisions ==
- 134th Armored Division "Emanuele Filiberto Testa di Ferro", Kingdom of Italy

== See also ==
- List of military divisions by number
- 134th Regiment (disambiguation)
- 134th (disambiguation)
