= 133rd Division =

133rd Division or 133rd Infantry Division may refer to the following military units:

== Infantry divisions ==
- 133rd Division (2nd Formation) (People's Republic of China), 1979–1985
- 133rd Fortress Division, Germany
- 133rd Division (Imperial Japanese Army)
- 133rd Rifle Division, Soviet Union

== Armoured divisions ==
- 133rd Armored Division "Littorio", Royal Italian Army, World War II

== See also ==
- List of military divisions by number
- 133rd Brigade (disambiguation)
- 133rd Regiment (disambiguation)
- 133rd Squadron (disambiguation)
- 133rd (disambiguation)
