= 45th meridian east =

Line of longitude

45th meridian east

The meridian 45° east of Greenwich is a line of longitude that extends from the North Pole across the Arctic Ocean, Europe, Asia, Africa, the Indian Ocean, the Southern Ocean, and Antarctica to the South Pole.

The 45th meridian east forms a great circle with the 135th meridian west. The meridian is the mid point of the Moscow Time.

== From Pole to Pole ==
Starting at the North Pole and heading south to the South Pole, the 45th meridian east passes through:

Co-ordinates	Country, territory or sea	Notes
90°0′N 45°0′E	Arctic Ocean	
80°37′N 45°0′E	Russia	Island of Alexandra Land
80°35′N 45°0′E	Barents Sea	
68°32′N 45°0′E	Russia	Kanin Peninsula
67°30′N 45°0′E	Barents Sea	Chesha Bay
67°18′N 45°0′E	Russia	Passing through Penza
42°43′N 45°0′E	Georgia	Passing through Tbilisi
41°18′N 45°0′E	Armenia	
41°3′N 45°0′E	Azerbaijan	Yukhari Askipara exclave surrounded by Armenia
41°0′N 45°0′E	Armenia	Passing through Lake Sevan
39°44′N 45°0′E	Azerbaijan	Nakhchivan exclave
39°25′N 45°0′E	Iran	Passing just west of Urmia
36°45′N 45°0′E	Iraq	
29°10′N 45°0′E	Saudi Arabia	
17°24′N 45°0′E	Yemen	Passing just west of Aden (at 12°48′N 45°2′E)
12°46′N 45°0′E	Indian Ocean	Gulf of Aden
10°27′N 45°0′E	Somalia	Somaliland - passing just east of Berbera
8°40′N 45°0′E	Ethiopia	
4°56′N 45°0′E	Somalia	
1°51′N 45°0′E	Indian Ocean	Passing just west of Mayotte, an overseas department of France
16°8′S 45°0′E	Madagascar	
25°30′S 45°0′E	Indian Ocean	
60°0′S 45°0′E	Southern Ocean	
67°46′S 45°0′E	Antarctica	Australian Antarctic Territory, claimed by Australia

== See also ==
- 44th meridian east
- 46th meridian east
