= 46th meridian east =

Line of longitude

46th meridian east

The meridian 46° east of Greenwich is a line of longitude that extends from the North Pole across the Arctic Ocean, Europe, Asia, Africa, the Indian Ocean, the Southern Ocean, and Antarctica to the South Pole.

The 46th meridian east forms a great circle with the 134th meridian west.

== From Pole to Pole ==
Starting at the North Pole and heading south to the South Pole, the 46th meridian east passes through:

Co-ordinates	Country, territory or sea	Notes
90°0′N 46°0′E	Arctic Ocean	
80°39′N 46°0′E	Russia	Island of Alexandra Land, Franz Josef Land
80°33′N 46°0′E	Barents Sea	
68°21′N 46°0′E	Russia	Kanin Peninsula
67°47′N 46°0′E	Barents Sea	Chesha Bay
66°51′N 46°0′E	Russia	
51°30′N 46°0′E	Russia	Saratov
42°2′N 46°0′E	Georgia	
41°11′N 46°0′E	Azerbaijan	
39°46′N 46°0′E	Armenia	
39°12′N 46°0′E	Azerbaijan	Nakhchivan exclave
38°52′N 46°0′E	Iran	
35°50′N 46°0′E	Iraq	
35°34′N 46°0′E	Iran	For about 3 km
35°33′N 46°0′E	Iraq	For about 4 km
35°31′N 46°0′E	Iran	For about 3 km
35°29′N 46°0′E	Iraq	
35°4′N 46°0′E	Iran	
33°29′N 46°0′E	Iraq	
29°6′N 46°0′E	Saudi Arabia	
17°14′N 46°0′E	Yemen	
13°25′N 46°0′E	Indian Ocean	Gulf of Aden
10°47′N 46°0′E	Somalia	Somaliland
8°20′N 46°0′E	Ethiopia	
5°58′N 46°0′E	Somalia	
2°25′N 46°0′E	Indian Ocean	Passing just west of Aldabra atoll, Seychelles
15°51′S 46°0′E	Madagascar	
25°18′S 46°0′E	Indian Ocean	
60°0′S 46°0′E	Southern Ocean	
67°39′S 46°0′E	Antarctica	Australian Antarctic Territory, claimed by Australia

== History ==
According to Douglas Jardine, during World War 1, a line from Badwein to the 46th meridian was drawn "to afford protection to the friendly tribes on our side". (Note: Badwein, a confluence along this line, was also the burial site of Said Saleh Harti Dhulbahante, progenitor of the Dhulbahante tribe)

== See also ==
- 45th meridian east
- 47th meridian east
