= 133rd Division (2nd Formation) (People's Republic of China) =

Independent Division of Guangxi Military District (1979–82) 133rd Army Division(1982-85)
- Active: 1979.4 - 1985.10
- Country: People's Republic of China
- Branch: People's Liberation Army
- Type: Division
- Role: Infantry
- Part of: Guangxi Military District

Independent Division of Guangxi Military District(Chinese: 广西军区独立师)(2nd Formation) was formed in April 1979 by 41st Army Corps in Chongzuo, Guangxi. The division was under the control of Guangxi Military District.

In September 1982 the division was renamed as 133rd Army Division(Chinese: 陆军第133师). All its regiments were renamed as follows:

- 397th Infantry Regiment (former 1st Regiment);
- 398th Infantry Regiment (former 2nd Regiment);
- 399th Infantry Regiment (former 3rd Regiment);
- Artillery Regiment.

The division had an independent tank battalion in its formation.

In October 1985 the division was disbanded.
