= 47th meridian west =

Line of longitude

47th meridian west

The meridian 47° west of Greenwich is a line of longitude that extends from the North Pole across the Arctic Ocean, Greenland, the Atlantic Ocean, South America, the Southern Ocean, and Antarctica to the South Pole.

The 47th meridian west forms a great circle with the 133rd meridian east.

== From Pole to Pole ==
Starting at the North Pole and heading south to the South Pole, the 47th meridian west passes through:

Co-ordinates	Country, territory or sea	Notes
90°0′N 47°0′W	Arctic Ocean	
83°41′N 47°0′W	Lincoln Sea	
82°55′N 47°0′W	Greenland	Elison Island
82°52′N 47°0′W	Arctic Ocean	
82°39′N 47°0′W	Greenland	Island of Nares Land
82°23′N 47°0′W	Victoria Fjord	
82°9′N 47°0′W	Greenland	Wulff Land
60°45′N 47°0′W	Atlantic Ocean	
0°45′S 47°0′W	Brazil	Pará; Maranhão — from 3°32′S 47°0′W; Tocantins — from 8°3′S 47°0′W; Maranhão — for about 16 km from 8°55′S 47°0′W; Tocantins — from 9°3′S 47°0′W; Goiás — from 13°5′S 47°0′W; Minas Gerais — from 15°56′S 47°0′W; São Paulo — from 21°20′S 47°0′W, passing just east of Campinas at 22°54′S 47°3′W
24°20′S 47°0′W	Atlantic Ocean	
60°0′S 47°0′W	Southern Ocean	
77°46′S 47°0′W	Antarctica	Claimed by both Argentina (Argentine Antarctica) and United Kingdom (British Antarctic Territory)

== See also ==
- 46th meridian west
- 48th meridian west
