= 46th meridian west =

Line of longitude

46th meridian west

The meridian 46° west of Greenwich is a line of longitude that extends from the North Pole across the Arctic Ocean, Greenland, the Atlantic Ocean, South America, the Southern Ocean, and Antarctica to the South Pole.

The 46th meridian west forms a great ellipse with the 134th meridian east.

== From Pole to Pole ==
Starting at the North Pole and heading south to the South Pole, the 46th meridian west passes through:

Co-ordinates	Country, territory or sea	Notes
90°0′N 46°0′W	Arctic Ocean	
83°41′N 46°0′W	Lincoln Sea	
83°6′N 46°0′W	Greenland	Sverdrup Island
82°51′N 46°0′W	Lincoln Sea	
82°38′N 46°0′W	Greenland	Island of Nares Land
82°15′N 46°0′W	Victoria Fjord	
81°59′N 46°0′W	Greenland	Wulff Land
60°33′N 46°0′W	Atlantic Ocean	
1°7′S 46°0′W	Brazil	Maranhão; Tocantins — from 10°18′S 46°0′W; Bahia — from 10°32′S 46°0′W; Goiás — from 14°18′S 46°0′W; Bahia — for about 16 km from 14°48′S 46°0′W; Minas Gerais — for about 9 km from 14°57′S 46°0′W; Bahia — for about 9 km from 15°2′S 46°0′W; Minas Gerais — from 15°12′S 46°0′W; São Paulo — from 22°52′S 46°0′W, passing just west of São José dos Campos at 23°11′S 45°52′W
23°48′S 46°0′W	Atlantic Ocean	
60°0′S 46°0′W	Southern Ocean	
60°34′S 46°0′W	South Orkney Islands	Coronation Island — claimed by both Argentina (Tierra del Fuego Province) and United Kingdom (British Antarctic Territory)
60°38′S 46°0′W	Southern Ocean	
77°56′S 46°0′W	Antarctica	Claimed by both Argentina (Argentine Antarctica) and United Kingdom (British Antarctic Territory)

== See also ==
- 45th meridian west
- 47th meridian west
- Treaty of Tordesillas
