= 49th meridian east =

Line of longitude

49th meridian east

The meridian 49° east of Greenwich is a line of longitude that extends from the North Pole across the Arctic Ocean, Europe, Asia, Africa, the Indian Ocean, Madagascar, the Southern Ocean, and Antarctica to the South Pole.

The 49th meridian east forms a great circle with the 131st meridian west.

== From Pole to Pole ==
Starting at the North Pole and heading south to the South Pole, the 49th meridian east passes through:

Co-ordinates	Country, territory or sea	Notes
90°0′N 49°0′E	Arctic Ocean	
80°31′N 49°0′E	Russia	Island of Zemlya Georga, Franz Josef Land
80°22′N 49°0′E	Barents Sea	Nightingale Channel
80°12′N 49°0′E	Russia	Island of Zemlya Georga, Franz Josef Land
80°10′N 49°0′E	Barents Sea	
69°30′N 49°0′E	Russia	Kolguyev island
68°44′N 49°0′E	Barents Sea	
67°50′N 49°0′E	Russia	Passing just west of Kazan
50°43′N 49°0′E	Kazakhstan	
46°25′N 49°0′E	Russia	
46°8′N 49°0′E	Caspian Sea	
41°27′N 49°0′E	Azerbaijan	
39°11′N 49°0′E	Caspian Sea	
37°44′N 49°0′E	Iran	
30°20′N 49°0′E	Persian Gulf	
27°36′N 49°0′E	Saudi Arabia	
18°29′N 49°0′E	Yemen	
14°19′N 49°0′E	Indian Ocean	Gulf of Aden
11°15′N 49°0′E	Somalia	
6°4′N 49°0′E	Indian Ocean	
12°19′S 49°0′E	Madagascar	
19°14′S 49°0′E	Indian Ocean	
60°0′S 49°0′E	Southern Ocean	Passing just east of White Island, Antarctica
66°54′S 49°0′E	Antarctica	Australian Antarctic Territory, claimed by Australia

== See also ==
- 48th meridian east
- 50th meridian east
