= 135th meridian west =

Line of longitude

135th meridian west

The meridian 135° west of Greenwich is a line of longitude that extends from the North Pole across the Arctic Ocean, North America, the Pacific Ocean, the Southern Ocean, and Antarctica to the South Pole.

The 135th meridian west forms a great circle with the 45th meridian east.

The Alaska Time Zone is based on the mean solar time of this meridian.

== From Pole to Pole ==
Starting at the North Pole and heading south to the South Pole, the 135th meridian west passes through:

Co-ordinates	Country, territory or sea	Notes
90°0′N 135°0′W	Arctic Ocean	
74°33′N 135°0′W	Beaufort Sea	
69°28′N 135°0′W	Canada	Northwest Territories — Richards Island and mainland, passing through Aklavik; Yukon — from 67°0′N 135°0′W (passing just east of Whitehorse at 60°43′N 135°3′W); British Columbia — from 60°0′N 135°0′W
59°19′N 135°0′W	United States	Alaska — Alaska Panhandle (mainland)
58°47′N 135°0′W	Lynn Canal	
58°31′N 135°0′W	United States	Alaska — Lincoln Island
58°29′N 135°0′W	Lynn Canal	Passing just west of Admiralty Island, Alaska, United States (at 58°21′N 134°57′W)
58°3′N 135°0′W	United States	Alaska — Chichagof Island and Baranof Island
56°29′N 135°0′W	Pacific Ocean	
23°6′S 135°0′W	French Polynesia	Island of Mangareva
23°7′S 135°0′W	Pacific Ocean	
60°0′S 135°0′W	Southern Ocean	
74°31′S 135°0′W	Antarctica	Unclaimed territory

== See also ==
- 134th meridian west
- 136th meridian west
