= 47th meridian east =

Line of longitude

47th meridian east

The meridian 47° east of Greenwich is a line of longitude that extends from the North Pole across the Arctic Ocean, Europe, Asia, Africa, the Indian Ocean, the Southern Ocean, and Antarctica to the South Pole.

The 47th meridian east forms a great circle with the 133rd meridian west.

== From Pole to Pole ==
Starting at the North Pole and heading south to the South Pole, the 47th meridian east passes through:

Co-ordinates	Country, territory or sea	Notes
90°0′N 47°0′E	Arctic Ocean	
80°46′N 47°0′E	Russia	Island of Alexandra Land, Franz Josef Land
80°35′N 47°0′E	Barents Sea	Cambridge Channel
80°21′N 47°0′E	Russia	Island of Zemlya Georga, Franz Josef Land
80°10′N 47°0′E	Barents Sea	
66°51′N 47°0′E	Russia	
49°52′N 47°0′E	Kazakhstan	
49°13′N 47°0′E	Russia	For about 18km
49°3′N 47°0′E	Kazakhstan	
48°16′N 47°0′E	Russia	
44°48′N 47°0′E	Caspian Sea	Kizlyar Bay
44°21′N 47°0′E	Russia	
41°34′N 47°0′E	Azerbaijan	Passing through Nagorno-Karabakh
39°10′N 47°0′E	Iran	
32°34′N 47°0′E	Iraq	
29°41′N 47°0′E	Kuwait	
29°3′N 47°0′E	Saudi Arabia	Passing just east of Riyadh
16°55′N 47°0′E	Yemen	
13°33′N 47°0′E	Indian Ocean	Gulf of Aden
10°56′N 47°0′E	Somalia	Somaliland
8°0′N 47°0′E	Ethiopia	
6°59′N 47°0′E	Somalia	
3°26′N 47°0′E	Indian Ocean	Passing just west of the Glorioso Islands atoll, French Southern and Antarctic Lands
15°18′S 47°0′E	Madagascar	
25°2′S 47°0′E	Indian Ocean	
60°0′S 47°0′E	Southern Ocean	
67°17′S 47°0′E	Antarctica	Australian Antarctic Territory, claimed by Australia

== See also ==
- 46th meridian east
- 48th meridian east
