= 134th Motor Rifle Division =

Motor rifle division of the Soviet military

134th Motorized Rifle Division
- Active: 1980–1989
- Country: Soviet Union
- Branch: Soviet Army
- Type: Motorized infantry
- Garrison/HQ: Dushanbe

The 134th Motorized Rifle Division was a motorized infantry division of the Soviet Army. It existed between 1980 and 1989 and was based in Dushanbe.

== History ==
The 134th Motorized Rifle Division was activated in February 1980 in Dushanbe, subordinated to the Central Asian Military District's 17th Army Corps. It replaced the 201st Motorized Rifle Division, which had been transferred to Afghanistan. During the Cold War, it was maintained at 15% strength. In February 1989, it was disbanded and absorbed by the 201st Motor Rifle Division.

== Composition ==
In 1988, the division was composed of the following units. All units were based at Dushanbe unless noted.

- 92nd Motorized Rifle Regiment
- 806th Motorized Rifle Regiment (Kurgan-Tyube)
- 1208th Motorized Rifle Regiment (Kulyab)
- 401st Tank Regiment
- Artillery Regiment
- 990th Anti-Aircraft Artillery Regiment
- 837th Separate Missile Battalion (Kurgan-Tyube)
- Separate Anti-Tank Artillery Battalion
- Separate Reconnaissance Battalion
- Separate Engineer-Sapper Battalion
- Separate Communications Battalion
- Separate Chemical Defence Company
- Separate Equipment Maintenance and Recovery Battalion
- Separate Medical Battalion
- Separate Material Supply Battalion
