= 48th meridian east =

Line of longitude

48th meridian east

The meridian 48° east of Greenwich is a line of longitude that extends from the North Pole across the Arctic Ocean, Europe, Asia, Africa, the Indian Ocean, Madagascar, the Southern Ocean, and Antarctica to the South Pole.

The 48th meridian east forms a great circle with the 132nd meridian west.

== From Pole to Pole ==
Starting at the North Pole and heading south to the South Pole, the 48th meridian east passes through:

Co-ordinates	Country, territory or sea	Notes
90°0′N 48°0′E	Arctic Ocean	
80°48′N 48°0′E	Russia	Island of Alexandra Land, Franz Josef Land
80°43′N 48°0′E	Barents Sea	Cambridge Channel
80°32′N 48°0′E	Russia	Island of Zemlya Georga, Franz Josef Land
80°4′N 48°0′E	Barents Sea	Passing just west of the island of Kolguyev, Russia
67°38′N 48°0′E	Russia	
50°9′N 48°0′E	Kazakhstan	
47°46′N 48°0′E	Russia	Passes through the center of the city of Astrakhan, Russia
45°42′N 48°0′E	Caspian Sea	
42°24′N 48°0′E	Russia	
41°24′N 48°0′E	Azerbaijan	
39°41′N 48°0′E	Iran	
31°0′N 48°0′E	Iraq	The meridian runs parallel to the border with Iran, which is about 3km to the east
30°0′N 48°0′E	Kuwait	
29°34′N 48°0′E	Persian Gulf	Kuwait Bay
29°23′N 48°0′E	Kuwait	Passing through Kuwait City
28°32′N 48°0′E	Saudi Arabia	
17°51′N 48°0′E	Yemen	
14°3′N 48°0′E	Indian Ocean	Gulf of Aden
11°7′N 48°0′E	Somalia	
4°31′N 48°0′E	Indian Ocean	Passing just east of Astove Island, Seychelles
13°32′S 48°0′E	Madagascar	
22°12′S 48°0′E	Indian Ocean	
60°0′S 48°0′E	Southern Ocean	
67°17′S 48°0′E	Antarctica	Australian Antarctic Territory, claimed by Australia

== See also ==
- 47th meridian east
- 49th meridian east
