= 132nd meridian west =

Line of longitude

132nd meridian west

The meridian 132° west of Greenwich is a line of longitude that extends from the North Pole across the Arctic Ocean, North America, the Pacific Ocean, the Southern Ocean, and Antarctica to the South Pole.

The 132nd meridian west forms a great circle with the 48th meridian east.

== From Pole to Pole ==
Starting at the North Pole and heading south to the South Pole, the 132nd meridian west passes through:

Co-ordinates	Country, territory or sea	Notes
90°0′N 132°0′W	Arctic Ocean	
74°59′N 132°0′W	Beaufort Sea	
69°44′N 132°0′W	Canada	Northwest Territories; Yukon — from 64°39′N 132°0′W; British Columbia — from 60°0′N 132°0′W
56°51′N 132°0′W	United States	Alaska — Alaska Panhandle (mainland), Wrangell Island, Deer Island and Cleveland Peninsula (mainland)
55°30′N 132°0′W	Clarence Strait	
55°16′N 132°0′W	United States	Alaska — Prince of Wales Island
54°43′N 132°0′W	Dixon Entrance	
54°2′N 132°0′W	Canada	British Columbia — Graham Island and Moresby Island
52°40′N 132°0′W	Pacific Ocean	
60°0′S 132°0′W	Southern Ocean	
74°19′S 132°0′W	Antarctica	Unclaimed territory

== See also ==
- 131st meridian west
- 133rd meridian west
