= Chosha Bay =

Inlet of the Barents Sea

Coordinates: 67°30′N 46°30′E

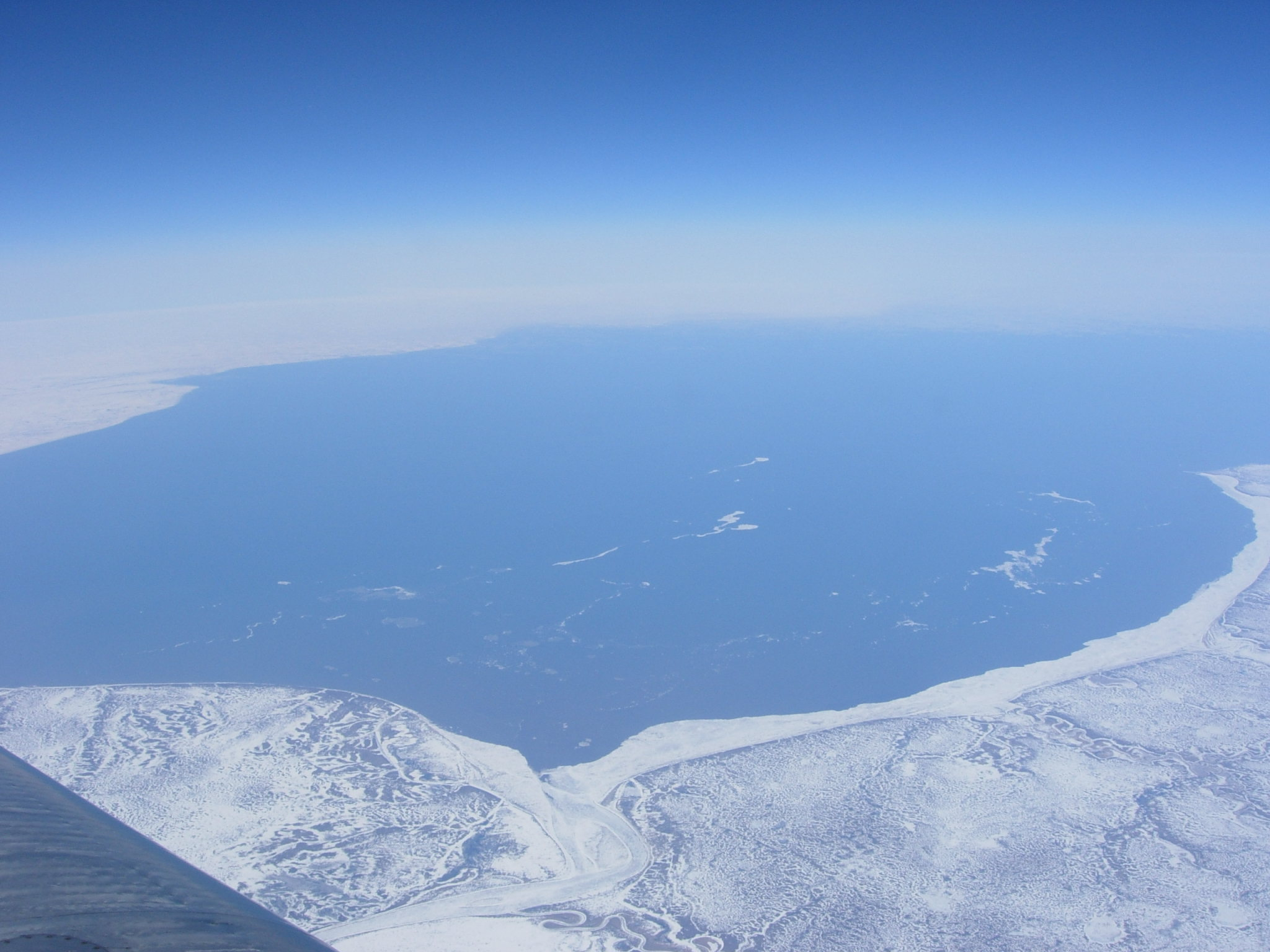
Chosha Bay

Chosha Bay (Choshskaya Guba, Russian: Чёшская губа) is an inlet of the Barents Sea, 84 miles (135 km) wide and 62 miles (100 km) long, lies between the East shore of Kanin peninsula and the mainland of northern European Russia.
