= 134th (Loyal Limerick) Regiment of Foot =

Infantry regiment of the British Army

The 134th (Loyal Limerick) Regiment of Foot was an infantry regiment of the British Army, created in 1794 and disbanded in 1796. The regiment was formed in Ireland by redesignating the newly raised 2nd Battalion of the 83rd (County of Dublin) Regiment of Foot, and did not leave Ireland before being disbanded in 1796.
