= 133rd meridian west =

Line of longitude

133rd meridian west

The meridian 133° west of Greenwich is a line of longitude that extends from the North Pole across the Arctic Ocean, North America, the Pacific Ocean, the Southern Ocean, and Antarctica to the South Pole.

The 133rd meridian west forms a great circle with the 47th meridian east.

== From Pole to Pole ==
Starting at the North Pole and heading south to the South Pole, the 133rd meridian west passes through:

Co-ordinates	Country, territory or sea	Notes
90°0′N 133°0′W	Arctic Ocean	
74°50′N 133°0′W	Beaufort Sea	
69°36′N 133°0′W	Canada	Northwest Territories — passing through Tuktoyaktuk; Yukon — from 66°1′N 133°0′W; British Columbia — from 60°0′N 133°0′W
57°57′N 133°0′W	United States	Alaska — Alaska Panhandle (mainland), Kupreanof Island, Woewodski Island, Zarembo Island, Thorne Island, Prince of Wales Island and Dall Island
54°50′N 133°0′W	Pacific Ocean	
54°15′N 133°0′W	Canada	British Columbia — Langara Island, Graham Island and Hippa Island
53°32′N 133°0′W	Pacific Ocean	
60°0′S 133°0′W	Southern Ocean	
74°24′S 133°0′W	Antarctica	Unclaimed territory

== See also ==
- 132nd meridian west
- 134th meridian west
