= 133rd meridian east =

Line of longitude

133rd meridian east (interactive map)

The meridian 133° east of Greenwich is a line of longitude extending from the North Pole across the Arctic Ocean, Asia, Australia, the Indian Ocean, the Southern Ocean, and Antarctica to the South Pole.

The 133rd meridian east forms a great circle with the 47th meridian west.

== From Pole to Pole ==
Starting at the North Pole and heading south to the South Pole, the 133rd meridian east passes through:

Co-ordinates	Country, territory or sea	Notes
90°0′N 133°0′E	Arctic Ocean	
76°53′N 133°0′E	Laptev Sea	
71°58′N 133°0′E	Russia	Sakha Republic; Khabarovsk Krai — from 59°1′N 133°0′E; Amur Oblast — from 53°28′N 133°0′E; Khabarovsk Krai — from 55°22′N 133°0′E; Amur Oblast — from 53°20′N 133°0′E; Khabarovsk Krai — from 52°10′N 133°0′E; Jewish Autonomous Oblast — from 49°10′N 133°0′E
48°2′N 133°0′E	China	Heilongjiang
45°2′N 133°0′E	Russia	Primorsky Krai
42°48′N 133°0′E	Sea of Japan	
36°7′N 133°0′E	Japan	Island of Nishino, Shimane Prefecture
36°2′N 133°0′E	Sea of Japan	
35°32′N 133°0′E	Japan	Island of Honshū — Shimane Prefecture (passing through Lake Shinji) — Hiroshima Prefecture — from 35°5′N 133°0′E
34°19′N 133°0′E	Seto Inland Sea	
34°17′N 133°0′E	Japan	Island of Ōmi, Ehime Prefecture
34°11′N 133°0′E	Seto Inland Sea	
34°4′N 133°0′E	Japan	Island of Shikoku — Ehime Prefecture — Kōchi Prefecture — from 33°28′N 133°0′E
32°43′N 133°0′E	Pacific Ocean	
0°29′S 133°0′E	Indonesia	Island of New Guinea
2°16′S 133°0′E	Berau Bay	
2°33′S 133°0′E	Indonesia	Island of New Guinea
4°6′S 133°0′E	Arafura Sea	
5°39′S 133°0′E	Indonesia	Island of Kai Besar
5°42′S 133°0′E	Arafura Sea	
11°26′S 133°0′E	Australia	Northern Territory; South Australia — from 26°0′S 133°0′E
32°5′S 133°0′E	Indian Ocean	Australian authorities consider this to be part of the Southern Ocean
60°0′S 133°0′E	Southern Ocean	
66°10′S 133°0′E	Antarctica	Australian Antarctic Territory, claimed by Australia

== See also ==
- 132nd meridian east
- 134th meridian east
