= 134th meridian east =

Line of longitude

134th meridian east (interactive map)

The meridian 134° east of Greenwich is a line of longitude that extends from the North Pole across the Arctic Ocean, Asia, Australia, the Indian Ocean, the Southern Ocean, and Antarctica to the South Pole.

The 134th meridian east forms a great ellipse with the 46th meridian west.

== From Pole to Pole ==
Starting at the North Pole and heading south to the South Pole, the 134th meridian east passes through:

Co-ordinates	Country, territory or sea	Notes
90°0′N 134°0′E	Arctic Ocean	
76°47′N 134°0′E	Laptev Sea	
71°23′N 134°0′E	Russia	Sakha Republic; Khabarovsk Krai — from 59°21′N 134°0′E; Amur Oblast — from 53°23′N 134°0′E; Khabarovsk Krai — from 52°31′N 134°0′E; Jewish Autonomous Oblast — from 48°37′N 134°0′E
48°17′N 134°0′E	China	Heilongjiang
46°38′N 134°0′E	Russia	Primorsky Krai
42°56′N 134°0′E	Sea of Japan	
35°32′N 134°0′E	Japan	Island of Honshū — Tottori Prefecture — Okayama Prefecture — from 35°21′N 134°0′E; Island of Nao — Kagawa Prefecture — from 34°27′N 134°0′E
34°26′N 134°0′E	Seto Inland Sea	
34°21′N 134°0′E	Japan	Island of Shikoku — Kagawa Prefecture — Tokushima Prefecture — from 33°49′N 134°0′E — Kōchi Prefecture — from 33°49′N 134°0′E
33°25′N 134°0′E	Pacific Ocean	Passing just west of the island of Angaur, Palau (at 6°53′N 134°7′E)
0°44′S 134°0′E	Indonesia	Island of New Guinea
3°51′S 134°0′E	Arafura Sea	Passing just west of the Aru Islands, Indonesia (at 6°45′S 134°3′E)
11°52′S 134°0′E	Australia	Northern Territory; South Australia — from 26°0′S 134°0′E
32°29′S 134°0′E	Indian Ocean	Australian authorities consider this to be part of the Southern Ocean
60°0′S 134°0′E	Southern Ocean	
66°11′S 134°0′E	Antarctica	Australian Antarctic Territory, claimed by Australia

== See also ==
- 133rd meridian east
- 135th meridian east
