= 134th New York Infantry Regiment =

- Active: July 9, 1862 - June 10, 1865
- Country: United States
- Allegiance: Union
- Branch: Infantry
- Engagements: Battle of Chancellorsville; Battle of Gettysburg; Battle of Wauhatchie; Battle of Missionary Ridge; Atlanta campaign Battle of Resaca; Battle of Dallas; Battle of New Hope Church; Battle of Allatoona; Battle of Pine Hill; Battle of Marietta; Battle of Kolb's Farm; Battle of Kennesaw Mountain; Battle of Peachtree Creek; Siege of Atlanta; Sherman's March to the Sea; Carolinas campaign Battle of Bentonville

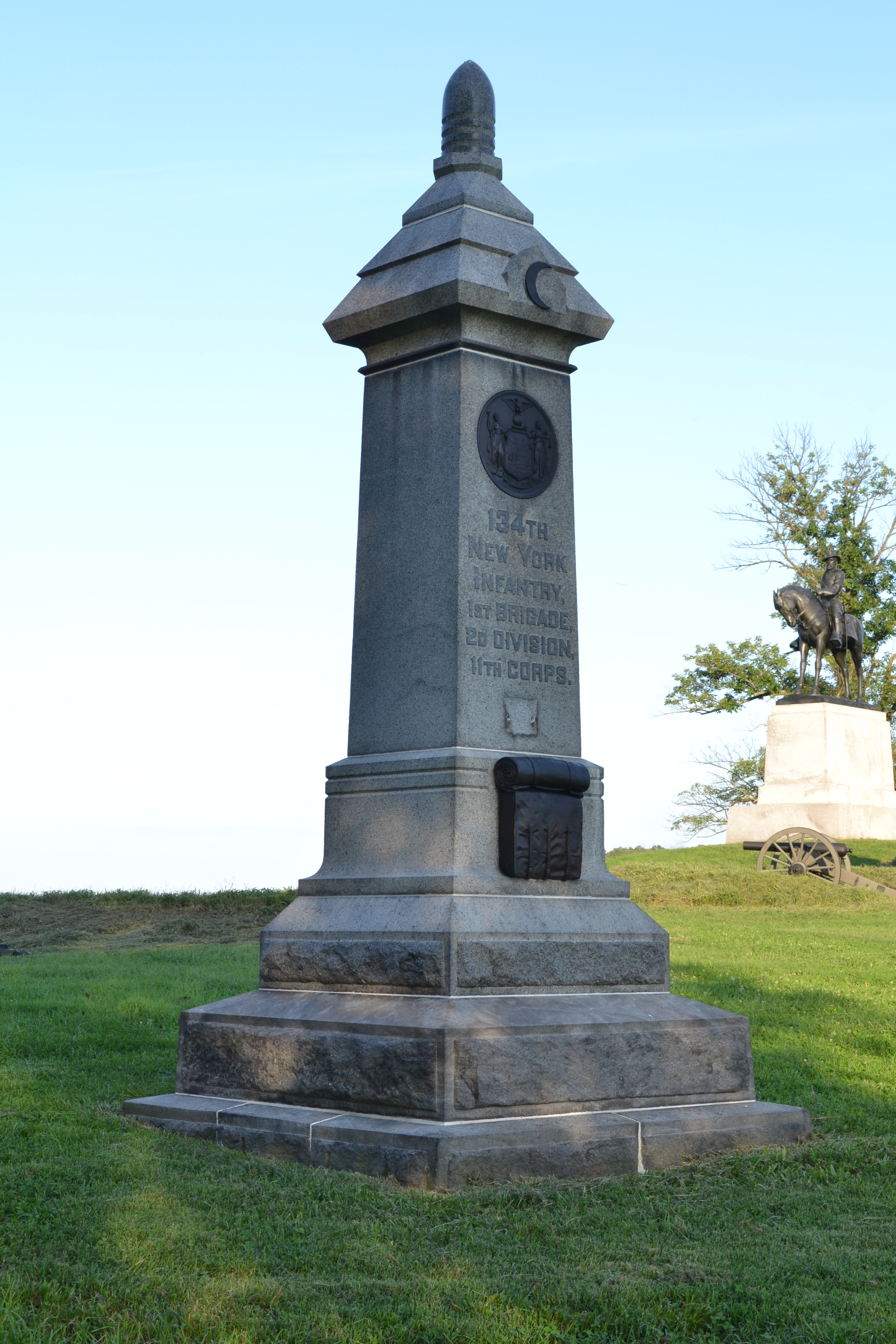
134th New York Infantry monument at Gettysburg Battlefield

The 134th New York Infantry Regiment was an infantry regiment in the Union Army during the American Civil War.

== Service ==
The 134th New York Infantry was organized at Schoharie, New York beginning July 9, 1862 and mustered in for three years service on September 22, 1862 under the command of Colonel George E. Danforth.

The regiment was attached to 2nd Brigade, 2nd Division, XI Corps, Army of the Potomac, to October 1863, and Army of the Cumberland to April 1864. 2nd Brigade, 2nd Division, XX Corps, Army of the Cumberland, to June 1865.

The 134th New York Infantry mustered out of service June 10, 1865. Recruits and veterans were transferred to the 102nd New York Volunteer Infantry.

== Detailed service ==
Left New York for Washington, D.C., September 25, 1862. Joined XI Corps at Fairfax Court House, Va., October 2, 1862, and duty there until November 1. Movement to Warrenton, then to Germantown November 1–20. March to Fredericksburg, Va., December 10–15. At Falmouth until April 27, 1863. "Mud March" January 20–24. Chancellorsville Campaign April 27-May 6. Battle of Chancellorsville May 1–5. Gettysburg Campaign June 11-July 24. Battle of Gettysburg July 1–3. Pursuit of Lee July 5–24. At Bristoe Station to September 24. Movement to Bridgeport, Ala., September 24-October 3. March along line of Nashville & Chattanooga Railroad to Lookout Valley October 25–29. Reopening Tennessee River October 26–29. Battle of Wauhatchie, Tenn., October 28–29. Chattanooga-Ringgold Campaign November 23–27. Orchard Knob November 23. Tunnel Hill November 24–25. Missionary Ridge November 25. March to relief of Knoxville November 27-December 17. Duty in Lookout Valley until May 1864. Atlanta Campaign May 1-September 8. Demonstration on Rocky Faced Ridge May 8–11. Dug Gap or Mill Creek May 8. Battle of Resaca May 14–15. Near Cassville May 19. New Hope Church May 25. Battles about Dallas, New Hope Church, and Allatoona Hills May 26-June 5. Operations about Marietta and against Kennesaw Mountain June 10-July 2. Pine Hill June 11–14. Lost Mountain June 15–17. Gilgal or Golgotha Church June 15. Muddy Creek June 17. Noyes' Creek June 19. Kolb's Farm June 22. Assault on Kennesaw June 27. Ruff's Station, Smyrna Camp Ground, July 4. Chattahoochie River July 6–17. Peachtree Creek July 19–20. Siege of Atlanta July 22-August 25. Operations at Chattahoochie River Bridge August 26-September 2. Occupation of Atlanta September 2-November 15. Expedition from Atlanta to Tuckum's Cross Roads October 26–29. Near Atlanta November 9. March to the sea November 15-December 10. Siege of Savannah December 10–21. Carolinas Campaign January to April 1865. Averysboro, N.C., March 16. Battle of Bentonville March 19–21. Occupation of Goldsboro March 24. Advance on Raleigh April 9–14. Occupation of Raleigh April 14. Bennett's House April 26. Surrender of Johnston and his army. March to Washington, D.C., via Richmond, Va., April 29-May 20. Grand Review of the Armies May 24.

== Detailed Timeline with Commands ==
Year	Month	Day	Activity	Army	Army Commander	Corps	CORPS Commander	Division	Division Commander	Brigade	Brigade Commander	BN Commander
1862	July	9	Started to organize at Schoharie, New York	NY State							Colonel George E. Danforth	
1862	September	22	Mustered in for three years of service	NY State							Colonel George E. Danforth	
1862	September	25	Left New York for Washington, D.C	NY State							Colonel George E. Danforth	
1862	October	2	Joined XI Corps at Fairfax Court House, Va	Army of the Potomac	Major General George B. McClellan	XI Crescent Moon	Franz Sigel	2nd		2nd	COL Coster	
1862	November	1–20	Movement to Warrenton, then to Germantown	Army of the Potomac	Major General George B. McClellan	XI Crescent Moon	Franz Sigel	2nd		2nd		
1862	December	10–15	March to Fredericksburg, Va.	Army of the Potomac	Major General Ambrose E. Burnside	XI Crescent Moon	Franz Sigel	2nd		2nd		
1863	January	20–24	"Mud March"	Army of the Potomac	Major General Ambrose E. Burnside	XI Crescent Moon	Carl Schurz *	2nd		2nd		
1863	April	until 27	At Falmouth	Army of the Potomac	Major General Joseph Hooker	XI Crescent Moon	Oliver Otis Howard *	2nd		2nd		
1863		April 27-May 6	Chancellorsville Campaign	Army of the Potomac	Major General Joseph Hooker	XI Crescent Moon	Oliver Otis Howard *	2nd		2nd		
1863	May	1-5	Battle of Chancellorsville	Army of the Potomac	Major General Joseph Hooker	XI Crescent Moon	Oliver Otis Howard *	2nd		2nd		
1863		June 11-July 24	Gettysburg Campaign	Army of the Potomac	Major General Joseph Hooker	XI Crescent Moon	Oliver Otis Howard *	2nd		2nd		LTC Allan H. Jackson
1863	July	1-3	Battle of Gettysburg	Army of the Potomac	Major General George G. Meade	XI Crescent Moon	Oliver Otis Howard *	2nd		2nd		LTC Allan H. Jackson
1863	July	5-24	Pursuit of Lee	Army of the Potomac	Major General George G. Meade	XI Crescent Moon	Oliver Otis Howard *	2nd		2nd		LTC Allan H. Jackson
1863	September	24	At Bristoe Station to	Army of the Potomac	Major General George G. Meade	XI Crescent Moon	Oliver Otis Howard *	2nd		2nd		LTC Allan H. Jackson
1863		September 24-October 3	Movement to Bridgeport, Ala.	Army of the Potomac	Major General George G. Meade	XI Crescent Moon	Oliver Otis Howard *	2nd		2nd		LTC Allan H. Jackson
1863	October	25-29	March along line of Nashville & Chattanooga Railroad to Lookout Valley	Army of the Cumberland	Major General George H. Thomas	XI Crescent Moon	Oliver Otis Howard *	2nd		2nd		LTC Allan H. Jackson
1863	October	26-29	Reopening Tennessee River	Army of the Cumberland	Major General George H. Thomas	XI Crescent Moon	Oliver Otis Howard *	2nd		2nd		LTC Allan H. Jackson
1863	October	28-29	Battle of Wauhatchie, Tenn.	Army of the Cumberland	Major General George H. Thomas	XI Crescent Moon	Oliver Otis Howard *	2nd		2nd		LTC Allan H. Jackson
1863	November	23-27	Chattanooga-Ringgold Campaign	Army of the Cumberland	Major General George H. Thomas	XI Crescent Moon	Oliver Otis Howard *	2nd		2nd		LTC Allan H. Jackson
1863	November	23	Orchard Knob	Army of the Cumberland	Major General George H. Thomas	XI Crescent Moon	Oliver Otis Howard *	2nd		2nd		LTC Allan H. Jackson
1863	November	24-25	Tunnel Hill	Army of the Cumberland	Major General George H. Thomas	XI Crescent Moon	Oliver Otis Howard *	2nd		2nd		LTC Allan H. Jackson
1863	November	25	Missionary Ridge	Army of the Cumberland	Major General George H. Thomas	XI Crescent Moon	Oliver Otis Howard *	2nd		2nd		LTC Allan H. Jackson
1863		November 27-December 17	March to relief of Knoxville	Army of the Cumberland	Major General George H. Thomas	XI Crescent Moon	Oliver Otis Howard *	2nd		2nd		LTC Allan H. Jackson
1864		until May	Duty in Lookout Valley	Army of the Cumberland	Major General George H. Thomas	XI Crescent Moon	Oliver Otis Howard *	2nd		2nd		LTC Allan H. Jackson
1864		May 1-September 8	Atlanta Campaign	Army of the Cumberland	Major General George H. Thomas	XX Star	Major General Joseph Hooker	2nd		2nd		LTC Allan H. Jackson
1864	May	8-11	Demonstration on Rocky Faced Ridge	Army of the Cumberland	Major General George H. Thomas	XX Star	Major General Joseph Hooker	2nd		2nd		LTC Allan H. Jackson
1864	May	8	Dug Gap or Mill Creek	Army of the Cumberland	Major General George H. Thomas	XX Star	Major General Joseph Hooker	2nd		2nd		LTC Allan H. Jackson
1864	May	14-15	Battle of Resaca	Army of the Cumberland	Major General George H. Thomas	XX Star	Major General Joseph Hooker	2nd		2nd		LTC Allan H. Jackson
1864	May	19	Near Cassville	Army of the Cumberland	Major General George H. Thomas	XX Star	Major General Joseph Hooker	2nd		2nd		LTC Allan H. Jackson
1864	May	25	New Hope Church	Army of the Cumberland	Major General George H. Thomas	XX Star	Major General Joseph Hooker	2nd		2nd		LTC Allan H. Jackson
1864		May 26-June 5	Battles about Dallas, New Hope Church and Allatoona Hills	Army of the Cumberland	Major General George H. Thomas	XX Star	Major General Joseph Hooker	2nd		2nd		LTC Allan H. Jackson
1864		June 10-July 2	Operations about Marietta and against Kennesaw Mountain	Army of the Cumberland	Major General George H. Thomas	XX Star	Major General Joseph Hooker	2nd		2nd		LTC Allan H. Jackson
1864	June	11-14	Pine Hill	Army of the Cumberland	Major General George H. Thomas	XX Star	Major General Joseph Hooker	2nd		2nd		LTC Allan H. Jackson
1864	June	15-17	Lost Mountain	Army of the Cumberland	Major General George H. Thomas	XX Star	Major General Joseph Hooker	2nd		2nd		LTC Allan H. Jackson
1864	June	15	Gilgal or Golgotha Church	Army of the Cumberland	Major General George H. Thomas	XX Star	Major General Joseph Hooker	2nd		2nd		LTC Allan H. Jackson
1864	June	17	Muddy Creek	Army of the Cumberland	Major General George H. Thomas	XX Star	Major General Joseph Hooker	2nd		2nd		LTC Allan H. Jackson
1864	June	19	Noyes' Creek	Army of the Cumberland	Major General George H. Thomas	XX Star	Major General Joseph Hooker	2nd		2nd		LTC Allan H. Jackson
1864	June	22	Kolb's Farm	Army of the Cumberland	Major General George H. Thomas	XX Star	Major General Joseph Hooker	2nd		2nd		LTC Allan H. Jackson
1864	June	27	Assault on Kennesaw	Army of the Cumberland	Major General George H. Thomas	XX Star	Major General Joseph Hooker	2nd	Brig. Gen. John W. Geary	2nd	COL. Patrick H. Jones	LTC Allan H. Jackson
1864	July	4	Ruff's Station, Smyrna Camp Ground	Army of the Cumberland	Major General George H. Thomas	XX Star	Major General Joseph Hooker	2nd		2nd		LTC Allan H. Jackson
1864	July	6-17	Chattahoochie River	Army of the Cumberland	Major General George H. Thomas	XX Star	Major General Joseph Hooker	2nd		2nd		LTC Allan H. Jackson
1864	July	19-20	Peachtree Creek	Army of the Cumberland	Major General George H. Thomas	XX Star	Major General Joseph Hooker	2nd		2nd		LTC Allan H. Jackson
1864		July 22-August 25	Siege of Atlanta	Army of the Cumberland	Major General George H. Thomas	XX Star	Alpheus S. Williams	2nd		2nd		LTC Allan H. Jackson
1864		August 26-September 2	Operations at Chattahoochie River Bridge	Army of the Cumberland	Major General George H. Thomas	XX Star	Henry W. Slocum	2nd		2nd		LTC Allan H. Jackson
1864		September 2-November 15	Occupation of Atlanta	Army of the Cumberland	Major General George H. Thomas	XX Star	Henry W. Slocum	2nd		2nd		LTC Allan H. Jackson
1864	October	26-29	Expedition from Atlanta to Tuckum's Cross Roads	Army of the Cumberland	Major General George H. Thomas	XX Star	Henry W. Slocum	2nd		2nd		LTC Allan H. Jackson
1864	November	9	Near Atlanta	Army of the Cumberland	Major General George H. Thomas	XX Star	Henry W. Slocum	2nd		2nd		LTC Allan H. Jackson
1864		November 15-December 10	March to the sea	Army of the Cumberland	Major General George H. Thomas	XX Star	Alpheus S. Williams	2nd		2nd		LTC Allan H. Jackson
1864		December 10–21	Siege of Savannah	Army of the Cumberland	Major General George H. Thomas	XX Star	Alpheus S. Williams	2nd		2nd		LTC Allan H. Jackson
1865		January to April	Carolinas Campaign	Army of the Cumberland	Major General George H. Thomas	XX Star	Alpheus S. Williams	2nd		2nd		LTC Allan H. Jackson
1865	March	16	Averysboro, N.C.	Army of the Cumberland	Major General George H. Thomas	XX Star	Alpheus S. Williams	2nd		2nd		LTC Allan H. Jackson
1865	March	19 - 21	Battle of Bentonville	Army of the Cumberland	Major General George H. Thomas	XX Star	Alpheus S. Williams	2nd		2nd		LTC Allan H. Jackson
1865	March	24	Occupation of Goldsboro	Army of the Cumberland	Major General George H. Thomas	XX Star	Alpheus S. Williams	2nd		2nd		LTC Allan H. Jackson
1865	April	9-14.	Advance on Raleigh	Army of the Cumberland	Major General George H. Thomas	XX Star	Joseph A. Mower	2nd		2nd		LTC Allan H. Jackson
1865	April	14	Occupation of Raleigh	Army of the Cumberland	Major General George H. Thomas	XX Star	Joseph A. Mower	2nd		2nd		LTC Allan H. Jackson
1865	April	26	Bennett's House	Army of the Cumberland	Major General George H. Thomas	XX Star	Joseph A. Mower	2nd		2nd		LTC Allan H. Jackson
1865			Surrender of Johnston and his army.	Army of the Cumberland	Major General George H. Thomas	XX Star	Joseph A. Mower	2nd		2nd		LTC Allan H. Jackson
1865		April 29-May 20	March to Washington D.C. via Richmond VA	Army of the Cumberland	Major General George H. Thomas	XX Star	Joseph A. Mower	2nd		2nd		LTC Allan H. Jackson
1865	May	24	Grand Review of the Armies¬†	Army of the Cumberland	Major General George H. Thomas	XX Star	Joseph A. Mower	2nd		2nd		LTC Allan H. Jackson
1865	June	10	The 134th New York Infantry mustered out of service	Army of the Cumberland	Major General George H. Thomas	XX Star	Joseph A. Mower	2nd		2nd		LTC Allan H. Jackson

== Assault on Kennesaw Mountain ==
The 134th was organized under XX Corps (Hooker), 2ND DIV. (Geary), 2ND BRIG. (Jones). The 134th was part of the frontal assault. Placed at the front of Brig. Gen. John W. Geary troops under COL Patrick H. Jones. The 134th assaulted just west of Dead Angle.

== Casualties ==
The regiment lost a total of 122 men during service; 2 officers and 41 enlisted men killed or mortally wounded, 1 officer and 78 enlisted men died of disease.

== Commanders ==
- Colonel George E. Danforth
- Colonel Charles R. Coster
- Colonel Allan H. Jackson - commanded at the Battle of Gettysburg while still at the rank of lieutenant colonel

== See also ==
- List of New York Civil War regiments
- New York in the Civil War
