= 134th Illinois Infantry Regiment =

134th Regiment Illinois Volunteer Infantry
- Illinois state flag
- Active: May 31, 1864, to October 5, 1864
- Country: United States
- Allegiance: Union
- Branch: Infantry

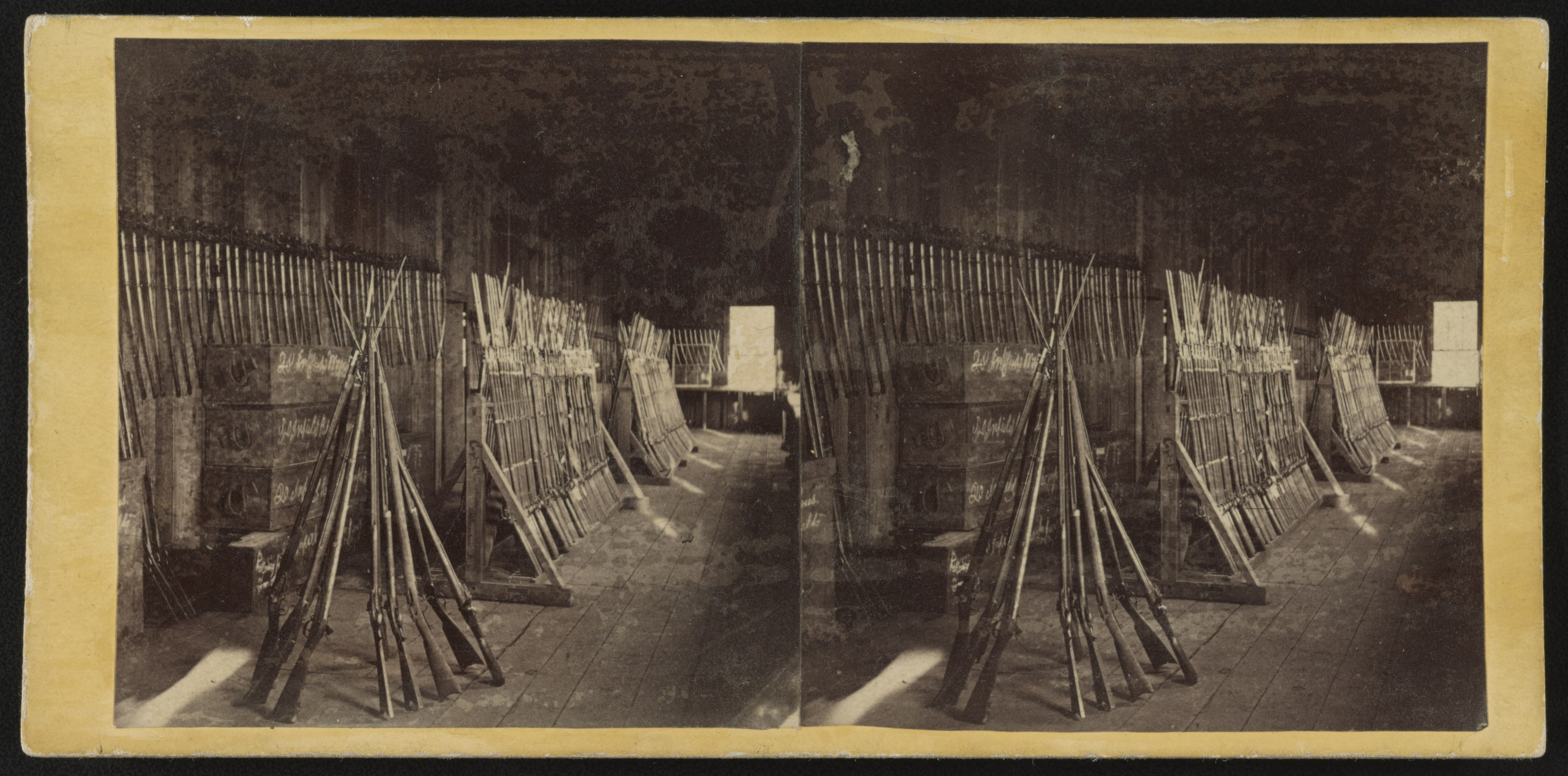
Bayoneted rifles on racks at arsenal of 134th Illinois Volunteer Infantry, Columbus, Kentucky

The 134th Regiment Illinois Volunteer Infantry was an infantry regiment that served in the Union Army during the American Civil War. It was among scores of regiments that were raised in the summer of 1864 and known as Hundred Days Men, an effort to augment existing manpower for an all-out push to end the war within 100 days.

== Service ==
The 134th Illinois Infantry was organized in Chicago, Illinois, and mustered into Federal service on May 31, 1864, for a short, one-hundred-day enlistment. The 134th served in the garrison of Columbus, Kentucky.

The regiment was mustered out of service on October 25, 1864, in Chicago.

== Total strength and casualties ==
The regiment suffered the deaths of one officer and 20 enlisted men who died of disease, for a total of 21 fatalities.

== Commanders ==
- Colonel Waters W. McChesney - mustered out with the regiment.

== See also ==
- List of Illinois Civil War Units
- Illinois in the American Civil War
