= 134 BC =

134 BC in various calendars
- Gregorian calendar: 134 BC; CXXXIV BC
- Ab urbe condita: 620
- Ancient Egypt era: XXXIII dynasty, 190
- Pharaoh: Ptolemy VIII Physcon, 12
- Ancient Greek Olympiad (summer): 161st Olympiad, year 3
- Assyrian calendar: 4617
- Balinese saka calendar: N/A
- Bengali calendar: −727 – −726
- Berber calendar: 817
- Buddhist calendar: 411
- Burmese calendar: −771
- Byzantine calendar: 5375–5376
- Chinese calendar: 丙午年 (Fire Horse); 2564 or 2357 — to — 丁未年 (Fire Goat); 2565 or 2358
- Coptic calendar: −417 – −416
- Discordian calendar: 1033
- Ethiopian calendar: −141 – −140
- Hebrew calendar: 3627–3628
- Hindu calendars
- Vikram Samvat: −77 – −76
- Shaka Samvat: N/A
- Kali Yuga: 2967–2968
- Holocene calendar: 9867
- Iranian calendar: 755 BP – 754 BP
- Islamic calendar: 778 BH – 777 BH
- Javanese calendar: N/A
- Julian calendar: N/A
- Korean calendar: 2200
- Minguo calendar: 2045 before ROC 民前2045年
- Nanakshahi calendar: −1601
- Seleucid era: 178/179 AG
- Thai solar calendar: 409–410
- Tibetan calendar: མེ་ཕོ་རྟ་ལོ་ (male Fire-Horse) −7 or −388 or −1160 — to — མེ་མོ་ལུག་ལོ་ (female Fire-Sheep) −6 or −387 or −1159

Year 134 BC was a year of the pre-Julian Roman calendar. At the time it was known as the Year of the Consulship of Aemilianus and Flaccus (or, less frequently, year 620 Ab urbe condita) and the First Year of Yuanguang. The denomination 134 BC for this year has been used since the early medieval period, when the Anno Domini calendar era became the prevalent method in Europe for naming years.

== Events ==
=== By place ===
==== Roman Republic ====
- Scipio Aemilianus, victor of Carthage, takes command in Spain against the Numantians. He recruits 20,000 men and 40,000 allies, including Numidian cavalry under Jugurtha. Scipio, an expert in sieges, builds a ring of seven forts and a ditch palisade before beginning the Siege of Numantia. The perimeter of the circumvallations is twice as long as that of the city. The river Durius (Douro), enables the defenders to be supplied by small boats.
- Caius Fulvius Flaccus, as consul, is sent against the slaves. Uprising of 4,000 slaves crushed at Sinuessa, in Campania. Slave uprisings repressed in Attic silver mines and on the island of Delos.

==== Judea ====
- John Hyrcanus becomes high priest and prince (ruler) of Judea, until 104 BC, following the murder of his father Simon Maccabaeus by Ptolemy the son of Abubus in 135 BC.

==== China ====
- On the advice of philosopher Dong Zhongshu, Emperor Wu of Han promotes Confucianism as the official doctrine of the Han dynasty and assigns special merit to the Book of Rites, the Classic of Music, the Classic of Poetry, the Book of Documents, I Ching (the Book of Changes) and the Spring and Autumn Annals.

=== By topic ===
==== Astronomy ====
- Hipparchus discovers the precession of the equinoxes.
- Hipparchus creates a star catalogue.

== Births ==
- Jin Midi, Chinese politician and co-regent (d. 86 BC)
- Posidonius of Apamea, Stoic philosopher and polymath (d. 51 BC)
- Publius Servilius Vatia Isauricus, Roman statesman (d. 44 BC)

== Deaths ==
- Simon Thassi, High Priest of Judaea (r. 142-134 BC)
