= 134th meridian west =

Line of longitude

134th meridian west

The meridian 134° west of Greenwich is a line of longitude that extends from the North Pole across the Arctic Ocean, North America, the Pacific Ocean, the Southern Ocean, and Antarctica to the South Pole.

The 134th meridian west forms a great circle with the 46th meridian east.

== From Pole to Pole ==
Starting at the North Pole and heading south to the South Pole, the 134th meridian west passes through:

Co-ordinates	Country, territory or sea	Notes
90°0′N 134°0′W	Arctic Ocean	
74°41′N 134°0′W	Beaufort Sea	
69°32′N 134°0′W	Canada	Northwest Territories — Richards Island and mainland Yukon — for about 2 km from 67°0′N 134°0′W; Northwest Territories — for about 8 km from 66°59′N 134°0′W; Yukon — from 66°55′N 134°0′W; British Columbia — from 60°0′N 134°0′W
58°47′N 134°0′W	United States	Alaska — Alaska Panhandle (mainland) and Admiralty Island
57°19′N 134°0′W	Frederick Sound	
57°4′N 134°0′W	United States	Alaska — Kupreanof Island and Kuiu Island
56°5′N 134°0′W	Pacific Ocean	Passing between Coronation Island and Warren Island, Alaska, United States; Passing just west of Noyes Island, Alaska, United States
60°0′S 134°0′W	Southern Ocean	
74°29′S 134°0′W	Antarctica	Unclaimed territory

== See also ==
- 133rd meridian west
- 135th meridian west
