= Parastasia selangorica =

Scientific classification
- Kingdom: Animalia
- Phylum: Arthropoda
- Clade: Pancrustacea
- Class: Insecta
- Order: Coleoptera
- Suborder: Polyphaga
- Infraorder: Scarabaeiformia
- Family: Scarabaeidae
- Genus: Parastasia
- Species: P. selangorica

Binomial name
- Parastasia selangorica Kuijten, 1992

Species of beetle

Parastasia selangorica is a species of beetle of the family Scarabaeidae. It is found in Malaysia.

== Description ==
Adults reach a length of about 14.5–16 mm (0.57–0.63 in). They are similar to Parastasia melanocephaloides and Parastasia melanocephala, but the scutellum and terminal tergites are dark piceous.
