= P. brevipes =

P. brevipes may refer to:

- Pachytriton brevipes, the spotted paddle-tail newt, a species of amphibian native to China
- Paralithodes brevipes, hanasakigani, a species of king crab
- Parastasia brevipes, a species of shining leaf chafer in the family Scarabaeidae
- Pelophryne brevipes, a species of toad in the family Bufonidae
- Phyllariopsis brevipes, a species of large brown algae
- Pileolaria brevipes, poison ivy rust, a species of fungus in the order Pucciniales
- Pisaurina brevipes, a species of nursery web spider
- Plethodontohyla brevipes, a species of frog in the family Microhylidae
- Pseudocalotes brevipes, the Vietnam false bloodsucker, a species of agamid lizard
- Psittacara brevipes, the Socorro parakeet, a species of bird in the subfamily Arinae
