= Parastasia cingala =

Scientific classification
- Kingdom: Animalia
- Phylum: Arthropoda
- Clade: Pancrustacea
- Class: Insecta
- Order: Coleoptera
- Suborder: Polyphaga
- Infraorder: Scarabaeiformia
- Family: Scarabaeidae
- Genus: Parastasia
- Species: P. cingala

Binomial name
- Parastasia cingala Arrow, 1899

Species of beetle

Parastasia cingala is a species of beetle of the family Scarabaeidae. It is found in Sri Lanka.

== Description ==
Adults reach a length of about 11.5–15 mm (0.45–0.59 in). The colour is identical to that of Parastasia basalis.
