= Parastasia isidai =

Scientific classification
- Kingdom: Animalia
- Phylum: Arthropoda
- Clade: Pancrustacea
- Class: Insecta
- Order: Coleoptera
- Suborder: Polyphaga
- Infraorder: Scarabaeiformia
- Family: Scarabaeidae
- Genus: Parastasia
- Species: P. isidai

Binomial name
- Parastasia isidai Wada, 1989

Species of beetle

Parastasia isidai is a species of beetle of the family Scarabaeidae. It is found in the Philippines (Negros).

== Description ==
Adults reach a length of about 15.5–20.4 mm (0.61–0.80 in). The head is black, while the antennae, legs and ventral surface are dark brown to black, and the rest of the dorsal surface is dark orange.

== Taxonomy ==
In his revision of the Parastasia genus, Kuijten placed isidai as a synonym of Parastasia helleri. Wada reinstated isidai as a valid species in 2003.
