= Parastasia weberi =

Scientific classification
- Kingdom: Animalia
- Phylum: Arthropoda
- Clade: Pancrustacea
- Class: Insecta
- Order: Coleoptera
- Suborder: Polyphaga
- Infraorder: Scarabaeiformia
- Family: Scarabaeidae
- Genus: Parastasia
- Species: P. weberi

Binomial name
- Parastasia weberi Ohaus, 1898

Species of beetle

Parastasia weberi is a species of beetle of the family Scarabaeidae. It is found in Indonesia (Irian Jaya).

== Description ==
Adults reach a length of about 9–10.5 mm (0.35–0.41 in). They are similar to Parastasia nigromaculata, but uniformly dark reddish black dorsally.
