= Parastasia marmorata =

Scientific classification
- Kingdom: Animalia
- Phylum: Arthropoda
- Clade: Pancrustacea
- Class: Insecta
- Order: Coleoptera
- Suborder: Polyphaga
- Infraorder: Scarabaeiformia
- Family: Scarabaeidae
- Genus: Parastasia
- Species: P. marmorata

Binomial name
- Parastasia marmorata Gestro, 1876

Synonyms
- Parastasia discophora Schaufuss, 1887

Species of beetle

Parastasia marmorata is a species of beetle of the family Scarabaeidae. It is found in Papua New Guinea and Indonesia (Sulawesi).

== Description ==
Adults reach a length of about 11.5–15.5 mm (0.45–0.61 in). All characters are within the range of variability of Parastasia bimaculata, except for the different colour pattern of subspecies discophora and the parameres of both subspecies.

== Subspecies ==
- Parastasia marmorata marmorata (Papua New Guinea)
- Parastasia marmorata discophora Schaufuss, 1887 (Indonesia: Sulawesi)
