= Parastasia sawadai =

Scientific classification
- Kingdom: Animalia
- Phylum: Arthropoda
- Clade: Pancrustacea
- Class: Insecta
- Order: Coleoptera
- Suborder: Polyphaga
- Infraorder: Scarabaeiformia
- Family: Scarabaeidae
- Genus: Parastasia
- Species: P. sawadai

Binomial name
- Parastasia sawadai Wada, 2003

Species of beetle

Parastasia sawadai is a species of beetle of the family Scarabaeidae. It is found in Vietnam and China (Guangxi).

== Description ==
Adults reach a length of about 10.1–11.7 mm (0.40–0.46 in). The dorsal surface, ventral surface and legs are blackish brown to black, but the elytra are reddish brown with orange areas. The apical part of the propygidium is reddish brown, while the basal part is orange. The dorsal surface (except the scutellum) and ventral surface bear yellow setae.
