= Parastasia dempuensis =

Scientific classification
- Kingdom: Animalia
- Phylum: Arthropoda
- Clade: Pancrustacea
- Class: Insecta
- Order: Coleoptera
- Suborder: Polyphaga
- Infraorder: Scarabaeiformia
- Family: Scarabaeidae
- Genus: Parastasia
- Species: P. dempuensis

Binomial name
- Parastasia dempuensis Wada, 2008

Species of beetle

Parastasia dempuensis is a species of beetle of the family Scarabaeidae. It is found in Indonesia (Sumatra).

== Description ==
Adults reach a length of about 19.8 mm (0.78 in). The head is black, while the antennae, legs and ventral surface are dark brown to black and the dorsal surface is reddish brown. The pygidium is dark reddish brown.

== Etymology ==
The species name is derived from the type locality, Mt. Dempu, South Sumatra.
