= Parastasia coquereli =

Scientific classification
- Kingdom: Animalia
- Phylum: Arthropoda
- Clade: Pancrustacea
- Class: Insecta
- Order: Coleoptera
- Suborder: Polyphaga
- Infraorder: Scarabaeiformia
- Family: Scarabaeidae
- Genus: Parastasia
- Species: P. coquereli

Binomial name
- Parastasia coquereli Fairmaire, 1868

Species of beetle

Parastasia coquereli is a species of beetle of the family Scarabaeidae. It is found on the Seychelles and Mauritius.

== Description ==
Adults reach a length of about 16–20.5 mm (0.63–0.81 in). They are reddish brown to dark yellowish brown, with the elytra with or without a large lighter area. Often, there are several darker spots within the lighter area. Some specimens are entirely dark reddish brown. Females normally have a dark reddish to blackish ground colour.
