= Parastasia takeshii =

Scientific classification
- Kingdom: Animalia
- Phylum: Arthropoda
- Clade: Pancrustacea
- Class: Insecta
- Order: Coleoptera
- Suborder: Polyphaga
- Infraorder: Scarabaeiformia
- Family: Scarabaeidae
- Genus: Parastasia
- Species: P. takeshii

Binomial name
- Parastasia takeshii Wada, 1997

Species of beetle

Parastasia takeshii is a species of beetle of the family Scarabaeidae. It is found in the Philippines (Mindanao).

== Description ==
Adults reach a length of about 15.2 mm (0.60 in). The head is black, while the pronotum, scutellum, elytra, propygidium, ventral surface and legs are reddish brown. The pronotum has two round, black patches and each elytron has four black patches. The head is clothed with yellowish brown setae.
