= Parastasia duchoni =

Scientific classification
- Kingdom: Animalia
- Phylum: Arthropoda
- Clade: Pancrustacea
- Class: Insecta
- Order: Coleoptera
- Suborder: Polyphaga
- Infraorder: Scarabaeiformia
- Family: Scarabaeidae
- Genus: Parastasia
- Species: P. duchoni

Binomial name
- Parastasia duchoni Ohaus, 1898

Synonyms
- Parastasia femorata duchoni Ohaus, 1898; Parastasia quinquemaculata Arrow, 1899; Caelidia quinquemaculata Dejean, 1833

Species of beetle

Parastasia duchoni is a species of beetle of the family Scarabaeidae. It is found in Indonesia (Java, Sumbawa).

== Description ==
Adults reach a length of about 10.5–13 mm (0.41–0.51 in). The head is dark reddish brown to black, while the pronotum is light reddish orange, with a darkened anterior margin. There are two reddish to black spots on the disc. The scutellum is dark reddish to nearly black, while the elytra are somewhat darker than the pronotum, with two dark reddish to black spots. The propygidium, pygidium and underside are reddish orange to reddish black and the legs are light brownish.
