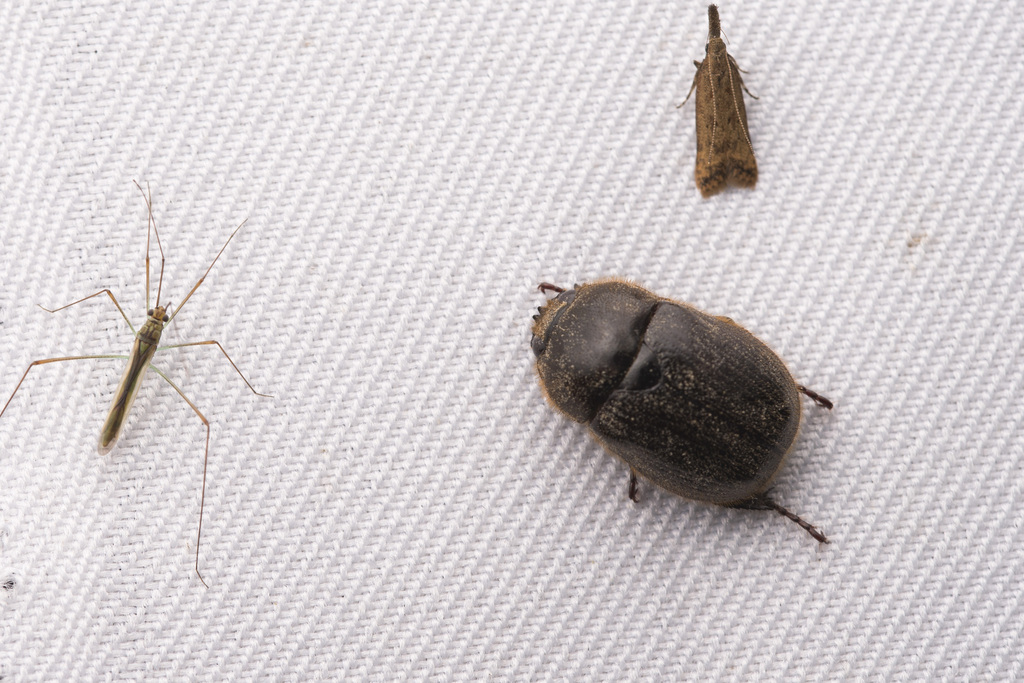
- Parastasia ferrieri formosana

Scientific classification
- Kingdom: Animalia
- Phylum: Arthropoda
- Clade: Pancrustacea
- Class: Insecta
- Order: Coleoptera
- Suborder: Polyphaga
- Infraorder: Scarabaeiformia
- Family: Scarabaeidae
- Genus: Parastasia
- Species: P. ferrieri

Binomial name
- Parastasia ferrieri Nonfried, 1895

Synonyms
- Ohkubous ferrieri boninensis Nakane, 1983; Ohkubous ferrieri ichikawai Nakane, 1983; Parastasia ferrieri sakishimana Nomura, 1965; Parastasia ferrieri tokarana Nomura, 1964; Ohkubous quadridentatus Sawada, 1938

= Parastasia ferrieri =

Species of beetle

Parastasia ferrieri is a species of beetle of the family Scarabaeidae. It is found in Taiwan, China (Fujian, Liaoning), Japan, Korea and Vietnam.

== Description ==
Adults reach a length of about 10–15.5 mm (0.39–0.61 in). The head and scutellum are reddish black to black, while the pronotum is orange to reddish and the elytra are dark reddish black or black, with a reddish area. The propygidium is reddish, the pygidium is orange to red in males and dark reddish to blackish in females. The underside and legs are dark reddish or brownish.

== Subspecies ==
- Parastasia ferrieri ferrieri (China: Fujian, Liaoning; Japan; Korea; Vietnam)
- Parastasia ferrieri formosana Ohaus, 1925 (Taiwan)
