= Parastasia wallacea =

Scientific classification
- Kingdom: Animalia
- Phylum: Arthropoda
- Clade: Pancrustacea
- Class: Insecta
- Order: Coleoptera
- Suborder: Polyphaga
- Infraorder: Scarabaeiformia
- Family: Scarabaeidae
- Genus: Parastasia
- Species: P. wallacea

Binomial name
- Parastasia wallacea Kuijten, 1992

Species of beetle

Parastasia wallacea is a species of beetle of the family Scarabaeidae. It is found in Indonesia (Sulawesi).

== Description ==
Adults reach a length of about 17 mm (0.67 in). They are black, except for the reddish orange pronotum, which has a small dark patch and darkened margins.
