= Parastasia masumotoi =

Scientific classification
- Kingdom: Animalia
- Phylum: Arthropoda
- Clade: Pancrustacea
- Class: Insecta
- Order: Coleoptera
- Suborder: Polyphaga
- Infraorder: Scarabaeiformia
- Family: Scarabaeidae
- Genus: Parastasia
- Species: P. masumotoi

Binomial name
- Parastasia masumotoi Wada & Muramoto, 1999

Species of beetle

Parastasia masumotoi is a species of beetle of the family Scarabaeidae. It is found in Thailand.

== Description ==
Adults reach a length of about 14.2–15.9 mm (0.56–0.63 in). The antennae, margins of the pronotum, scutellum, elytra, ventral surface and legs are dark brown to black. The elytra have a dark orange patch. The pronotum, propygidium and pygidium are orange.
