= Parastasia luzonensis =

Scientific classification
- Kingdom: Animalia
- Phylum: Arthropoda
- Clade: Pancrustacea
- Class: Insecta
- Order: Coleoptera
- Suborder: Polyphaga
- Infraorder: Scarabaeiformia
- Family: Scarabaeidae
- Genus: Parastasia
- Species: P. luzonensis

Binomial name
- Parastasia luzonensis Wada, 2016

Species of beetle

Parastasia luzonensis is a species of beetle of the family Scarabaeidae. It is found in the Philippines (Luzon).

== Description ==
Adults reach a length of about 15.2 mm (0.60 in). The head, scutellum, elytral sutute, propygidium and pygidium are black, while the pronotum is dark orange and the antennae, elytra, ventral surface and legs are reddish brown to dark reddish brown. The pronotum has a V-shaped black patch and the elytra have a black band.

== Etymology ==
The species is named after the type locality, Luzon Island.
