= Parastasia exophthalma =

Scientific classification
- Kingdom: Animalia
- Phylum: Arthropoda
- Clade: Pancrustacea
- Class: Insecta
- Order: Coleoptera
- Suborder: Polyphaga
- Infraorder: Scarabaeiformia
- Family: Scarabaeidae
- Genus: Parastasia
- Species: P. exophthalma

Binomial name
- Parastasia exophthalma Kuijten, 1992

Species of beetle

Parastasia exophthalma is a species of beetle of the family Scarabaeidae. It is found in Indonesia (Irian Jaya).

== Description ==
Adults reach a length of about 12–13.5 mm (0.47–0.53 in). The head is black, with a brownish clypeus. The rest of the body is yellowish brown with various dark and brownish black spots. The underside and legs are somewhat darkened and reddish to brown.
