= Parastasia nigripennis =

Scientific classification
- Kingdom: Animalia
- Phylum: Arthropoda
- Clade: Pancrustacea
- Class: Insecta
- Order: Coleoptera
- Suborder: Polyphaga
- Infraorder: Scarabaeiformia
- Family: Scarabaeidae
- Genus: Parastasia
- Species: P. nigripennis

Binomial name
- Parastasia nigripennis Sharp, 1881

Species of beetle

Parastasia nigripennis is a species of beetle of the family Scarabaeidae. It is found in Indonesia (Sumatra, Kalimantan) and Malaysia (Sarawak).

== Description ==
Adults reach a length of about 10–12.5 mm (0.39–0.49 in). The head is dark reddish to black, while the pronotum is light brown to orange and the scutellum is brownish to orange. The elytra are blackish and the underside is orange to dark brownish, with brownish to orange legs.
