= Parastasia negrosensis =

Scientific classification
- Kingdom: Animalia
- Phylum: Arthropoda
- Clade: Pancrustacea
- Class: Insecta
- Order: Coleoptera
- Suborder: Polyphaga
- Infraorder: Scarabaeiformia
- Family: Scarabaeidae
- Genus: Parastasia
- Species: P. negrosensis

Binomial name
- Parastasia negrosensis Wada, 1997

Species of beetle

Parastasia negrosensis is a species of beetle of the family Scarabaeidae. It is found in the Philippines (Negros).

== Description ==
Adults reach a length of about 11.9–12.4 mm (0.47–0.49 in). The head and scutellum are black, while the pronotum, elytra, propygidium, pygidium, ventral surface and legs are reddish brown.
