= Parastasia spinosa =

Scientific classification
- Kingdom: Animalia
- Phylum: Arthropoda
- Clade: Pancrustacea
- Class: Insecta
- Order: Coleoptera
- Suborder: Polyphaga
- Infraorder: Scarabaeiformia
- Family: Scarabaeidae
- Genus: Parastasia
- Species: P. spinosa

Binomial name
- Parastasia spinosa Hongsuwong, Sanguansub & Jaitrong, 2022

Species of beetle

Parastasia spinosa is a species of beetle of the family Scarabaeidae. It is found in Thailand.

== Description ==
Adults reach a length of about 12.55 mm (0.494 in). The head and legs are dark brown, while the pronotum, elytra, propygidium, pygidium, and ventral surface are glossy reddish brown. The antennae and scutellum are dark reddish brown.

== Etymology ==
The species name is derived from Latin spinosa (meaning covered with spines) and refers to the median sac of the endophallus which is covered with three different types of spines.
