= Parastasia incurva =

Scientific classification
- Kingdom: Animalia
- Phylum: Arthropoda
- Clade: Pancrustacea
- Class: Insecta
- Order: Coleoptera
- Suborder: Polyphaga
- Infraorder: Scarabaeiformia
- Family: Scarabaeidae
- Genus: Parastasia
- Species: P. incurva

Binomial name
- Parastasia incurva Ohaus, 1923

Species of beetle

Parastasia incurva is a species of beetle of the family Scarabaeidae. It is found in the Philippines (Luzon).

== Description ==
Adults reach a length of about 10.5–11.5 mm (0.41–0.45 in). They are dark reddish black to black with the posterolateral areas of the pronotum orange to yellowish brown, entirely black or reddish brown. The head, a central spot on the pronotum, and the scutellum, spots on the elytra and parts of the underside are all reddish black.
