= Parastasia rufopicta =

Scientific classification
- Kingdom: Animalia
- Phylum: Arthropoda
- Clade: Pancrustacea
- Class: Insecta
- Order: Coleoptera
- Suborder: Polyphaga
- Infraorder: Scarabaeiformia
- Family: Scarabaeidae
- Genus: Parastasia
- Species: P. rufopicta

Binomial name
- Parastasia rufopicta Westwood, 1841

Synonyms
- Parastasia anthracina Ohaus, 1902

Species of beetle

Parastasia rufopicta is a species of beetle of the family Scarabaeidae. It is found in India (Assam, Manipur, Nagaland, West Bengal, Sikkim), Bangladesh, Bhutan and Nepal.

== Description ==
Adults reach a length of about 18–23 mm (0.71–0.91 in). The head is black, while the pronotum and scutellum are red to dark reddish brown or blackish. The elytra are blackish, with a reddish orange transverse band. The underside and legs are dark reddish, and the pygidium is sometimes lighter red.
