= Parastasia carsteni =

Scientific classification
- Kingdom: Animalia
- Phylum: Arthropoda
- Clade: Pancrustacea
- Class: Insecta
- Order: Coleoptera
- Suborder: Polyphaga
- Infraorder: Scarabaeiformia
- Family: Scarabaeidae
- Genus: Parastasia
- Species: P. carsteni

Binomial name
- Parastasia carsteni Wada, 2004

Species of beetle

Parastasia carsteni is a species of beetle of the family Scarabaeidae. It is found in Indonesia (Sulawesi).

== Description ==
Adults reach a length of about 18.8 mm (0.74 in). The head, elytra, legs and ventral surface are black, while the antennae are dark brown to black and the pronotum, propygidium and pygidium reddish orange. The pronotum has a black patch.
