= Parastasia qiului =

Scientific classification
- Kingdom: Animalia
- Phylum: Arthropoda
- Clade: Pancrustacea
- Class: Insecta
- Order: Coleoptera
- Suborder: Polyphaga
- Infraorder: Scarabaeiformia
- Family: Scarabaeidae
- Genus: Parastasia
- Species: P. qiului

Binomial name
- Parastasia qiului Zhao, 2019

Species of beetle

Parastasia qiului is a species of beetle of the family Scarabaeidae. It is found in China (Sichuan).

== Description ==
Adults reach a length of about 15–16 mm (0.59–0.63 in). The body is entirely black, with the pronotum and elytra weakly shining. There is a transverse yellowish brown band on the elytra. The setae and pubescence are brown.

== Etymology ==
The species is named after a friend of the author, Dr. Lu Qiu, who first collected the species.
