= Parastasia pseudorufonigra =

Scientific classification
- Kingdom: Animalia
- Phylum: Arthropoda
- Clade: Pancrustacea
- Class: Insecta
- Order: Coleoptera
- Suborder: Polyphaga
- Infraorder: Scarabaeiformia
- Family: Scarabaeidae
- Genus: Parastasia
- Species: P. pseudorufonigra

Binomial name
- Parastasia pseudorufonigra Wada, 2013

Species of beetle

Parastasia pseudorufonigra is a species of beetle of the family Scarabaeidae. It is found in Malaysia (Sabah).
