= Parastasia stella =

Scientific classification
- Kingdom: Animalia
- Phylum: Arthropoda
- Clade: Pancrustacea
- Class: Insecta
- Order: Coleoptera
- Suborder: Polyphaga
- Infraorder: Scarabaeiformia
- Family: Scarabaeidae
- Genus: Parastasia
- Species: P. stella

Binomial name
- Parastasia stella Kuijten, 1992

Species of beetle

Parastasia stella is a species of beetle of the family Scarabaeidae. It is found in Indonesia (Irian Jaya).

== Description ==
Adults reach a length of about 12.5–13 mm (0.49–0.51 in). The head is dark red to black, the pronotum black with reddish orange areas along the lateral margins or with the orange extended along the anterior margin and in a median, longitudinal band. The scutellum is black and the elytra are black with a discal reddish orange spot. The underside and legs are mostly dark reddish.
