= Parastasia bicolor =

Scientific classification
- Kingdom: Animalia
- Phylum: Arthropoda
- Clade: Pancrustacea
- Class: Insecta
- Order: Coleoptera
- Suborder: Polyphaga
- Infraorder: Scarabaeiformia
- Family: Scarabaeidae
- Genus: Parastasia
- Species: P. bicolor

Binomial name
- Parastasia bicolor Westwood, 1841

Species of beetle

Parastasia bicolor is a species of beetle of the family Scarabaeidae. It is found in Indonesia (Java, Sumatra) and Malaysia.

== Description ==
Adults reach a length of about 13.5–15.5 mm (0.53–0.61 in). The head is black, while the pronotum is reddish orange with darkened anterior and posterior margins. The scutellum is blackish or yellowish brown and the elytra are dark reddish to black. The propygidium is brownish red, the pygidium more orange and the underside dark reddish. The legs are dark reddish.
