= Parastasia oberthueri =

Scientific classification
- Kingdom: Animalia
- Phylum: Arthropoda
- Clade: Pancrustacea
- Class: Insecta
- Order: Coleoptera
- Suborder: Polyphaga
- Infraorder: Scarabaeiformia
- Family: Scarabaeidae
- Genus: Parastasia
- Species: P. oberthueri

Binomial name
- Parastasia oberthueri Ohaus, 1900

Synonyms
- Parastasia oberthuri sakishimana Kobayashi, 1983

Species of beetle

Parastasia oberthueri is a species of beetle of the family Scarabaeidae. It is found in Vietnam, Japan, Taiwan and China (Guangdong, Guangxi).

== Description ==
Adults reach a length of about 12.5–14.5 mm (0.49–0.57 in). The head is reddish black, while the pronotum is yellowish red with some or all margins darkened. The scutellum is dark red to black in females. The elytra are dark reddish black or black, and the pygidium is yellowish red. The rest of the body is dark reddish. In females, the underside and legs are dark reddish.

== Subspecies ==
- Parastasia oberthueri oberthueri (Vietnam, Taiwan, China: Guangdong, Guangxi)
- Parastasia oberthueri ishigakiana Nomura, 1964 (Japan, Taiwan)
