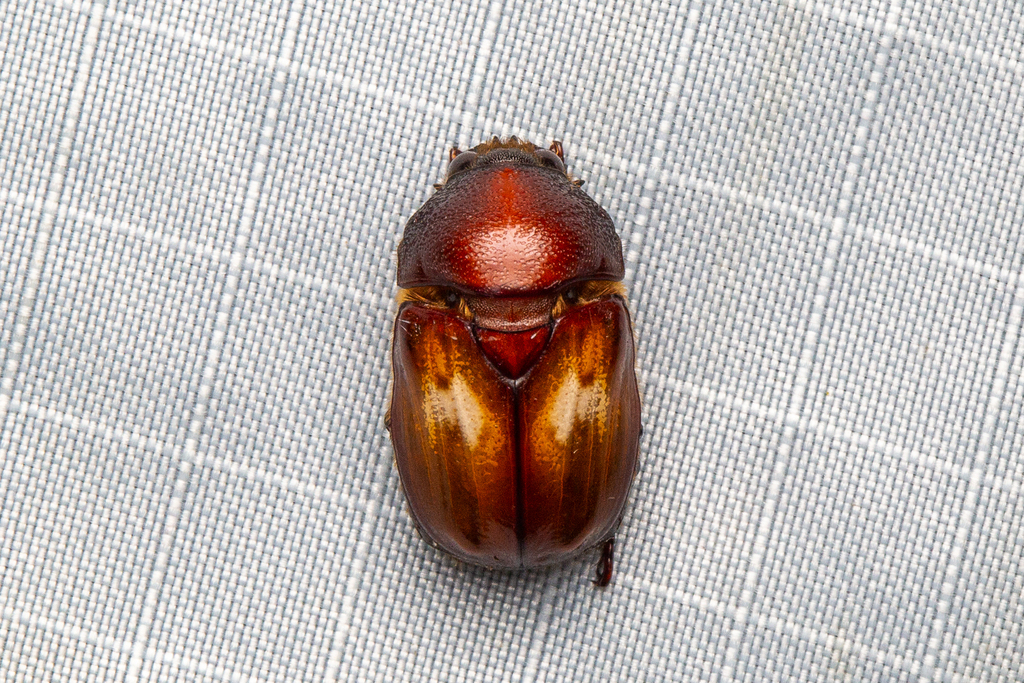

Scientific classification
- Kingdom: Animalia
- Phylum: Arthropoda
- Clade: Pancrustacea
- Class: Insecta
- Order: Coleoptera
- Suborder: Polyphaga
- Infraorder: Scarabaeiformia
- Family: Scarabaeidae
- Genus: Parastasia
- Species: P. confluens

Binomial name
- Parastasia confluens Westwood, 1841

Synonyms
- Parastasia degenerata Snellen Van Vollenhoven, 1864; Parastasia pileus Snellen Van Vollenhoven, 1864; Parastasia rugosicollis Blanchard, 1851

= Parastasia confluens =

Species of beetle

Parastasia confluens is a species of beetle of the family Scarabaeidae. It is found in India (Andaman and Nicobar Islands), Indonesia (Aru, Sumatra, Java, Sulawesi, Saleyer, Sangir, Batjan, Ambon, Seram, Ternate), Malaysia (including Sarawak), the Philippines (Luzon) and Papua New Guinea.

== Description ==
Adults reach a length of about 19 mm (0.75 in). They are completely dark reddish black, with the underside and legs somewhat lighter.
