= Parastasia jamesonae =

Scientific classification
- Kingdom: Animalia
- Phylum: Arthropoda
- Clade: Pancrustacea
- Class: Insecta
- Order: Coleoptera
- Suborder: Polyphaga
- Infraorder: Scarabaeiformia
- Family: Scarabaeidae
- Genus: Parastasia
- Species: P. jamesonae

Binomial name
- Parastasia jamesonae Wada, 2008

Species of beetle

Parastasia jamesonae is a species of beetle of the family Scarabaeidae. It is found in the Philippines (Negros).

== Description ==
Adults reach a length of about 9.4 mm (0.37 in). The dorsal surface is dark brown to black, but the propygidium, pygidium, legs and ventral surface are dark reddish brown to black.

== Etymology ==
The species is named for Dr. Mary Liz Jameson, who first mentioned the species (as Parastasia sp. near. P. nitidula).
