= Parastasia aberrans =

Scientific classification
- Kingdom: Animalia
- Phylum: Arthropoda
- Clade: Pancrustacea
- Class: Insecta
- Order: Coleoptera
- Suborder: Polyphaga
- Infraorder: Scarabaeiformia
- Family: Scarabaeidae
- Genus: Parastasia
- Species: P. aberrans

Binomial name
- Parastasia aberrans Kuijten, 1992

Species of beetle

Parastasia aberrans is a species of beetle of the family Scarabaeidae. It is found in Indonesia (Sulawesi, Java).

== Description ==
Adults reach a length of about 16 mm (0.63 in). They have a black head and a reddish pronotum, while the elytra and legs are reddish black. The underside is slightly less dark than the elytra.
