= Parastasia quadrimaculata =

Scientific classification
- Kingdom: Animalia
- Phylum: Arthropoda
- Clade: Pancrustacea
- Class: Insecta
- Order: Coleoptera
- Suborder: Polyphaga
- Infraorder: Scarabaeiformia
- Family: Scarabaeidae
- Genus: Parastasia
- Species: P. quadrimaculata

Binomial name
- Parastasia quadrimaculata Ohaus, 1900

Species of beetle

Parastasia quadrimaculata is a species of beetle of the family Scarabaeidae. It is found in Indonesia (Sumatra, Java).

== Description ==
Adults reach a length of about 13–17.5 mm (0.51–0.69 in). The head is reddish brown to black, while the rest of the body is reddish to variably dark reddish brown, but with the elytra light brown to dark reddish brown, each with a small yellowish brown to red spot. Females are dark reddish brown to nearly black, but the elytra has yellowish to reddish brown areas in the anterior half.
