= Parastasia sulcata =

Scientific classification
- Kingdom: Animalia
- Phylum: Arthropoda
- Clade: Pancrustacea
- Class: Insecta
- Order: Coleoptera
- Suborder: Polyphaga
- Infraorder: Scarabaeiformia
- Family: Scarabaeidae
- Genus: Parastasia
- Species: P. sulcata

Binomial name
- Parastasia sulcata Ohaus, 1911

Species of beetle

Parastasia sulcata is a species of beetle of the family Scarabaeidae. It is found in Indonesia (Buru).

== Description ==
Adults reach a length of about 15 mm (0.59 in). The head is black, while the scutellum, elytra and tergites are very dark reddish and the pronotum slightly less dark. The underside and legs are reddish brown.
