= Parastasia terraereginae =

Scientific classification
- Kingdom: Animalia
- Phylum: Arthropoda
- Clade: Pancrustacea
- Class: Insecta
- Order: Coleoptera
- Suborder: Polyphaga
- Infraorder: Scarabaeiformia
- Family: Scarabaeidae
- Genus: Parastasia
- Species: P. terraereginae

Binomial name
- Parastasia terraereginae Kuijten, 1992

Species of beetle

Parastasia terraereginae is a species of beetle of the family Scarabaeidae. It is found in Australia (Queensland).

== Description ==
Adults reach a length of about 9.8–13 mm (0.39–0.51 in). The head is dark reddish to black, while the pronotum is dark reddish to black, with the lateral areas yellowish brown to orange and with blackened margins. The rest of the dorsal surface is dark reddish to black and the underside and legs are dark reddish brown. Females are reddish black or black dorsally and the underside and legs are dark reddish brown.
