= Parastasia binotata =

Scientific classification
- Kingdom: Animalia
- Phylum: Arthropoda
- Clade: Pancrustacea
- Class: Insecta
- Order: Coleoptera
- Suborder: Polyphaga
- Infraorder: Scarabaeiformia
- Family: Scarabaeidae
- Genus: Parastasia
- Species: P. binotata

Binomial name
- Parastasia binotata Westwood, 1841

Synonyms
- Parastasia horsfieldii Westwood, 1841

Species of beetle

Parastasia binotata is a species of beetle of the family Scarabaeidae. It is found in Indonesia (Java).

== Description ==
Adults reach a length of about 16–20 mm (0.63–0.79 in). They are completely dark reddish to black, with the elytra often a bit lighter than the rest of the body. Females have a reddish to orange spot on each elytron, which is bordered by black in specimens with reddish elytra.
