= Parastasia bigibbosa =

Scientific classification
- Kingdom: Animalia
- Phylum: Arthropoda
- Clade: Pancrustacea
- Class: Insecta
- Order: Coleoptera
- Suborder: Polyphaga
- Infraorder: Scarabaeiformia
- Family: Scarabaeidae
- Genus: Parastasia
- Species: P. bigibbosa

Binomial name
- Parastasia bigibbosa Nonfried, 1891

Synonyms
- Subpeltonotus andamanae Ghai, Chandra & Ramamurthy, 1988; Parastasia sulcicollis Ohaus, 1911

Species of beetle

Parastasia bigibbosa is a species of beetle of the family Scarabaeidae. It is found in India (Andaman and Nicobar Islands) and Thailand.

== Description ==
Adults reach a length of about 14.5–16 mm (0.57–0.63 in). They are entirely dark reddish.
