= Parastasia hainanensis =

Scientific classification
- Kingdom: Animalia
- Phylum: Arthropoda
- Clade: Pancrustacea
- Class: Insecta
- Order: Coleoptera
- Suborder: Polyphaga
- Infraorder: Scarabaeiformia
- Family: Scarabaeidae
- Genus: Parastasia
- Species: P. hainanensis

Binomial name
- Parastasia hainanensis Wada, 2009

Species of beetle

Parastasia hainanensis is a species of beetle of the family Scarabaeidae. It is found in China (Hainan).

== Description ==
Adults reach a length of about 13.7 mm (0.54 in). The antennae, head, legs and ventral surface are dark reddish brown to black, while the dorsal surface (except the head) is dark orange.

== Etymology ==
The species name refers to the type locality, Hainan Island.
