= Parastasia akebono =

Scientific classification
- Kingdom: Animalia
- Phylum: Arthropoda
- Clade: Pancrustacea
- Class: Insecta
- Order: Coleoptera
- Suborder: Polyphaga
- Infraorder: Scarabaeiformia
- Family: Scarabaeidae
- Genus: Parastasia
- Species: P. akebono

Binomial name
- Parastasia akebono Wada, 2013

Species of beetle

Parastasia akebono is a species of beetle of the family Scarabaeidae. It is found in India (Arunachal Pradesh).
