= Parastasia pascoei =

Scientific classification
- Kingdom: Animalia
- Phylum: Arthropoda
- Clade: Pancrustacea
- Class: Insecta
- Order: Coleoptera
- Suborder: Polyphaga
- Infraorder: Scarabaeiformia
- Family: Scarabaeidae
- Genus: Parastasia
- Species: P. pascoei

Binomial name
- Parastasia pascoei (Waterhouse, 1895)

Synonyms
- Echmatophorus pascoei Waterhouse, 1895

Species of beetle

Parastasia pascoei is a species of beetle of the family Scarabaeidae. It is found in Malaysia.

== Description ==
Adults reach a length of about 13–16 mm (0.51–0.63 in). The head is blackish, while the pronotum is reddish or brownish orange with the anterior and posterior margins blackened and with a large, black area. The scutellum is black and the elytra are light reddish brown. The propygidium and pygidium are yellowish orange, the latter with a brown spot. The underside and legs are brownish black.
