= Parastasia indica =

Scientific classification
- Kingdom: Animalia
- Phylum: Arthropoda
- Clade: Pancrustacea
- Class: Insecta
- Order: Coleoptera
- Suborder: Polyphaga
- Infraorder: Scarabaeiformia
- Family: Scarabaeidae
- Genus: Parastasia
- Species: P. indica

Binomial name
- Parastasia indica Ohaus, 1898

Synonyms
- Parastasia fruhstorferi Ohaus, 1902

Species of beetle

Parastasia indica is a species of beetle of the family Scarabaeidae. It is found in Laos, Thailand, Vietnam, Bhutan, China (Fujian, Guangdong, Guangxi, Yunnan) and India (Sikkim).

== Description ==
Adults reach a length of about 8.5–11.5 mm (0.33–0.45 in). They are completely dark reddish black or black, with the posterolateral area of the pronotum reddish orange. Other specimens have a dark reddish head, the pronotum yellowish to dark red and have the posterolateral areas somewhat lighter. The underside, legs and elytra are reddish, the latter sometimes with darkened margins.
