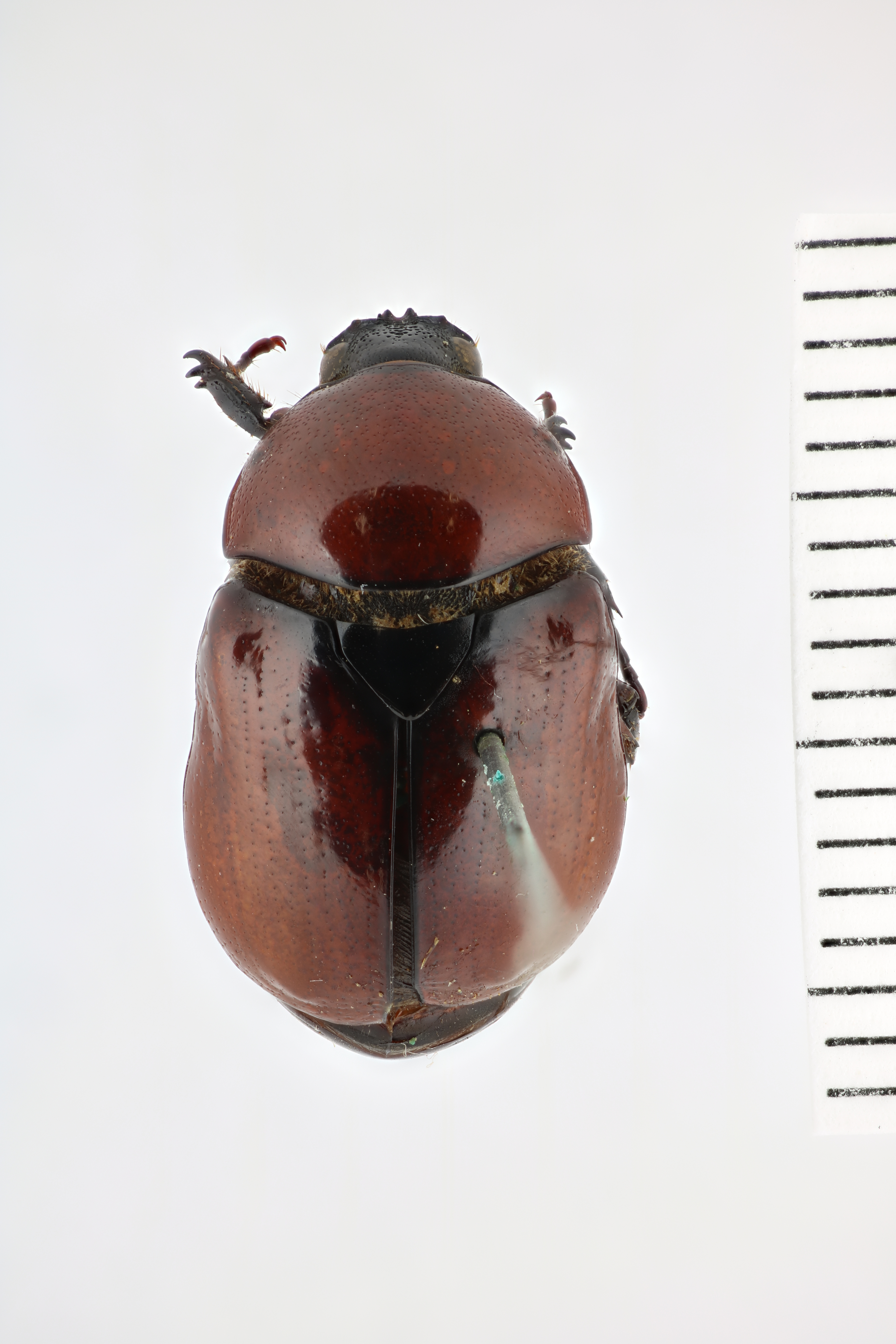

Scientific classification
- Kingdom: Animalia
- Phylum: Arthropoda
- Clade: Pancrustacea
- Class: Insecta
- Order: Coleoptera
- Suborder: Polyphaga
- Infraorder: Scarabaeiformia
- Family: Scarabaeidae
- Genus: Parastasia
- Species: P. discolor

Binomial name
- Parastasia discolor Westwood, 1841

Synonyms
- Parastasia unicolor Arrow, 1899; Parastasia scutellaris Erichson, 1845; Parastasia mirabilis Arrow, 1899

= Parastasia discolor =

Species of beetle

Parastasia discolor is a species of beetle of the family Scarabaeidae. It is found in Indonesia (Java, Sumatra), Brunei, Malaysia (mainland, Sabah, Sarawak), the Philippines (Luzon, Mindanao) and Thailand.

== Description ==
Adults reach a length of about 11.5–19.5 mm (0.45–0.77 in). In males, the head is dark brown to black, while the dorsal surface is reddish or yellowish brown. The anterior and posterior margins of the pronotum, the margins of the scutellum and the base and suture of the elytra are sometimes darkened, and this dark area sometimes coveres most of the scutellum and elytra. There are also specimens with entirely black elytra. The underside and legs are dark reddish to blackish. Females are blackish or reddish black.

== Subspecies ==
- Parastasia discolor discolor (Brunei; Indonesia: Java, Sumatra; Malaysia: mainland, Sabah, Sarawak; Philippines: Luzon, Mindanao)
- Parastasia discolor scutellaris Erichson, 1845 (Indonesia: Sumatra; Thailand)
