= Parastasia diversipennis =

Scientific classification
- Kingdom: Animalia
- Phylum: Arthropoda
- Clade: Pancrustacea
- Class: Insecta
- Order: Coleoptera
- Suborder: Polyphaga
- Infraorder: Scarabaeiformia
- Family: Scarabaeidae
- Genus: Parastasia
- Species: P. diversipennis

Binomial name
- Parastasia diversipennis Ohaus, 1911

Species of beetle

Parastasia diversipennis is a species of beetle of the family Scarabaeidae. It is found in Malaysia (mainland, Sabah).

== Description ==
Adults reach a length of about 15–17 mm (0.59–0.67 in). The head is dark reddish to black, while the pronotum is yellowish or reddish brown, with a reddish brown to blackish area. The scutellum, elytra and legs are yellowish brown to dark chestnut brown. The underside is dark reddish brown to blackish.
