= Parastasia lobata =

Scientific classification
- Kingdom: Animalia
- Phylum: Arthropoda
- Clade: Pancrustacea
- Class: Insecta
- Order: Coleoptera
- Suborder: Polyphaga
- Infraorder: Scarabaeiformia
- Family: Scarabaeidae
- Genus: Parastasia
- Species: P. lobata

Binomial name
- Parastasia lobata Kuijten, 1992

Species of beetle

Parastasia lobata is a species of beetle of the family Scarabaeidae. It is found in Sri Lanka.

== Description ==
Adults reach a length of about 12.5–14.5 mm (0.49–0.57 in). The head is black, while the pronotum is brownish orange, with darkened anterior and posterior margins. The scutellum is reddish black and the elytra are brownish orange. Most of the underside and the legs are dark reddish to blackish.
