= Parastasia yasutoshii =

Scientific classification
- Kingdom: Animalia
- Phylum: Arthropoda
- Clade: Pancrustacea
- Class: Insecta
- Order: Coleoptera
- Suborder: Polyphaga
- Infraorder: Scarabaeiformia
- Family: Scarabaeidae
- Genus: Parastasia
- Species: P. yasutoshii

Binomial name
- Parastasia yasutoshii Wada, 2008

Species of beetle

Parastasia yasutoshii is a species of beetle of the family Scarabaeidae. It is found in Malaysia (Sabah).

== Description ==
Adults reach a length of about 10–10.2 mm (0.39–0.40 in). The antennae, pronotum, scutellum, basal area of the elytra and ventral surface are reddish brown, while the head and the rest of the elytra and legs are dark red to dark brown. The propygidium and pygidium are dark brown to black.
