= Parastasia novoguineensis =

Scientific classification
- Kingdom: Animalia
- Phylum: Arthropoda
- Clade: Pancrustacea
- Class: Insecta
- Order: Coleoptera
- Suborder: Polyphaga
- Infraorder: Scarabaeiformia
- Family: Scarabaeidae
- Genus: Parastasia
- Species: P. novoguineensis

Binomial name
- Parastasia novoguineensis Ohaus, 1898

Synonyms
- Parastasia gymnopleuridis Prokofiev, 2012; Parastasia assimilis Ohaus, 1901

Species of beetle

Parastasia novoguineensis is a species of beetle of the family Scarabaeidae. It is found in Indonesia (Irian Jaya) and on the Solomon Islands.

== Description ==
Adults reach a length of about 12–14 mm (0.47–0.55 in). The head is dark reddish to nearly black. The discal area of the pronotum is dark red, with a somewhat lighter longitudinal band, and yellowish orange with a dark spot laterally. The scutellum and elytra are dark red, the propygidium reddish, the pygidium red to black with a yellowish band along the lateral margins, and the underside and legs are reddish.
