= Parastasia seramensis =

Scientific classification
- Kingdom: Animalia
- Phylum: Arthropoda
- Clade: Pancrustacea
- Class: Insecta
- Order: Coleoptera
- Suborder: Polyphaga
- Infraorder: Scarabaeiformia
- Family: Scarabaeidae
- Genus: Parastasia
- Species: P. seramensis

Binomial name
- Parastasia seramensis Wada, 2016

Species of beetle

Parastasia seramensis is a species of beetle of the family Scarabaeidae. It is found in Indonesia (Seram).

== Description ==
Adults reach a length of about 10.6 mm (0.42 in). The antennae and head are dark reddish brown to dark brown, while the dorsal surface, legs and ventral surface are yellowish orange to dark red.

== Etymology ==
The species is named after the type locality, Seram Island.
