= Parastasia asahi =

Scientific classification
- Kingdom: Animalia
- Phylum: Arthropoda
- Clade: Pancrustacea
- Class: Insecta
- Order: Coleoptera
- Suborder: Polyphaga
- Infraorder: Scarabaeiformia
- Family: Scarabaeidae
- Genus: Parastasia
- Species: P. asahi

Binomial name
- Parastasia asahi Wada, 2008

Species of beetle

Parastasia asahi is a species of beetle of the family Scarabaeidae. It is found in Malaysia (Sabah) and Thailand.

== Description ==
Adults reach a length of about 13.57–15.3 mm (0.534–0.602 in). The antennae and head are reddish brown to dark brown, while the rest of the dorsal surface, ventral surface and legs are dark orange to reddish brown.
