= Parastasia christmasensis =

Scientific classification
- Kingdom: Animalia
- Phylum: Arthropoda
- Clade: Pancrustacea
- Class: Insecta
- Order: Coleoptera
- Suborder: Polyphaga
- Infraorder: Scarabaeiformia
- Family: Scarabaeidae
- Genus: Parastasia
- Species: P. christmasensis

Binomial name
- Parastasia christmasensis Wada, 2008

Species of beetle

Parastasia christmasensis is a species of beetle of the family Scarabaeidae. It is found in Australia (Christmas Island).

== Description ==
Adults reach a length of about 19.3 mm (0.76 in). The antennae and head are dark reddish brown, while the pronotum, scutellum, elytra and legs are reddish brown. The propygidium and pygidium are yellowish brown. The pronotum has a marginal, yellowish brown band, the propygidium has two apical reddish brown bands and the pygidium has two reddjsh brown areas at the sides.

== Etymology ==
The species name is derived from the type locality, Christmas Island.
