= Parastasia circumferens =

Scientific classification
- Kingdom: Animalia
- Phylum: Arthropoda
- Clade: Pancrustacea
- Class: Insecta
- Order: Coleoptera
- Suborder: Polyphaga
- Infraorder: Scarabaeiformia
- Family: Scarabaeidae
- Genus: Parastasia
- Species: P. circumferens

Binomial name
- Parastasia circumferens Arrow, 1899

Species of beetle

Parastasia circumferens is a species of beetle of the family Scarabaeidae. It is found in Indonesia (Kalimantan) and Malaysia.

== Description ==
Adults reach a length of about 19 mm (0.75 in). They are completely dark reddish black, with the underside and legs somewhat lighter.
