= Parastasia mitsumata =

Scientific classification
- Kingdom: Animalia
- Phylum: Arthropoda
- Clade: Pancrustacea
- Class: Insecta
- Order: Coleoptera
- Suborder: Polyphaga
- Infraorder: Scarabaeiformia
- Family: Scarabaeidae
- Genus: Parastasia
- Species: P. mitsumata

Binomial name
- Parastasia mitsumata Wada, 2007

Species of beetle

Parastasia mitsumata is a species of beetle of the family Scarabaeidae. It is found in the Philippines (Mindanao).

== Description ==
Adults reach a length of about 18–20.5 mm (0.71–0.81 in). The head and elytra are black, while the pronotum is red to black and the antennae, propygidium, pygidium and ventral surface are reddish brown to blackish brown. The elytra have zigzag orange patches, as well as elongate orange patches.
