= Parastasia takahikoi =

Scientific classification
- Kingdom: Animalia
- Phylum: Arthropoda
- Clade: Pancrustacea
- Class: Insecta
- Order: Coleoptera
- Suborder: Polyphaga
- Infraorder: Scarabaeiformia
- Family: Scarabaeidae
- Genus: Parastasia
- Species: P. takahikoi

Binomial name
- Parastasia takahikoi Wada, 2007

Species of beetle

Parastasia takahikoi is a species of beetle of the family Scarabaeidae. It is found in Malaysia (Sabah).

== Description ==
Adults reach a length of about 18.7–23.4 mm (0.74–0.92 in). The antennae, dorsal surface, legs and ventral surface are reddish brown to dark reddish brown and the elytra have a vague, basal orange area.
