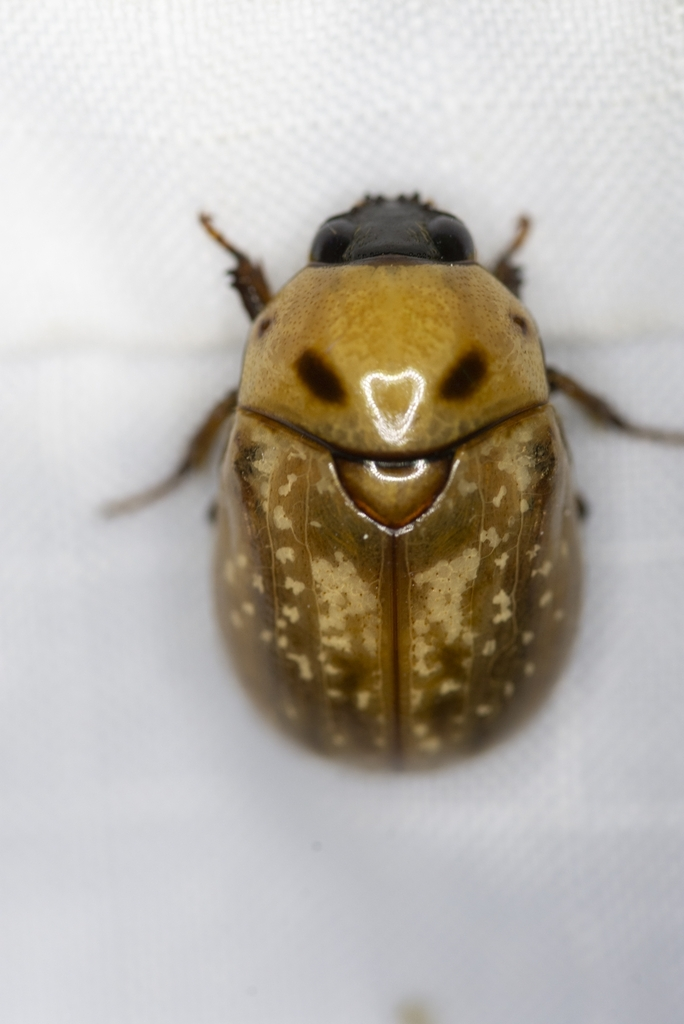

Scientific classification
- Kingdom: Animalia
- Phylum: Arthropoda
- Clade: Pancrustacea
- Class: Insecta
- Order: Coleoptera
- Suborder: Polyphaga
- Infraorder: Scarabaeiformia
- Family: Scarabaeidae
- Genus: Parastasia
- Species: P. nigriceps

Binomial name
- Parastasia nigriceps Westwood, 1841

Synonyms
- Parastasia guttulata Fairmaire, 1883; Parastasia inconstans Fairmaire, 1879; Parastasia medvedevi Prokofiev, 2012

= Parastasia nigriceps =

Species of beetle

Parastasia nigriceps is a species of beetle of the family Scarabaeidae. It is found in the Philippines.

== Description ==
Adults reach a length of about 10.5–16 mm (0.41–0.63 in). The head is black, while the pronotum is yellowish brown to reddish orange, with two large black spots. The scutellum is yellowish to reddish brown and the elytra are yellowish or reddish brown, with lighter spots. The propygidium and pygidium are yellowish to reddish brown and the underside and legs are roughly the same colour as the dorsal surface.

== Subspecies ==
- Parastasia nigriceps nigriceps (Philippines)
- Parastasia nigriceps inconstans Fairmaire, 1879 (Philippines)
