= Parastasia maluku =

Scientific classification
- Kingdom: Animalia
- Phylum: Arthropoda
- Clade: Pancrustacea
- Class: Insecta
- Order: Coleoptera
- Suborder: Polyphaga
- Infraorder: Scarabaeiformia
- Family: Scarabaeidae
- Genus: Parastasia
- Species: P. maluku

Binomial name
- Parastasia maluku Kuijten, 1992

Species of beetle

Parastasia maluku is a species of beetle of the family Scarabaeidae. It is found in Indonesia (Moluccas).

== Description ==
Adults reach a length of about 15 mm (0.59 in). The head is black and the rest of the body is yellowish brown with various dark brown markings.
