= Parastasia moultoni =

Scientific classification
- Kingdom: Animalia
- Phylum: Arthropoda
- Clade: Pancrustacea
- Class: Insecta
- Order: Coleoptera
- Suborder: Polyphaga
- Infraorder: Scarabaeiformia
- Family: Scarabaeidae
- Genus: Parastasia
- Species: P. moultoni

Binomial name
- Parastasia moultoni Ohaus, 1911

Species of beetle

Parastasia moultoni is a species of beetle of the family Scarabaeidae. It is found in Indonesia (Kalimantan) and Malaysia (Sarawak).

== Description ==
Adults reach a length of about 9–11.5 mm (0.35–0.45 in). They are completely black, with the lateral areas of the pronotum brownish orange or reddish. The underside and legs are dark reddish.
