= Parastasia burmeisteri =

Scientific classification
- Kingdom: Animalia
- Phylum: Arthropoda
- Clade: Pancrustacea
- Class: Insecta
- Order: Coleoptera
- Suborder: Polyphaga
- Infraorder: Scarabaeiformia
- Family: Scarabaeidae
- Genus: Parastasia
- Species: P. burmeisteri

Binomial name
- Parastasia burmeisteri Ohaus, 1898

Synonyms
- Parastasia nonfriedi Ohaus, 1898

Species of beetle

Parastasia burmeisteri is a species of beetle of the family Scarabaeidae. It is found in Indonesia (Sumatra, Java), Malaysia (including Sabah), the Philippines and Thailand.

== Description ==
Adults reach a length of about 9–10.5 mm (0.35–0.41 in). The head of the males is dark reddish brown, while it is entirely black in most females. The male pronotum is brownish yellow, sometimes with some darker areas. In females, the pronotum is brownish yellow laterally, with a dark brown to blackish median band. The scutellum is brownish yellow in males and dark brown to black in females. In males, the elytra are more brownish than the pronotum and have a darker brown spot. In females, the elytra are dark brown to blackish with a small brownish yellow area, as well as a sickle-shaped spot. The rest of the body is reddish brown to yellowish brown.
