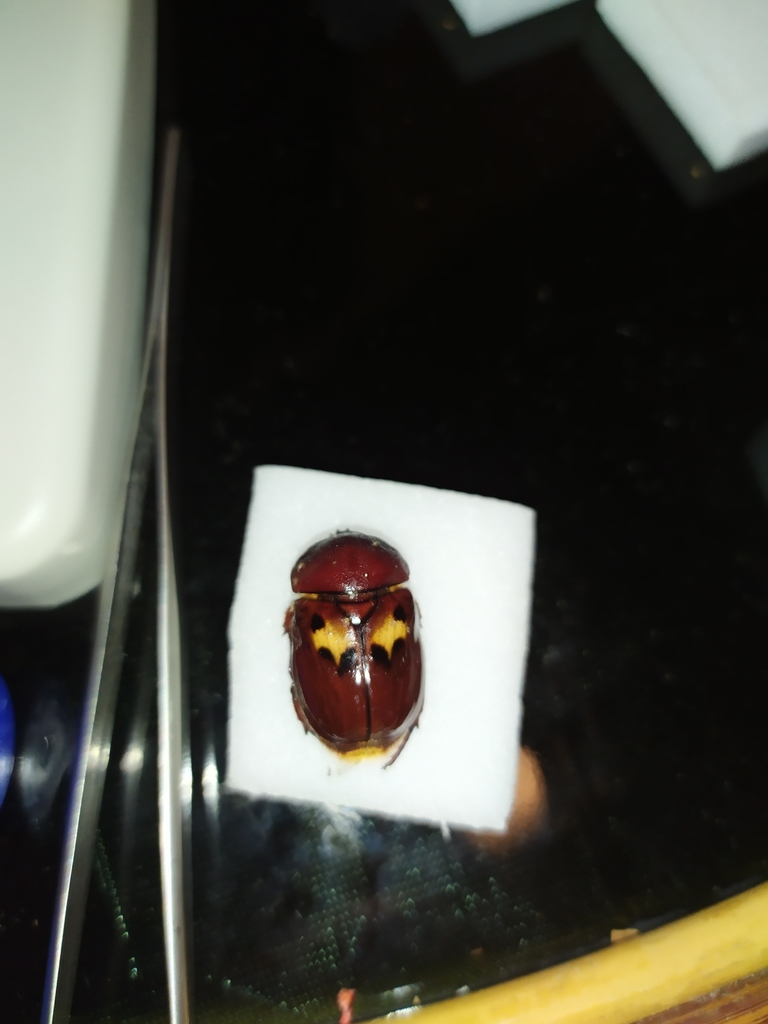

Scientific classification
- Kingdom: Animalia
- Phylum: Arthropoda
- Clade: Pancrustacea
- Class: Insecta
- Order: Coleoptera
- Suborder: Polyphaga
- Infraorder: Scarabaeiformia
- Family: Scarabaeidae
- Genus: Parastasia
- Species: P. moseri

Binomial name
- Parastasia moseri Ohaus, 1903

Synonyms
- Parastasia ignorata Ohaus, 1911; Parastasia piligera Ohaus, 1911

= Parastasia moseri =

Species of beetle

Parastasia moseri is a species of beetle of the family Scarabaeidae. It is found in Indonesia (Kalimantan) and Malaysia (Sabah).

== Description ==
Adults reach a length of about 17–23.5 mm (0.67–0.93 in). The head is dark red to blackish, while the pronotum is red to reddish brown, with some slightly darker spots. The scutellum and elytra are reddish brown, while the underside is blackish brown and the legs are reddish brown.
