= Parastasia anomala =

Scientific classification
- Kingdom: Animalia
- Phylum: Arthropoda
- Clade: Pancrustacea
- Class: Insecta
- Order: Coleoptera
- Suborder: Polyphaga
- Infraorder: Scarabaeiformia
- Family: Scarabaeidae
- Genus: Parastasia
- Species: P. anomala

Binomial name
- Parastasia anomala Arrow, 1899

Species of beetle

Parastasia anomala is a species of beetle of the family Scarabaeidae. It is found in Indonesia (Sumatra), Malaysia (including Sabah) and Thailand.

== Description ==
Adults reach a length of about 11.5–13.8 mm (0.45–0.54 in). In males, the head is black, sometimes with a reddish central area. The pronotum is reddish orange to dark reddish brown and the scutellum is black. The elytra, propygidium and pygidium are reddish to black and the underside is either reddish, or partly or entirely black. The legs are red with large black areas. Females are ferrugineous, with the head, a band along the anterior margin of the pronotum and scutellum dark reddish brown.
