= Parastasia gestroi =

Scientific classification
- Kingdom: Animalia
- Phylum: Arthropoda
- Clade: Pancrustacea
- Class: Insecta
- Order: Coleoptera
- Suborder: Polyphaga
- Infraorder: Scarabaeiformia
- Family: Scarabaeidae
- Genus: Parastasia
- Species: P. gestroi

Binomial name
- Parastasia gestroi Ohaus, 1900

Synonyms
- Parastasia rubella Ohaus, 1926

Species of beetle

Parastasia gestroi is a species of beetle of the family Scarabaeidae. It is found in Malaysia (Sarawak).

== Description ==
Adults reach a length of about 10–12 mm (0.39–0.47 in). The head is blackish, while the pronotum is brownish or reddish orange sometimes with a brownish black area. The scutellum is brown or black, while the elytra are reddish brown, sometimes with a dark red or black area and bands along the margins. The underside is dark reddish brown or blackish.
