= Parastasia dolens =

Scientific classification
- Kingdom: Animalia
- Phylum: Arthropoda
- Clade: Pancrustacea
- Class: Insecta
- Order: Coleoptera
- Suborder: Polyphaga
- Infraorder: Scarabaeiformia
- Family: Scarabaeidae
- Genus: Parastasia
- Species: P. dolens

Binomial name
- Parastasia dolens Fairmaire, 1879

Synonyms
- Parastasia vitiensis Nonfried, 1891

Species of beetle

Parastasia dolens is a species of beetle of the family Scarabaeidae. It is found on Fiji.

== Description ==
Adults reach a length of about 9.5–15 mm (0.37–0.59 in). In males, the head is reddish to black, while the pronotum is reddish orange to dark reddish, with black bands. The scutellum and elytra are reddish to black and the underside and legs are reddish brown to blackish. Females are entirely black.
