= Parastasia pulupuluensis =

Scientific classification
- Kingdom: Animalia
- Phylum: Arthropoda
- Clade: Pancrustacea
- Class: Insecta
- Order: Coleoptera
- Suborder: Polyphaga
- Infraorder: Scarabaeiformia
- Family: Scarabaeidae
- Genus: Parastasia
- Species: P. pulupuluensis

Binomial name
- Parastasia pulupuluensis Wada & Muramoto, 1999

Species of beetle

Parastasia pulupuluensis is a species of beetle of the family Scarabaeidae. It is found in Indonesia (Sulawesi).

== Description ==
Adults reach a length of about 19.5–20.7 mm (0.77–0.81 in). The antennae and margins of the pronotum are light reddish brown, while the head, anterior margins of the elytra, and legs are reddish brown to black. The pronotum, scutellum, elytra, propygidium, pygidium and ventral surface are yellowish brown to orange.
