= Parastasia peterzorni =

Scientific classification
- Kingdom: Animalia
- Phylum: Arthropoda
- Clade: Pancrustacea
- Class: Insecta
- Order: Coleoptera
- Suborder: Polyphaga
- Infraorder: Scarabaeiformia
- Family: Scarabaeidae
- Genus: Parastasia
- Species: P. peterzorni

Binomial name
- Parastasia peterzorni Wada, 2008

Species of beetle

Parastasia peterzorni is a species of beetle of the family Scarabaeidae. It is found in Indonesia (Sumatra).

== Description ==
Adults reach a length of about 12.8–16.1 mm (0.50–0.63 in). The head is dark brown to black, while the antennae, dorsal surface, most of the legs and ventral surface are reddish brown to dark reddish brown. The elytra have vague orange patches in males. In females, the head, pronotum and pygidium are dark reddish brown to dark brown, while the clypeus, elytra, propygidium, legs and ventral surface are reddish brown to dark reddish brown.

== Etymology ==
The species is named for Peter Zorn, who first collected the species.
