= Parastasia westwoodi =

Scientific classification
- Kingdom: Animalia
- Phylum: Arthropoda
- Clade: Pancrustacea
- Class: Insecta
- Order: Coleoptera
- Suborder: Polyphaga
- Infraorder: Scarabaeiformia
- Family: Scarabaeidae
- Genus: Parastasia
- Species: P. westwoodi

Binomial name
- Parastasia westwoodi Westwood, 1841

Synonyms
- Parastasia sordida Sharp, 1881; Parastasia obscura Guérin-Ménéville, 1843

Species of beetle

Parastasia westwoodi is a species of beetle of the family Scarabaeidae. It is found in Indonesia (Sumatra, Java), Malaysia (mainland, Sabah), the Philippines (Luzon, Mindoro, Mindanao) and Thailand.

== Description ==
Adults reach a length of about 10–12.5 mm (0.39–0.49 in). The head is dark brown to blackish, while the pronotum is brown to reddish brown, sometimes with a darker pattern. The elytra are brown to reddish brown, with a vague darker area. The underside and legs are dark brown to reddish brown.
