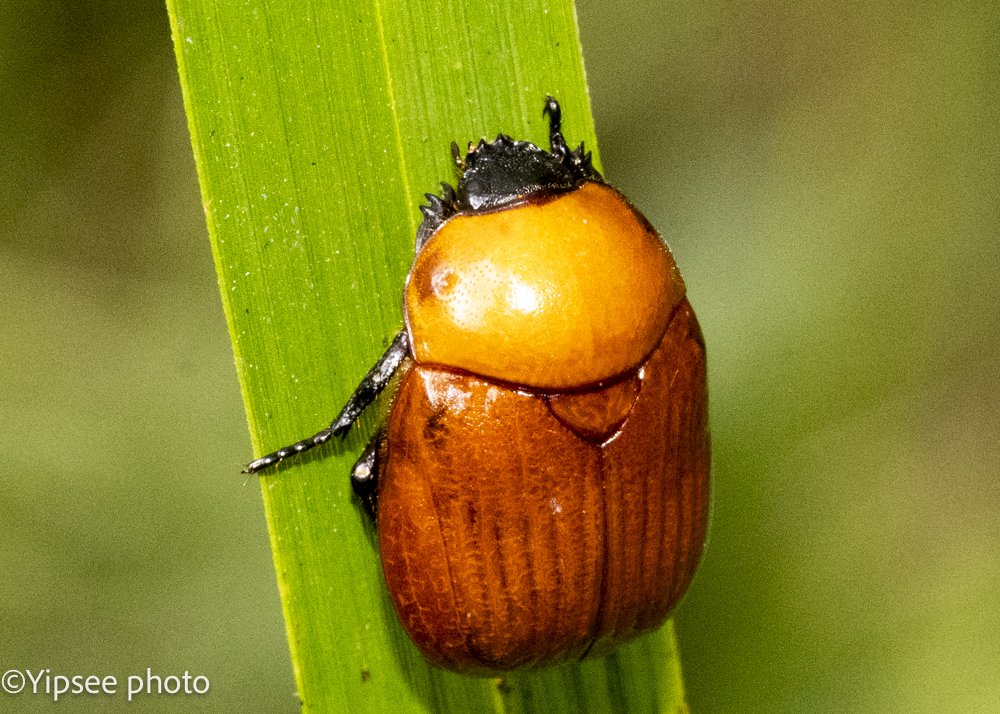

Scientific classification
- Kingdom: Animalia
- Phylum: Arthropoda
- Clade: Pancrustacea
- Class: Insecta
- Order: Coleoptera
- Suborder: Polyphaga
- Infraorder: Scarabaeiformia
- Family: Scarabaeidae
- Genus: Parastasia
- Species: P. sulcipennis

Binomial name
- Parastasia sulcipennis Gestro, 1888

= Parastasia sulcipennis =

Species of beetle

Parastasia sulcipennis is a species of beetle of the family Scarabaeidae. It is found in India (West Bengal), Myanmar and Thailand.

== Description ==
Adults reach a length of about 14.5–16.5 mm (0.57–0.65 in). The head is blackish, while the rest of the dorsal surface is reddish brown. The underside and legs are darker reddish brown to reddish black. Females also have a blackish head, but the rest of the dorsal surface is reddish brown or slightly more yellowish and the underside and legs are dark reddish to reddish black.
