= Parastasia alternata =

Scientific classification
- Kingdom: Animalia
- Phylum: Arthropoda
- Clade: Pancrustacea
- Class: Insecta
- Order: Coleoptera
- Suborder: Polyphaga
- Infraorder: Scarabaeiformia
- Family: Scarabaeidae
- Genus: Parastasia
- Species: P. alternata

Binomial name
- Parastasia alternata Arrow, 1899

Species of beetle

Parastasia alternata is a species of beetle of the family Scarabaeidae. It is found in India (Assam, Sikkim), Bhutan and China (Xizang).

== Description ==
Adults reach a length of about 15–23 mm (0.59–0.91 in). The head is black, while the pronotum is reddish to brownish orange with some or all margins dark red to blackish. The scutellum and anterior area of the elytra are blackish, while the rest of the elytra, as well as the propygidium and pygidium are orange to dark reddish brown. The underside and legs are dark brown or black.
