= Parastasia andamanica =

Scientific classification
- Kingdom: Animalia
- Phylum: Arthropoda
- Clade: Pancrustacea
- Class: Insecta
- Order: Coleoptera
- Suborder: Polyphaga
- Infraorder: Scarabaeiformia
- Family: Scarabaeidae
- Genus: Parastasia
- Species: P. andamanica

Binomial name
- Parastasia andamanica Ohaus, 1898

Species of beetle

Parastasia andamanica is a species of beetle of the family Scarabaeidae. It is found in India (Andaman Islands).

== Description ==
Adults reach a length of about 11–17 mm (0.43–0.67 in). In males, the head is dark red to black, with the clypeus somewhat lighter. The pronotum is ferrugineous, with darker margins. The scutellum is somewhat darker than the pronotum. The elytra brownish red, with a vague pattern of lighter areas. The underside and legs are dark reddish to reddish brown. Females are dark reddish brown to blackish, with yellowish spots on the elytra.
