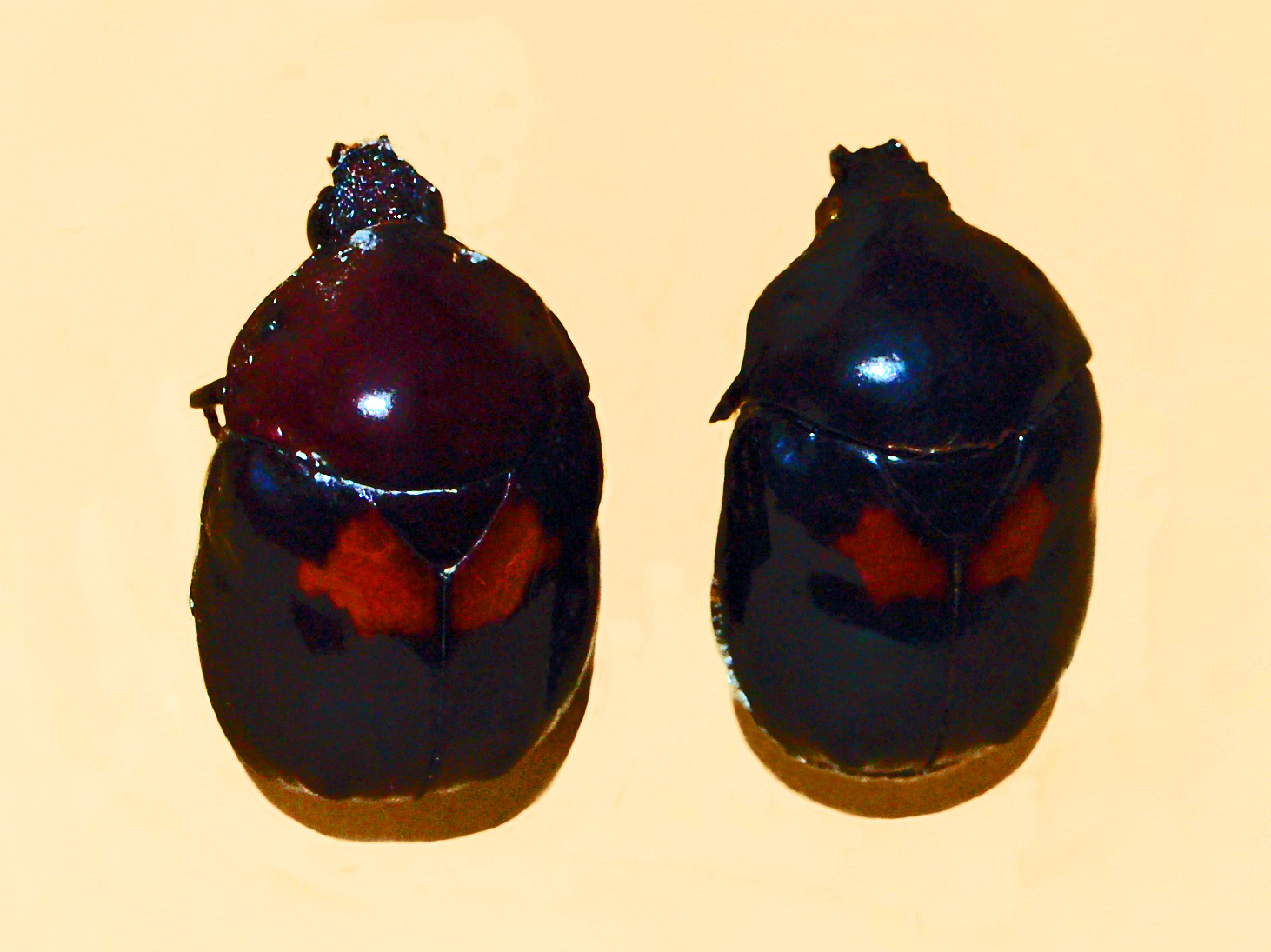
- Parastasia ephippium from Nias Island

Scientific classification
- Kingdom: Animalia
- Phylum: Arthropoda
- Clade: Pancrustacea
- Class: Insecta
- Order: Coleoptera
- Suborder: Polyphaga
- Infraorder: Scarabaeiformia
- Family: Scarabaeidae
- Tribe: Rutelini
- Genus: Parastasia; Westwood, 1841

Synonyms
- Barymorpha Guérin-Méneville, 1843; Echmatophorus Waterhouse, 1895; Ohkubous Sawada, 1938; Polymoechus LeConte, 1856; Urleta Westwood, 1875; Subpeltonotus Ghai & Chandra & Ramamurthy, 1988; Caelidia Boisduval, 1835

= Parastasia =

Genus of beetles

Parastasia is a genus of beetle belonging to the family Scarabaeidae.

== List of species ==
- Parastasia aberrans Kuijten, 1992
- Parastasia akebono Wada, 2013
- Parastasia alternata Arrow, 1899
- Parastasia andamanica Ohaus, 1898
- Parastasia anomala Arrow, 1899
- Parastasia asahi Wada, 2008
- Parastasia basalis Candèze, 1869
- Parastasia bicolor Westwood, 1841
- Parastasia bigibbosa Nonfried, 1891
- Parastasia bimaculata (Guérin-Méneville, 1843)
- Parastasia binotata Westwood, 1841
- Parastasia birmana Arrow, 1899
- Parastasia brevipes (LeConte, 1856)
- Parastasia burmeisteri Ohaus, 1898
- Parastasia canaliculata Westwood, 1841
- Parastasia carsteni Wada, 2004
- Parastasia christmasensis Wada, 2008
- Parastasia cingala Arrow, 1899
- Parastasia circumferens Arrow, 1899
- Parastasia confluens Westwood, 1841
- Parastasia coquereli Fairmaire, 1868
- Parastasia dalatina Kuijten, 1992
- Parastasia dempuensis Wada, 2008
- Parastasia dimidiata Erichson, 1845
- Parastasia discolor Westwood, 1841
- Parastasia diversipennis Ohaus, 1911
- Parastasia dolens Fairmaire, 1879
- Parastasia duchoni Ohaus, 1898
- Parastasia ephippium Snellen Van Vollenhoven, 1864
- Parastasia exophthalma Kuijten, 1992
- Parastasia fakfakensis Wada, 2008
- Parastasia femorata Burmeister, 1844
- Parastasia ferrieri Nonfried, 1895
- Parastasia fujiokai Wada & Muramoto, 1999
- Parastasia gestroi Ohaus, 1900
- Parastasia glottidion Kuijten, 1992
- Parastasia hainanensis Wada, 2009
- Parastasia helleri Ohaus, 1898
- Parastasia hitomi Wada, 1999
- Parastasia incurva Ohaus, 1923
- Parastasia indica Ohaus, 1898
- Parastasia intermedia Ohaus, 1938
- Parastasia isidai Wada, 1989
- Parastasia jamesonae Wada, 2008
- Parastasia kangeanensis Wada, 2007
- Parastasia kinibalensis Ohaus, 1901
- Parastasia kolakana Wada, 1996
- Parastasia kraatzi Ohaus, 1900
- Parastasia kuijteni Wada, 1996
- Parastasia laratina Ohaus, 1903
- Parastasia lobata Kuijten, 1992
- Parastasia lombokensis Wada, 2008
- Parastasia luzonensis Wada, 2016
- Parastasia maluku Kuijten, 1992
- Parastasia marginata (Boisduval, 1835)
- Parastasia marmorata Gestro, 1876
- Parastasia masumotoi Wada & Muramoto, 1999
- Parastasia melanocephala Burmeister, 1844
- Parastasia melanocephaloides Ohaus, 1900
- Parastasia mitsumata Wada, 2007
- Parastasia montrouzieri Fairmaire, 1883
- Parastasia moseri Ohaus, 1903
- Parastasia moultoni Ohaus, 1911
- Parastasia negrosensis Wada, 1997
- Parastasia nigriceps Westwood, 1841
- Parastasia nigripennis Sharp, 1881
- Parastasia nigromaculata (Blanchard, 1851)
- Parastasia nigroscutellata Ohaus, 1901
- Parastasia novoguineensis Ohaus, 1898
- Parastasia oberthueri Ohaus, 1900
- Parastasia pascoei (Waterhouse, 1895)
- Parastasia percheroni (Montrouzier, 1860)
- Parastasia peterzorni Wada, 2008
- Parastasia polita Ohaus, 1911
- Parastasia pseudorufonigra Wada, 2013
- Parastasia pulupuluensis Wada & Muramoto, 1999
- Parastasia punctulata Ohaus, 1900
- Parastasia qiului Zhao, 2019
- Parastasia quadrimaculata Ohaus, 1900
- Parastasia riekoae Wada, 2013
- Parastasia ruficollis Arrow, 1899
- Parastasia rufolimbata Blanchard, 1851
- Parastasia rufonigra Ohaus, 1911
- Parastasia rufopicta Westwood, 1841
- Parastasia sakaii Wada, 2004
- Parastasia sawadai Wada, 2003
- Parastasia selangorica Kuijten, 1992
- Parastasia seramensis Wada, 2016
- Parastasia spinosa Hongsuwong, Sanguansub & Jaitrong, 2022
- Parastasia stella Kuijten, 1992
- Parastasia sulcata Ohaus, 1911
- Parastasia sulcipennis Gestro, 1888
- Parastasia sumbawana Ohaus, 1898
- Parastasia takahikoi Wada, 2007
- Parastasia takeshii Wada, 1997
- Parastasia tenomensis Wada, 2008
- Parastasia terraereginae Kuijten, 1992
- Parastasia vietnamensis Wada, 2008
- Parastasia vittata Snellen Van Vollenhoven, 1864
- Parastasia wallacea Kuijten, 1992
- Parastasia weberi Ohaus, 1898
- Parastasia westwoodi Westwood, 1841
- Parastasia xanthopyga Kuijten, 1992
- Parastasia yasutoshii Wada, 2008

== Selected former species ==
- Parastasia tanaensis Wada, 2003
