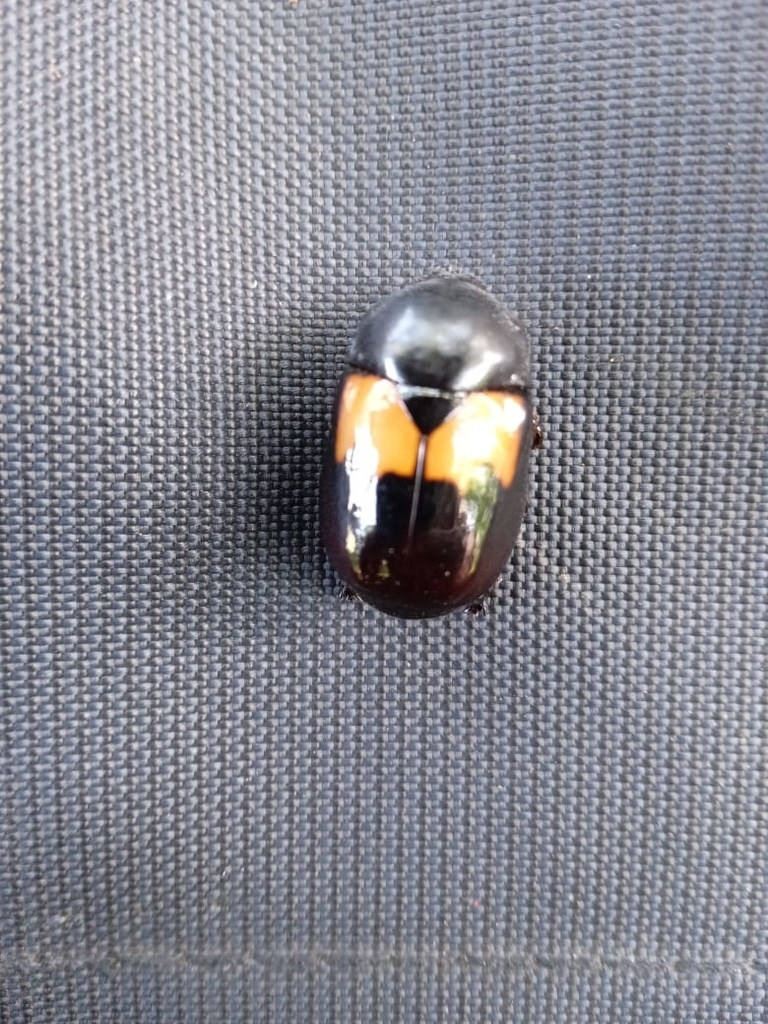

Scientific classification
- Kingdom: Animalia
- Phylum: Arthropoda
- Clade: Pancrustacea
- Class: Insecta
- Order: Coleoptera
- Suborder: Polyphaga
- Infraorder: Scarabaeiformia
- Family: Scarabaeidae
- Genus: Parastasia
- Species: P. sumbawana

Binomial name
- Parastasia sumbawana Ohaus, 1898

Synonyms
- Parastasia timoriensis Arrow, 1899

= Parastasia sumbawana =

Species of beetle

Parastasia sumbawana is a species of beetle of the family Scarabaeidae. It is found in Indonesia (Sumbawa, Kalao Island).

== Description ==
Adults reach a length of about 14–20 mm (0.55–0.79 in). The head is blackish, while the pronotum and scutellum are light to dark reddish or black, and the elytra are bright reddish to reddish black posteriorly, with the anterior half yellowish brown to orange. These colours are often separated by a darker transverse band.
