= Parastasia rufolimbata =

Scientific classification
- Kingdom: Animalia
- Phylum: Arthropoda
- Clade: Pancrustacea
- Class: Insecta
- Order: Coleoptera
- Suborder: Polyphaga
- Infraorder: Scarabaeiformia
- Family: Scarabaeidae
- Genus: Parastasia
- Species: P. rufolimbata

Binomial name
- Parastasia rufolimbata Blanchard, 1851

Species of beetle

Parastasia rufolimbata is a species of beetle of the family Scarabaeidae. It is found on the Solomon Islands.

== Description ==
Adults reach a length of about 11.5–13.5 mm (0.45–0.53 in). They are entirely reddish black, but the sides of the pronotum are yellowish brown. Sometimes, there is a dark spot in the light area, or a narrow, light, median longitudinal band. In some specimens, the margin of the pygidium is brownish and the elytra more reddish brown.
