= Parastasia dalatina =

Scientific classification
- Kingdom: Animalia
- Phylum: Arthropoda
- Clade: Pancrustacea
- Class: Insecta
- Order: Coleoptera
- Suborder: Polyphaga
- Infraorder: Scarabaeiformia
- Family: Scarabaeidae
- Genus: Parastasia
- Species: P. dalatina

Binomial name
- Parastasia dalatina Kuijten, 1992

Species of beetle

Parastasia dalatina is a species of beetle of the family Scarabaeidae. It is found in Vietnam.

== Description ==
Adults reach a length of about 17–20.5 mm (0.67–0.81 in). They are nearly identical to Parastasia klossi, except for the very different parameres.
