= Parastasia nigroscutellata =

Scientific classification
- Kingdom: Animalia
- Phylum: Arthropoda
- Clade: Pancrustacea
- Class: Insecta
- Order: Coleoptera
- Suborder: Polyphaga
- Infraorder: Scarabaeiformia
- Family: Scarabaeidae
- Genus: Parastasia
- Species: P. nigroscutellata

Binomial name
- Parastasia nigroscutellata Ohaus, 1901

Species of beetle

Parastasia nigroscutellata is a species of beetle of the family Scarabaeidae. It is found in the Philippines (Luzon, Mindoro).

== Description ==
Adults reach a length of about 11–12.5 mm (0.43–0.49 in). The head is reddish black, while the pronotum is yellowish brown with a blackish spot. The scutellum is reddish black and the rest of the body is yellowish brown, but the punctures on the elytra are darker.
