= Parastasia vietnamensis =

Scientific classification
- Kingdom: Animalia
- Phylum: Arthropoda
- Clade: Pancrustacea
- Class: Insecta
- Order: Coleoptera
- Suborder: Polyphaga
- Infraorder: Scarabaeiformia
- Family: Scarabaeidae
- Genus: Parastasia
- Species: P. vietnamensis

Binomial name
- Parastasia vietnamensis Wada, 2008

Species of beetle

Parastasia vietnamensis is a species of beetle of the family Scarabaeidae. It is found in Vietnam.

== Description ==
Adults reach a length of about 11.5 mm (0.45 in). The club of the antennae, head and ventral surface are dark brown to black, while the pronotum is dark orange and the elytra, propygidium and pygidium are reddish brown to dark brown.
