= Parastasia kuijteni =

Scientific classification
- Kingdom: Animalia
- Phylum: Arthropoda
- Clade: Pancrustacea
- Class: Insecta
- Order: Coleoptera
- Suborder: Polyphaga
- Infraorder: Scarabaeiformia
- Family: Scarabaeidae
- Genus: Parastasia
- Species: P. kuijteni

Binomial name
- Parastasia kuijteni Wada, 1996

Species of beetle

Parastasia kuijteni is a species of beetle of the family Scarabaeidae. It is found in Malaysia (Sabah).

== Description ==
Adults reach a length of about 25.4–26.5 mm (1.00–1.04 in). The head and ventral surface are black, while the pronotum, scutellum, elytra, propygidium, pygidium and antennae are dark reddish brown. The pronotum has four black patches.
