= Parastasia laratina =

Scientific classification
- Kingdom: Animalia
- Phylum: Arthropoda
- Clade: Pancrustacea
- Class: Insecta
- Order: Coleoptera
- Suborder: Polyphaga
- Infraorder: Scarabaeiformia
- Family: Scarabaeidae
- Genus: Parastasia
- Species: P. laratina

Binomial name
- Parastasia laratina Ohaus, 1903

Species of beetle

Parastasia laratina is a species of beetle of the family Scarabaeidae. It is found in Indonesia (Larat).

== Description ==
Adults reach a length of about 16–17 mm (0.63–0.67 in). In males, the head is dark reddish to black, while the rest of the body is completely reddish brown, with the anterior and posterior margins of the pronotum, margins of the scutellum and elytral suture darkened. Females have the head, pronotum, scutellum and elytra black, sometimes with a reddish hue. The rest of the body is dark reddish black.
