= Parastasia marginata =

Scientific classification
- Kingdom: Animalia
- Phylum: Arthropoda
- Clade: Pancrustacea
- Class: Insecta
- Order: Coleoptera
- Suborder: Polyphaga
- Infraorder: Scarabaeiformia
- Family: Scarabaeidae
- Genus: Parastasia
- Species: P. marginata

Binomial name
- Parastasia marginata (Boisduval, 1835)

Synonyms
- Caelidia marginata Boisduval, 1835; Parastasia zoraidae Gestro, 1876; Parastasia zoraidae kordensis Gestro, 1876; Parastasia zoraidae nigra Gestro, 1876

Species of beetle

Parastasia marginata is a species of beetle of the family Scarabaeidae. It is found in Papua New Guinea.

== Description ==
Adults reach a length of about 7.5–10.5 mm (0.30–0.41 in). The head reddish black, with the clypeus often lighter. The pronotum is yellowish-brown to reddish-orange, sometimes with dark, dark reddish to black areas. The scutellum is brown or black, and the ground colour of the elytra is as in the pronotum. The underside and legs are normally brownish to orange.
