= Parastasia sakaii =

Scientific classification
- Kingdom: Animalia
- Phylum: Arthropoda
- Clade: Pancrustacea
- Class: Insecta
- Order: Coleoptera
- Suborder: Polyphaga
- Infraorder: Scarabaeiformia
- Family: Scarabaeidae
- Genus: Parastasia
- Species: P. sakaii

Binomial name
- Parastasia sakaii Wada, 2004

Species of beetle

Parastasia sakaii is a species of beetle of the family Scarabaeidae. It is found in Indonesia (Sulawesi).

== Description ==
Adults reach a length of about 11.8–12.2 mm (0.46–0.48 in). The antennae, pronotum, propygidium, pygidium and ventral surface are dark orange, the pronotum with a central black band. The head, elytra and scutellum are brownish black, and the legs reddish brown to dark reddish brown.
