= Parastasia lombokensis =

Scientific classification
- Kingdom: Animalia
- Phylum: Arthropoda
- Clade: Pancrustacea
- Class: Insecta
- Order: Coleoptera
- Suborder: Polyphaga
- Infraorder: Scarabaeiformia
- Family: Scarabaeidae
- Genus: Parastasia
- Species: P. lombokensis

Binomial name
- Parastasia lombokensis Wada, 2008

Species of beetle

Parastasia lombokensis is a species of beetle of the family Scarabaeidae. It is found in Indonesia (Lombok).

== Description ==
Adults reach a length of about 9.1–11.8 mm (0.36–0.46 in). The antennae, clypeus, posterior half of the propygidium, pygidium and ventral surface are reddish brown, while the rest of the head and anterior half of the propygidium are dark reddish brown to dark brown. The pronotum, elytra and legs are yellowish brown to reddish brown in males. In females, the antennae, head, scutellum, propygidium, pygidium, legs and ventral surface are dark reddish brown to dark brown and the pronotum and elytra yellowish brown to reddish brown.
