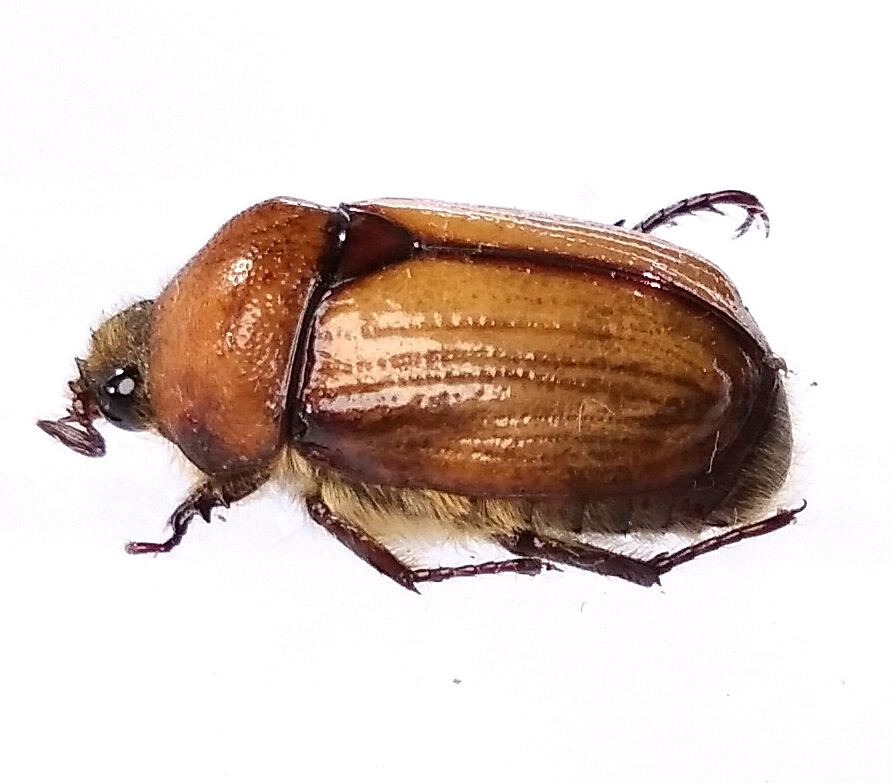

Scientific classification
- Kingdom: Animalia
- Phylum: Arthropoda
- Clade: Pancrustacea
- Class: Insecta
- Order: Coleoptera
- Suborder: Polyphaga
- Infraorder: Scarabaeiformia
- Family: Scarabaeidae
- Genus: Parastasia
- Species: P. montrouzieri

Binomial name
- Parastasia montrouzieri Fairmaire, 1883

Synonyms
- Parastasia wauensis Frey, 1969; Parastasia lutea Ohaus, 1926; Parastasia montrouzieri apicalis Ohaus, 1913; Parastasia montrouzieri infuscata Ohaus, 1913; Parastasia montrouzieri ruficollis Ohaus, 1913; Parastasia montrouzieri australis Ohaus, 1901; Parastasia simplicipes Ohaus, 1898

= Parastasia montrouzieri =

Species of beetle

Parastasia montrouzieri is a species of beetle of the family Scarabaeidae. It is found in Papua New Guinea, the Louisiade Archipelago, Australia (Queensland), Indonesia (Aru) and the Solomon Islands.

== Description ==
Adults reach a length of about 10–18 mm (0.39–0.71 in). The head is reddish to dark reddish brown, the pronotum light yellowish brown or brownish orange or brownish red to blackish. The scutellum is as the pronotum, but often somewhat darker, and with the margins darkened. The elytra range from light yellowish brown to brownish orange to brown, mostly with darkened lateral and sutural margins. The underside and legs are reddish brown to dark reddish.
