= Parastasia tenomensis =

Scientific classification
- Kingdom: Animalia
- Phylum: Arthropoda
- Clade: Pancrustacea
- Class: Insecta
- Order: Coleoptera
- Suborder: Polyphaga
- Infraorder: Scarabaeiformia
- Family: Scarabaeidae
- Genus: Parastasia
- Species: P. tenomensis

Binomial name
- Parastasia tenomensis Wada, 2008

Species of beetle

Parastasia tenomensis is a species of beetle of the family Scarabaeidae. It is found in Malaysia (Sabah).

== Description ==
Adults reach a length of about 12.9 mm (0.51 in). The antennae, elytra, posterior half of the propygidium, pygidium and ventral surface are yellowish brown to reddish brown, while the head, pronotum, scutellum and legs are reddish brown to dark reddish brown and the anterior half of the propygidium is blackish brown.

== Etymology ==
The species name is derived from the type locality, Tenom (Sabah, Borneo).
