= Parastasia hitomi =

Scientific classification
- Kingdom: Animalia
- Phylum: Arthropoda
- Clade: Pancrustacea
- Class: Insecta
- Order: Coleoptera
- Suborder: Polyphaga
- Infraorder: Scarabaeiformia
- Family: Scarabaeidae
- Genus: Parastasia
- Species: P. hitomi

Binomial name
- Parastasia hitomi Wada, 1999

Species of beetle

Parastasia hitomi is a species of beetle of the family Scarabaeidae. It is found in Vietnam.

== Description ==
Adults reach a length of about 10.8–16.9 mm (0.43–0.67 in). The antennae, head and ventral surface are blackish brown to black, while the pygidium is orange and the pronotum, scutellum, elytra, propygidium, and legs are reddish brown to dark reddish brown in males and dark brown to brownish black in females.
