= Parastasia polita =

Scientific classification
- Kingdom: Animalia
- Phylum: Arthropoda
- Clade: Pancrustacea
- Class: Insecta
- Order: Coleoptera
- Suborder: Polyphaga
- Infraorder: Scarabaeiformia
- Family: Scarabaeidae
- Genus: Parastasia
- Species: P. polita

Binomial name
- Parastasia polita Ohaus, 1911

Species of beetle

Parastasia polita is a species of beetle of the family Scarabaeidae. It is found in Indonesia (Sumatra).

== Description ==
Adults reach a length of about 12–14.5 mm (0.47–0.57 in). The dorsal surface is reddish brown, with the head and lateral areas of the pronotum often slightly darkened, and the anterior and posterior margins of the pronotum and lateral margin of the elytra darkened. The elytra have a small, yellowish to orange spot, enclosed by a dark brown to blackish area. The underside and legs are dark reddish brown.
