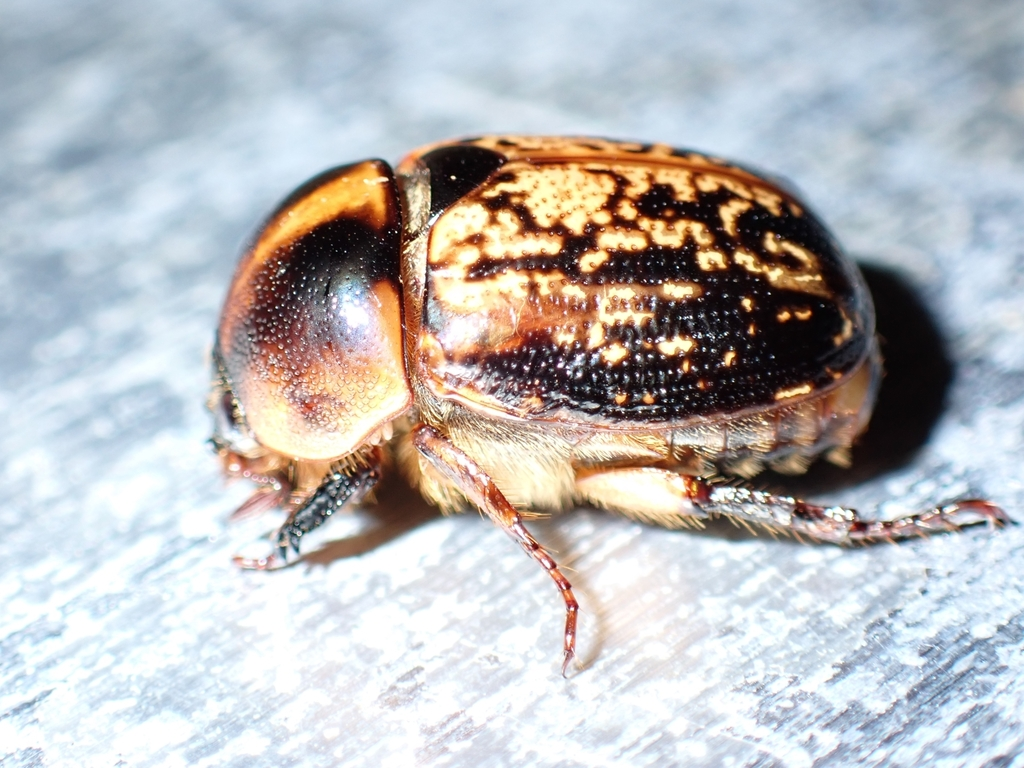

Scientific classification
- Kingdom: Animalia
- Phylum: Arthropoda
- Clade: Pancrustacea
- Class: Insecta
- Order: Coleoptera
- Suborder: Polyphaga
- Infraorder: Scarabaeiformia
- Family: Scarabaeidae
- Genus: Parastasia
- Species: P. percheroni

Binomial name
- Parastasia percheroni (Montrouzier, 1860)

Synonyms
- Cyclocephala percheroni Montrouzier, 1860; Parastasia tanaensis Wada, 2003

= Parastasia percheroni =

Species of beetle

Parastasia percheroni is a species of beetle of the family Scarabaeidae. It is found in New Caledonia, Vanuatu and Tana Island.

== Description ==
Adults reach a length of about 16.5–20 mm (0.65–0.79 in). The head is black, while the rest of the dorsal surface is yellowish to reddish brown, with all or some margins of the pronotum and the base of the elytra brownish. The underside is dark reddish brown to blackish.
