= Parastasia rufonigra =

Scientific classification
- Kingdom: Animalia
- Phylum: Arthropoda
- Clade: Pancrustacea
- Class: Insecta
- Order: Coleoptera
- Suborder: Polyphaga
- Infraorder: Scarabaeiformia
- Family: Scarabaeidae
- Genus: Parastasia
- Species: P. rufonigra

Binomial name
- Parastasia rufonigra Ohaus, 1911

Species of beetle

Parastasia rufonigra is a species of beetle of the family Scarabaeidae. It is found in Malaysia (Sabah).

== Description ==
Adults reach a length of about 16 mm (0.63 in). The head is black, with a reddish clypeus. The pronotum is yellowish red, with two small, dark brown spots and dark brown margins. The scutellum is black and the elytra are yellowish red, with blackish areas. The propygidium is reddish brown, but more yellowish laterally. The pygidium is yellowish brown and the underside and legs are mostly blackish.
