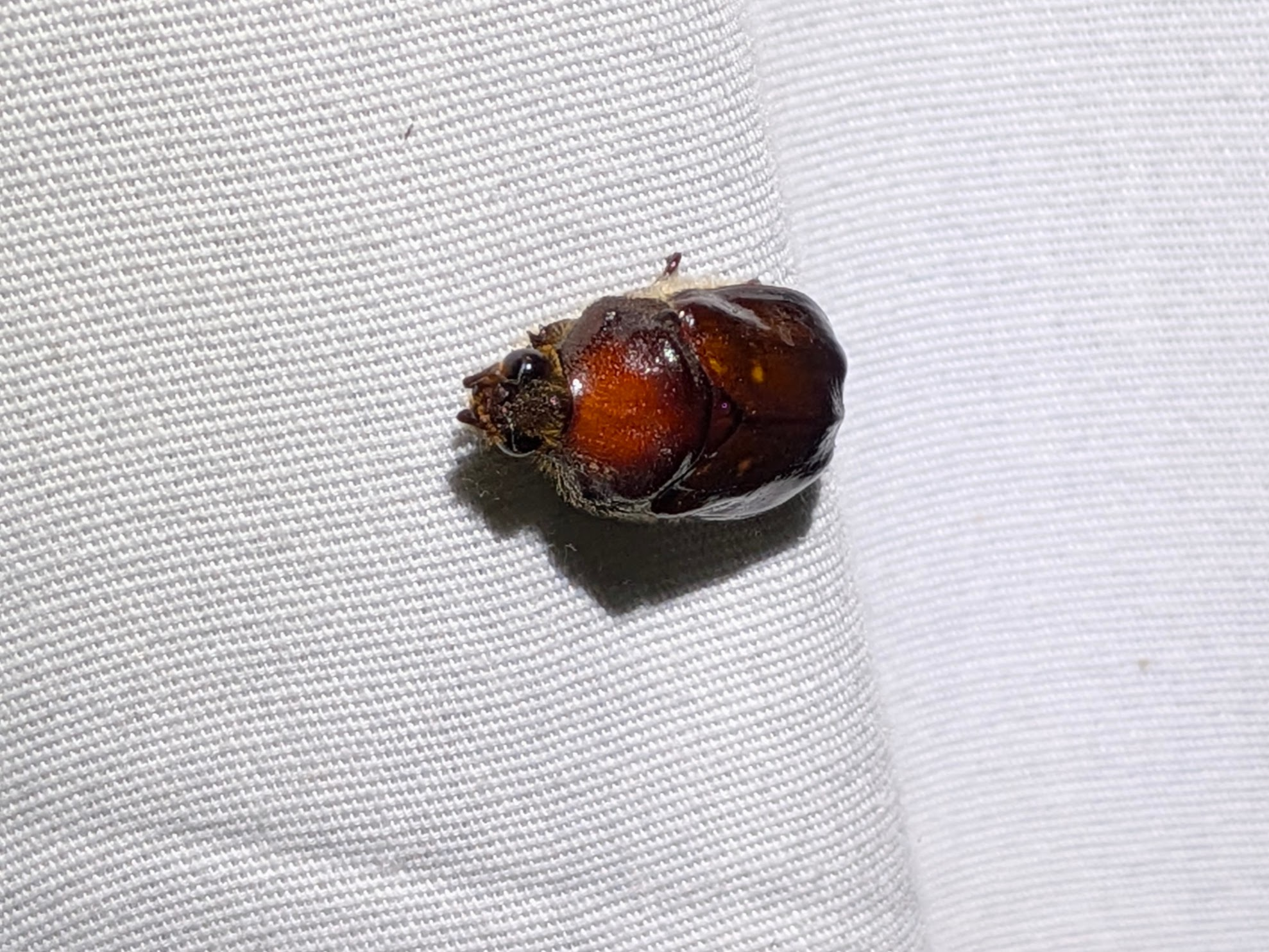

Scientific classification
- Kingdom: Animalia
- Phylum: Arthropoda
- Clade: Pancrustacea
- Class: Insecta
- Order: Coleoptera
- Suborder: Polyphaga
- Infraorder: Scarabaeiformia
- Family: Scarabaeidae
- Genus: Parastasia
- Species: P. kraatzi

Binomial name
- Parastasia kraatzi Ohaus, 1900

= Parastasia kraatzi =

Species of beetle

Parastasia kraatzi is a species of beetle of the family Scarabaeidae. It is found in Indonesia (Sumatra, Nias) and Thailand.

== Description ==
Adults reach a length of about 8–9 mm (0.31–0.35 in). They are completely dark reddish brown, but each elytron has an elongate yellowish spot behind the scutellum. The head may be brownish black. Females are dark reddish dorsally, with most of the anterior half of the elytra yellowish orange and the underside somewhat lighter reddish.
