= Parastasia kangeanensis =

Scientific classification
- Kingdom: Animalia
- Phylum: Arthropoda
- Clade: Pancrustacea
- Class: Insecta
- Order: Coleoptera
- Suborder: Polyphaga
- Infraorder: Scarabaeiformia
- Family: Scarabaeidae
- Genus: Parastasia
- Species: P. kangeanensis

Binomial name
- Parastasia kangeanensis Wada, 2007

Species of beetle

Parastasia kangeanensis is a species of beetle of the family Scarabaeidae. It is found in Indonesia (Sumatra).

== Description ==
Adults reach a length of about 15.5–16.7 mm (0.61–0.66 in). The head, legs and ventral surface are dark reddish brown to black, while the antennae and rest of the dorsal surface are reddish brown to dark reddish brown. The elytra have orange patches.
