= Parastasia intermedia =

Scientific classification
- Kingdom: Animalia
- Phylum: Arthropoda
- Clade: Pancrustacea
- Class: Insecta
- Order: Coleoptera
- Suborder: Polyphaga
- Infraorder: Scarabaeiformia
- Family: Scarabaeidae
- Genus: Parastasia
- Species: P. intermedia

Binomial name
- Parastasia intermedia Ohaus, 1938

Species of beetle

Parastasia intermedia is a species of beetle of the family Scarabaeidae. It is found in Indonesia (Kalimantan).

== Description ==
Adults reach a length of about 11.5–12 mm (0.45–0.47 in). The head is dark red, with the pronotum reddish orange with two slightly darker bands on the disc. The scutellum is reddish yellow, the elytra more brownish, the underside is dark red and most of the legs reddish yellow.
