= Parastasia kolakana =

Scientific classification
- Kingdom: Animalia
- Phylum: Arthropoda
- Clade: Pancrustacea
- Class: Insecta
- Order: Coleoptera
- Suborder: Polyphaga
- Infraorder: Scarabaeiformia
- Family: Scarabaeidae
- Genus: Parastasia
- Species: P. kolakana

Binomial name
- Parastasia kolakana Wada, 1996

Species of beetle

Parastasia kolakana is a species of beetle of the family Scarabaeidae. It is found in Indonesia (Sulawesi).

== Description ==
Adults reach a length of about 24.1–26.9 mm (0.95–1.06 in). The head, elytra, pygidium and most of the ventral surface are black, while the pronotum, scutellum, propygidium and lateral portions of the ventral surface are reddish brown. The pronotum has a large black patch and the scutellum has black margins. The propygidium has a black band and the pygidium has a reddish brown band.
