= Parastasia ruficollis =

Scientific classification
- Kingdom: Animalia
- Phylum: Arthropoda
- Clade: Pancrustacea
- Class: Insecta
- Order: Coleoptera
- Suborder: Polyphaga
- Infraorder: Scarabaeiformia
- Family: Scarabaeidae
- Genus: Parastasia
- Species: P. ruficollis

Binomial name
- Parastasia ruficollis Arrow, 1899

Species of beetle

Parastasia ruficollis is a species of beetle of the family Scarabaeidae. It is found in Indonesia (Java) and Singapore.

== Description ==
Adults reach a length of about 9–12 mm (0.35–0.47 in). The pronotum is brownish orange, while the rest of the dorsal surface is dark reddish black to black and the underside and legs are black.
