= Parastasia fakfakensis =

Scientific classification
- Kingdom: Animalia
- Phylum: Arthropoda
- Clade: Pancrustacea
- Class: Insecta
- Order: Coleoptera
- Suborder: Polyphaga
- Infraorder: Scarabaeiformia
- Family: Scarabaeidae
- Genus: Parastasia
- Species: P. fakfakensis

Binomial name
- Parastasia fakfakensis Wada, 2008

Species of beetle

Parastasia fakfakensis is a species of beetle of the family Scarabaeidae. It is found in Indonesia (Irian Jaya).

== Description ==
Adults reach a length of about 10.6 mm (0.42 in). The antennal club, head, scutellum and elytra are dark brown to blackish brown, while the pronotum, propygidium, pygidium, legs and ventral surface are reddish brown to dark reddish brown. The pronotum has a v-shaped blackish brown patch and the elytra have a reddish brown patch.
