= Parastasia dimidiata =

Scientific classification
- Kingdom: Animalia
- Phylum: Arthropoda
- Clade: Pancrustacea
- Class: Insecta
- Order: Coleoptera
- Suborder: Polyphaga
- Infraorder: Scarabaeiformia
- Family: Scarabaeidae
- Genus: Parastasia
- Species: P. dimidiata

Binomial name
- Parastasia dimidiata Erichson, 1845

Synonyms
- Parastasia heterocera Ohaus, 1898; Urleta ometoides Westwood, 1875; Parastasia nitidula Erichson, 1845

Species of beetle

Parastasia dimidiata is a species of beetle of the family Scarabaeidae. It is found in Indonesia (Sumatra, Riau Islands, Bintan Island), India (Andaman and Nicobar Islands), Myanmar and Thailand.

== Description ==
Adults reach a length of about 7–8.5 mm (0.28–0.33 in). They are entirely blackish or with the elytra with a yellowish brown to reddish area. Specimens with mostly light elytra sometimes have a reddish pronotum.
