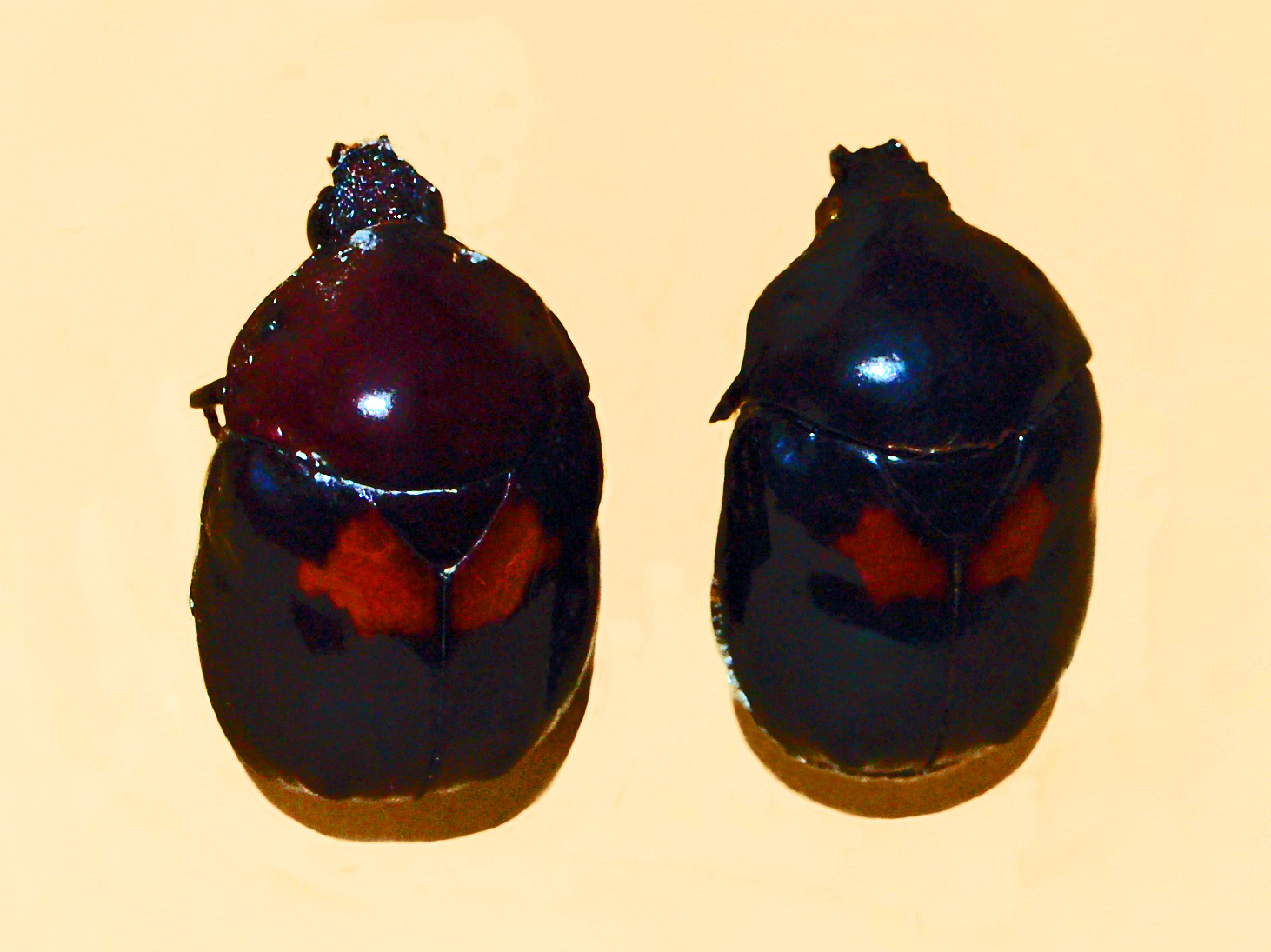
- From Nias Island

Scientific classification
- Kingdom: Animalia
- Phylum: Arthropoda
- Clade: Pancrustacea
- Class: Insecta
- Order: Coleoptera
- Suborder: Polyphaga
- Infraorder: Scarabaeiformia
- Family: Scarabaeidae
- Genus: Parastasia
- Species: P. ephippium

Binomial name
- Parastasia ephippium Snellen Van Vollenhoven, 1864

Synonyms
- Parastasia ephippium castanea Ohaus, 1900; Parastasia niasiana Ohaus, 1898

= Parastasia ephippium =

Species of beetle

Parastasia ephippium is a beetle belonging to the family Scarabaeidae. This species can be found in Malaysia, Borneo, Sumatra, Nias Island and Java.

== Description ==
Adults reach a length of about 18–23.5 mm (0.71–0.93 in). They are reddish black to black, the elytra with a yellowish brown to dark reddish area.
