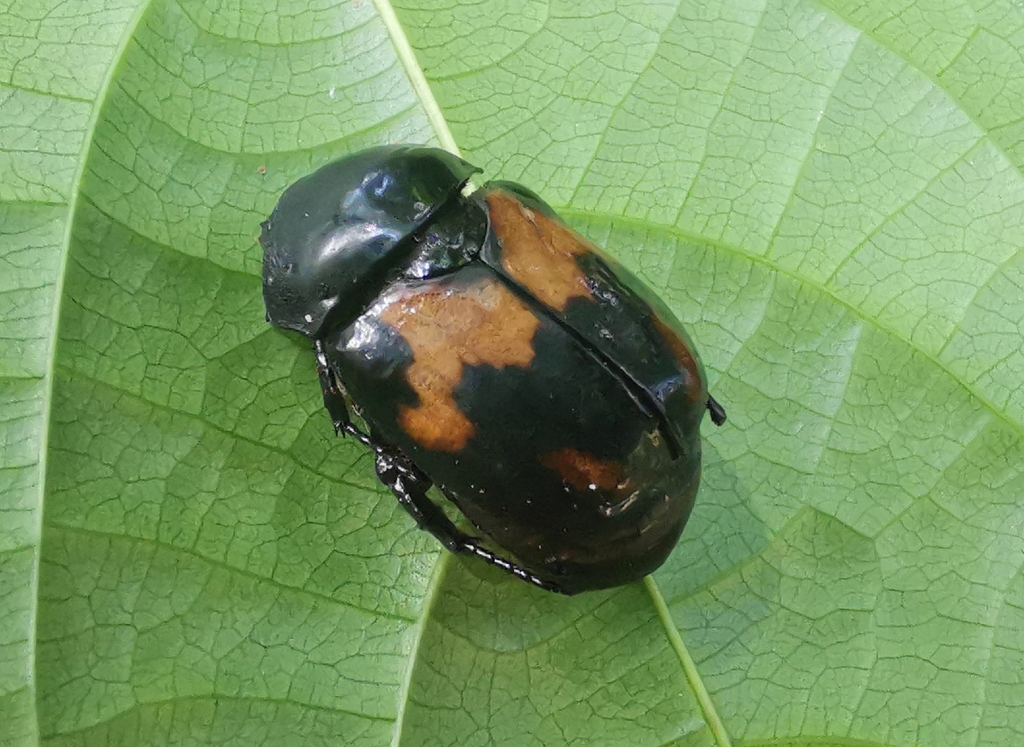

Scientific classification
- Kingdom: Animalia
- Phylum: Arthropoda
- Clade: Pancrustacea
- Class: Insecta
- Order: Coleoptera
- Suborder: Polyphaga
- Infraorder: Scarabaeiformia
- Family: Scarabaeidae
- Genus: Parastasia
- Species: P. birmana

Binomial name
- Parastasia birmana Arrow, 1899

= Parastasia birmana =

Species of beetle

Parastasia birmana is a species of beetle of the family Scarabaeidae. It is found in Laos, Myanmar, Thailand, Vietnam and China (Hainan, Yunnan).

== Description ==
Adults reach a length of about 20.5–23 mm (0.81–0.91 in). The head is black, while the pronotum and scutellum are dark red to blackish and the elytra are blackish, with a yellowish brown to orange transverse band. In females, the orange often occupyies most of anterior half of the elytra. The rest of the body is dark reddish to black.
