= Parastasia fujiokai =

Scientific classification
- Kingdom: Animalia
- Phylum: Arthropoda
- Clade: Pancrustacea
- Class: Insecta
- Order: Coleoptera
- Suborder: Polyphaga
- Infraorder: Scarabaeiformia
- Family: Scarabaeidae
- Genus: Parastasia
- Species: P. fujiokai

Binomial name
- Parastasia fujiokai Wada & Muramoto, 1999

Species of beetle

Parastasia fujiokai is a species of beetle of the family Scarabaeidae. It is found in Indonesia (Sumbawa).

== Description ==
Adults reach a length of about 12–19.2 mm (0.47–0.76 in). The dorsal surface, ventral surface and legs are blackish brown to black, the pronotum sometimes with an orange lateral band and a narrow orange anterior band. The elytra have an orange patch and the pygidium sometimes has a marginal orange band.
