= Parastasia xanthopyga =

Scientific classification
- Kingdom: Animalia
- Phylum: Arthropoda
- Clade: Pancrustacea
- Class: Insecta
- Order: Coleoptera
- Suborder: Polyphaga
- Infraorder: Scarabaeiformia
- Family: Scarabaeidae
- Genus: Parastasia
- Species: P. xanthopyga

Binomial name
- Parastasia xanthopyga Kuijten, 1992

Species of beetle

Parastasia xanthopyga is a species of beetle of the family Scarabaeidae. It is found in Malaysia.

== Description ==
Adults reach a length of about 17–19 mm (0.67–0.75 in). The head is blackish, while the pronotum, scutellum and elytra are dark reddish, the former with a vague darker median area. The propygidium and pygidium are light yellowish brown and the underside is dark reddish. The legs are dark red to black.
