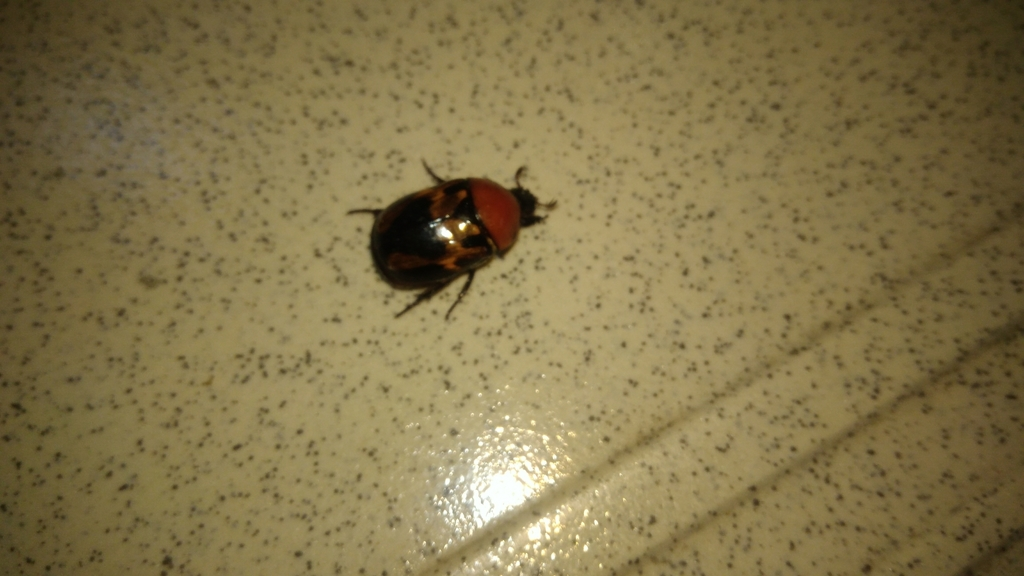

Scientific classification
- Kingdom: Animalia
- Phylum: Arthropoda
- Clade: Pancrustacea
- Class: Insecta
- Order: Coleoptera
- Suborder: Polyphaga
- Infraorder: Scarabaeiformia
- Family: Scarabaeidae
- Genus: Parastasia
- Species: P. canaliculata

Binomial name
- Parastasia canaliculata Westwood, 1841

Synonyms
- Parastasia yukioi Wada, 1989; Parastasia rubrotessellata Blanchard, 1851; Parastasia bipunctata Westwood, 1841

= Parastasia canaliculata =

Species of beetle

Parastasia canaliculata is a species of beetle of the family Scarabaeidae. It is found in the Philippines (Luzon, Mindoro, Samar, Camarines) and Taiwan.

== Description ==
Adults reach a length of about 16–22 mm (0.63–0.87 in). The head is dark red to black, while the pronotum is red (sometimes with dark margins) to blackish. The scutellum is red, brown or black and the elytra are blackish, with a yellowish brown to reddish brown pattern. The rest of the body is dark reddish brown to black.
