= Parastasia punctulata =

Scientific classification
- Kingdom: Animalia
- Phylum: Arthropoda
- Clade: Pancrustacea
- Class: Insecta
- Order: Coleoptera
- Suborder: Polyphaga
- Infraorder: Scarabaeiformia
- Family: Scarabaeidae
- Genus: Parastasia
- Species: P. punctulata

Binomial name
- Parastasia punctulata Ohaus, 1900

Species of beetle

Parastasia punctulata is a species of beetle of the family Scarabaeidae. It is found in Indonesia (Sumatra, Kalimantan).

== Description ==
Adults reach a length of about 7–9.5 mm (0.28–0.37 in). The head is dark reddish to black, while the rest of the body is light reddish brown. Females are more reddish, with the underside and legs slightly darker, or entirely dark reddish black, but often a bit lighter along the margins of the pronotum and elytra.
