= Parastasia vittata =

Scientific classification
- Kingdom: Animalia
- Phylum: Arthropoda
- Clade: Pancrustacea
- Class: Insecta
- Order: Coleoptera
- Suborder: Polyphaga
- Infraorder: Scarabaeiformia
- Family: Scarabaeidae
- Genus: Parastasia
- Species: P. vittata

Binomial name
- Parastasia vittata Snellen Van Vollenhoven, 1864

Synonyms
- Parastasia buruensis Ohaus, 1903; Parastasia ceramensis Nonfried, 1895; Parastasia atra Snellen Van Vollenhoven, 1864

Species of beetle

Parastasia vittata is a species of beetle of the family Scarabaeidae. It is found in Indonesia (Ambon, Seram, Bacan Islands, Buru, Salawati, Larat).

== Description ==
Adults reach a length of about 15.5–19.5 mm (0.61–0.77 in). The head is black, while the pronotum is yellowish to reddish brown, with two discal blackish areas. The scutellum is black and the elytra are reddish brown, with blackened margins. The underside and legs are blackish, but sometimes the margins of the pygidium are brownish. Females are mostly entirely blackish.
