= Parastasia kinibalensis =

Scientific classification
- Kingdom: Animalia
- Phylum: Arthropoda
- Clade: Pancrustacea
- Class: Insecta
- Order: Coleoptera
- Suborder: Polyphaga
- Infraorder: Scarabaeiformia
- Family: Scarabaeidae
- Tribe: Rutelini
- Genus: Parastasia
- Species: P. kinibalensis

Binomial name
- Parastasia kinibalensis Ohaus, 1901

Species of beetle

Parastasia kinibalensis is a species of beetle of the family Scarabaeidae. It is found in Indonesia (Sumatra) and Malaysia (Sabah).

== Description ==
Adults reach a length of about 23–27 mm (0.91–1.06 in). The head is black, while the pronotum, scutellum and elytra are reddish brown, the former with yellowish red margins. The underside is mostly black.
