= Parastasia femorata =

Scientific classification
- Kingdom: Animalia
- Phylum: Arthropoda
- Clade: Pancrustacea
- Class: Insecta
- Order: Coleoptera
- Suborder: Polyphaga
- Infraorder: Scarabaeiformia
- Family: Scarabaeidae
- Genus: Parastasia
- Species: P. femorata

Binomial name
- Parastasia femorata Burmeister, 1844

Synonyms
- Parastasia femorata flavobrunnea Ohaus, 1900

Species of beetle

Parastasia femorata is a species of beetle of the family Scarabaeidae. It is found in Indonesia (Sumatra, Java) and Malaysia (Malacca).

== Description ==
Adults reach a length of about 9–11.5 mm (0.35–0.45 in) for males and 9.5–13 mm (0.37–0.51 in) for females. In males, the head is dark reddish to black, while the pronotum is reddish orange. The scutellum is dark brown, the elytra reddish brown, the underside dark reddish brown and the legs often somewhat lighter. Females are black, sometimes with a reddish tinge.
