= Parastasia glottidion =

Scientific classification
- Kingdom: Animalia
- Phylum: Arthropoda
- Clade: Pancrustacea
- Class: Insecta
- Order: Coleoptera
- Suborder: Polyphaga
- Infraorder: Scarabaeiformia
- Family: Scarabaeidae
- Genus: Parastasia
- Species: P. glottidion

Binomial name
- Parastasia glottidion Kuijten, 1992

Species of beetle

Parastasia glottidion is a species of beetle of the family Scarabaeidae. It is found in Malaysia (Sabah).

== Description ==
Adults reach a length of about 13.5 mm (0.53 in). The head is black, while the pronotum is light brownish orange, with the anterior and posterior margins blackened. The scutellum and elytra are reddish brown, with the margins and a spot much darker. The propygidium is dark brown, the pygidium light brownish orange and the underside and legs dark red.

== Etymology ==
The species name is derived from Greek Glottidion (meaning small tongue) and refers to the tongue-like protrusion of the parameres.
