= Parastasia bimaculata =

Scientific classification
- Kingdom: Animalia
- Phylum: Arthropoda
- Clade: Pancrustacea
- Class: Insecta
- Order: Coleoptera
- Suborder: Polyphaga
- Infraorder: Scarabaeiformia
- Family: Scarabaeidae
- Genus: Parastasia
- Species: P. bimaculata

Binomial name
- Parastasia bimaculata (Guérin-Méneville, 1843)

Synonyms
- Barymorpha bimaculata Guérin-Méneville, 1843; Parastasia bimaculata castanicollis Ohaus, 1914; Cyclocephala maculata Montrouzier, 1860; Cyclocephala bimaculata Montrouzier, 1855

Species of beetle

Parastasia bimaculata is a species of beetle of the family Scarabaeidae. It is found in India (Andaman and Nicobar Islands, West Bengal, Uttarakhand), Indonesia (Sumatra, Banka, Banggi Island, Sulawesi, Djilolo, Ternate, Buru, Ambon, Seram), Malaysia, Myanmar, the Solomon Islands, Thailand and possibly Papua New Guinea.

== Description ==
Adults reach a length of about 11.5–15.5 mm (0.45–0.61 in). The head is dark red to black and the pronotum is ferrugineous to reddish, usually with two dark discal spots. The scutellum is yellowish to red, and the elytra are ferrugineous to reddish with a pattern of somewhat darker reddish to brownish spots. The underside and legs are ferrugineous to reddish.

== Subspecies ==
- Parastasia bimaculata bimaculata (India: West Bengal, Uttarakhand; Indonesia: Sumatra, Banka, Banguey, Sulawesi, Djilolo, Ternate, Buru, Ambon, Seram; Malaysia; Myanmar; Solomon Islands; Thailand; Papua New Guinea)
- Parastasia bimaculata nicobarica Ohaus, 1900 (Andaman and Nicobar Islands)
