= Parastasia brevipes =

Scientific classification
- Kingdom: Animalia
- Phylum: Arthropoda
- Clade: Pancrustacea
- Class: Insecta
- Order: Coleoptera
- Suborder: Polyphaga
- Infraorder: Scarabaeiformia
- Family: Scarabaeidae
- Genus: Parastasia
- Species: P. brevipes

Binomial name
- Parastasia brevipes (LeConte, 1856)

Synonyms
- Polymoechus conicicollis Casey, 1915; Polymoechus brevipes discernens Casey, 1915; Polymoechus brevipes LeConte, 1856

Species of beetle

Parastasia brevipes, the long-clubbed scarab, is a species of shining leaf chafer in the family of beetles known as Scarabaeidae. It is found in the United States (Florida, Illinois, Indiana, Iowa, Maryland, Missouri, New York, Pennsylvania, South Carolina, Tennessee, Virginia).
