= Parastasia melanocephaloides =

Scientific classification
- Kingdom: Animalia
- Phylum: Arthropoda
- Clade: Pancrustacea
- Class: Insecta
- Order: Coleoptera
- Suborder: Polyphaga
- Infraorder: Scarabaeiformia
- Family: Scarabaeidae
- Genus: Parastasia
- Species: P. melanocephaloides

Binomial name
- Parastasia melanocephaloides Ohaus, 1900

Species of beetle

Parastasia melanocephaloides is a species of beetle of the family Scarabaeidae. It is found in Indonesia (Sumatra) and Malaysia.

== Description ==
Adults reach a length of about 16.5 mm (0.65 in). The head is black, while the rest of the dorsal surface is reddish brown with the elytral suture and the margins of the pronotum and scutellum darkened. The underside and legs are dark reddish brown.
