= Parastasia basalis =

Scientific classification
- Kingdom: Animalia
- Phylum: Arthropoda
- Clade: Pancrustacea
- Class: Insecta
- Order: Coleoptera
- Suborder: Polyphaga
- Infraorder: Scarabaeiformia
- Family: Scarabaeidae
- Genus: Parastasia
- Species: P. basalis

Binomial name
- Parastasia basalis Candèze, 1869

Synonyms
- Parastasia duponti Arrow, 1899

Species of beetle

Parastasia basalis is a species of beetle of the family Scarabaeidae. It is found in Sri Lanka and Singapore.

== Description ==
Adults reach a length of about 14.5–20 mm (0.57–0.79 in). The head is dark reddish black, while the pronotum is red, with darkened anterior and posterior margins or sometimes completely blackish. The scutellum is red to black and the elytra are light yellowish brown to dark reddish orange anteriorly, and dark reddish to blackish posteriorly and along the suture. There are some dark spots on the elytra. The underside and legs are reddish to black.
