= Parastasia helleri =

Scientific classification
- Kingdom: Animalia
- Phylum: Arthropoda
- Clade: Pancrustacea
- Class: Insecta
- Order: Coleoptera
- Suborder: Polyphaga
- Infraorder: Scarabaeiformia
- Family: Scarabaeidae
- Genus: Parastasia
- Species: P. helleri

Binomial name
- Parastasia helleri Ohaus, 1898

Synonyms
- Parastasia isidai Wada, 1989

Species of beetle

Parastasia helleri is a species of beetle of the family Scarabaeidae. It is found in Indonesia (Irian Jaya) and the Philippines (Negros Island).

== Description ==
Adults reach a length of about 12–17 mm (0.47–0.67 in). The head is red to black, while the pronotum and elytra are reddish orange to reddish brown, sometimes with some margins of the pronotum darkened. The scutellum is somewhat darker than the elytra. The underside is dark reddish and the legs are black.
