= Parastasia melanocephala =

Scientific classification
- Kingdom: Animalia
- Phylum: Arthropoda
- Clade: Pancrustacea
- Class: Insecta
- Order: Coleoptera
- Suborder: Polyphaga
- Infraorder: Scarabaeiformia
- Family: Scarabaeidae
- Genus: Parastasia
- Species: P. melanocephala

Binomial name
- Parastasia melanocephala Burmeister, 1844

Species of beetle

Parastasia melanocephala is a species of beetle of the family Scarabaeidae. It is found in Indonesia (Java).

== Description ==
Adults reach a length of about 15–18 mm (0.59–0.71 in). The head is blackish, sometimes with a dark red clypeus. The rest of the dorsal surface is reddish to dark yellowish brown, often with the margins of the pronotum, scutellum and elytral suture blackened. The underside and legs are reddish brown.
