= Parastasia nigromaculata =

Scientific classification
- Kingdom: Animalia
- Phylum: Arthropoda
- Clade: Pancrustacea
- Class: Insecta
- Order: Coleoptera
- Suborder: Polyphaga
- Infraorder: Scarabaeiformia
- Family: Scarabaeidae
- Genus: Parastasia
- Species: P. nigromaculata

Binomial name
- Parastasia nigromaculata (Blanchard, 1851)

Synonyms
- Coelidia nigromaculata Blanchard, 1851; Parastasia carolinae Gestro, 1876

Species of beetle

Parastasia nigromaculata is a species of beetle of the family Scarabaeidae. It is found in Laos.

== Description ==
Adults reach a length of about 9–10.5 mm (0.35–0.41 in). The head is black with a dark red clypeus. The pronotum is brownish orange, with two brownish black spots and the scutellum is brownish black, with a brownish centre. The elytra are brownish orange with reddish to brownish black areas. The rest of the body is yellowish brown.
