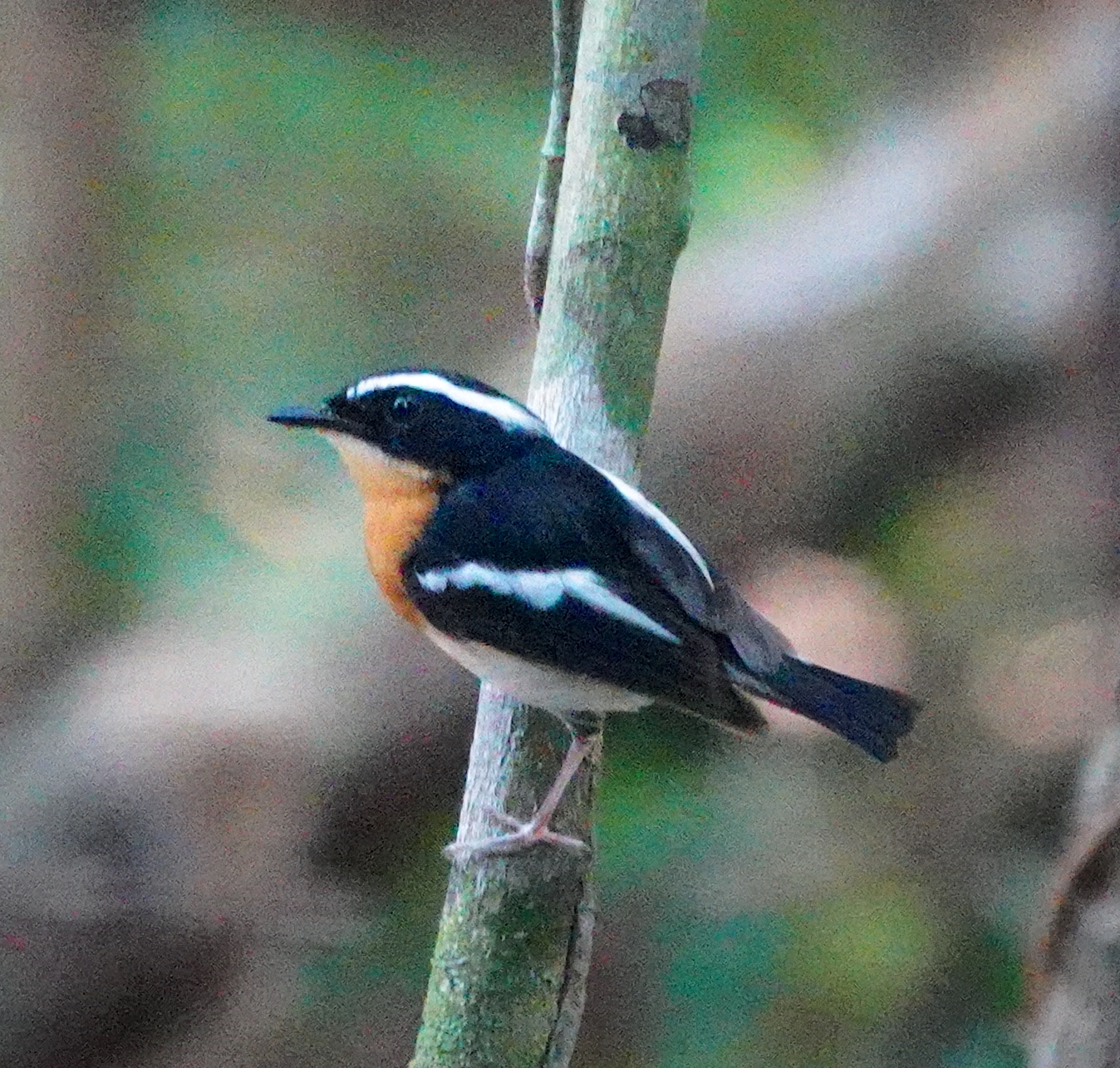

Conservation status
- Near Threatened (IUCN 3.1)

Scientific classification
- Kingdom: Animalia
- Phylum: Chordata
- Class: Aves
- Order: Passeriformes
- Family: Muscicapidae
- Genus: Ficedula
- Species: F. riedeli

Binomial name
- Ficedula riedeli (Büttikofer, 1886)

= Tanimbar flycatcher =

Species of bird

The Tanimbar flycatcher (Ficedula riedeli) is a species of bird in the family Muscicapidae. It is found on the Tanimbar Islands (Larat and Yamdena). Its habitats are subtropical or tropical moist lowland forests and subtropical or tropical moist montane forests. It is threatened by habitat loss.

It is sometimes considered a subspecies of the rufous-chested flycatcher.
