= Selaru (disambiguation) =

Selaru is an island in Indonesia

Selaru or Şelaru may refer to:

- Selaru language, an Austronesian language of Selaru and Yamdena in Indonesia
- Selaru languages, a pair of Austronesian languages spoken in Indonesia
- Șelaru, Dâmbovița, a commune in Dâmboviţa County in southern Romania

== People ==
- Aurel Șelaru (born 1935), a Romanian Olympic cyclist
