= Tanimbarese =

Indonesian ethnic group

Tanimbar
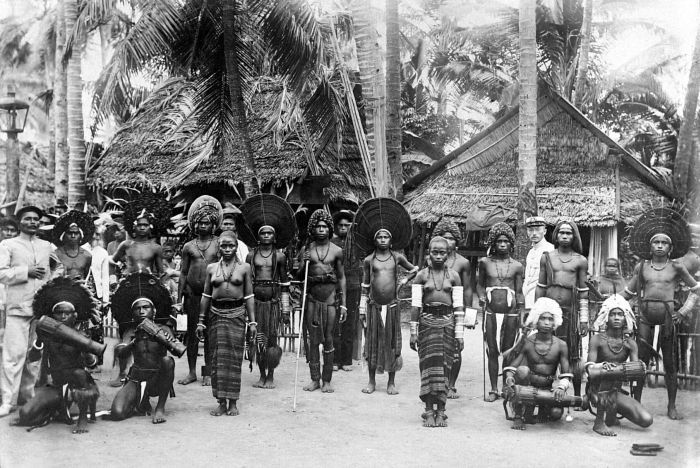
- Tanimbarese traditional orchestra and dance.

Regions with significant populations
- Indonesia; Netherlands

Languages
- Ambonese Malay, Indonesian, Seluarsa language, Selaru language, Yamdena language, Fordata language

Religion
- Christianity (Protestantism, Catholicism), Islam, Hinduism

Related ethnic groups
- Melanesians, Austronesian, Moluccans, Chinese Maluku

Tanimbarese are an Indonesian ethnic group of mixed Austronesian and Melanesian in island of Tanimbar origin. They are majority Christians followed by Muslims.

== Etymology ==
The name Tanimbar originated from the word Tanempar in Yamdena language or Tnebar in Fordata language meaning 'stranded'.

== Duan Lolat ==
Tanimbar local society and social structure is based on the traditions called Duan Lolat. Fundamentally Duan Lolat is the marriage tradition of the Tanimbarese, the groom and his family as "the ones receiving female" are called Lolat, while the bride's family as "the ones giving female" are called Duan. Duan will be the superior, while Lolat will be the subordinate in this relationship. The bride price that needs to be paid by the Lolat includes sopi traditional alcoholic drinks, loran precious metals, belusu bracelet made from boar tusk or ivory, mas bulan gold, somalai headdress made from bird-of-paradise feather, and ivory tusk, though this has been switched to money considering its rarity. Usually the Lolat family members work collectively to obtain these precious items to be given to the Duan.

== Literature ==
- McKinnon, Susan. "8. The Tanimbarese Tavu: The Ideology of Growth and the Material Configurations of Houses and Hierarchy in an Indonesian Society" In Beyond Kinship: Social and Material Reproduction in House Societies edited by Rosemary A. Joyce and Susan D. Gillespie, 161–176. Philadelphia: University of Pennsylvania Press, 2000.
- Kjellgren, E. P. (1997). [Review of Forgotten Islands of Indonesia: The Art and Culture of the Southeast Moluccas, by N. de Jonge & T. van Dijk]. Pacific Arts, 15/16, 135–137.
- Членов М. А. - Танимбарцы // Народы и религии мира / Глав. ред. В. А. Тишков. М.: Большая Российская Энциклопедия, 1999.
- BUCKINGHAM, W. (2018). Stealing with the Eyes: Imaginings and Incantations in Indonesia. Haus Publishing. https://doi.org/10.2307/jj.17072631
