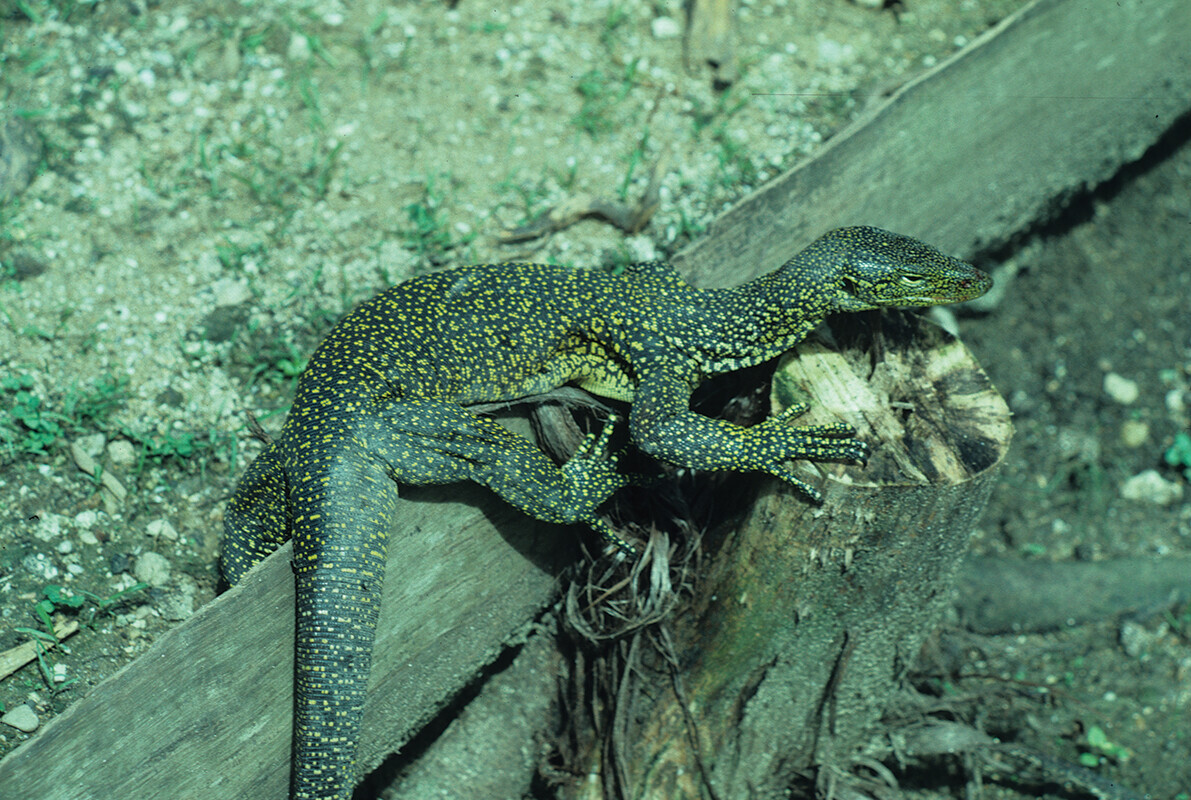
- Adult on Yamdena Island

Scientific classification
- Kingdom: Animalia
- Phylum: Chordata
- Class: Reptilia
- Order: Squamata
- Suborder: Anguimorpha
- Family: Varanidae
- Genus: Varanus
- Species: V. tanimbar

Binomial name
- Varanus tanimbar Weijola & Kraus, 2023

= Tanimbar monitor =

Species of monitor lizard

The Tanimbar monitor (Varanus tanimbar) is a species of monitor lizard native to the Tanimbar archipelago of Maluku, Indonesia. It was first described in 2023 using specimens that were preserved at the Western Australian Museum. Another species of Varanus, the Louisiade monitor, was described in the same study.

== Distribution ==
Varanus tanimbar is the only species of monitor lizard native to the Tanimbar Islands, where it resides on the two largest islands: Yamdena and Selaru.

== Gallery ==
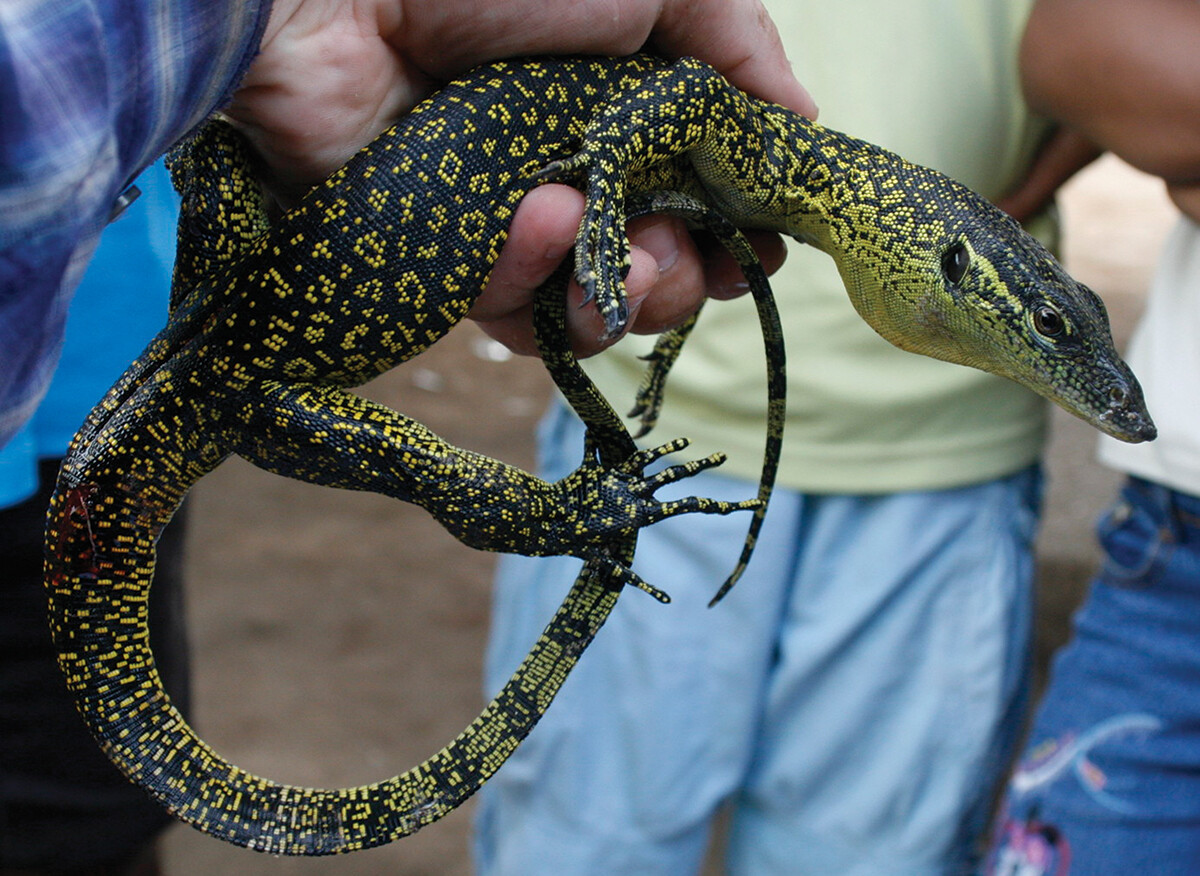
Juvenile

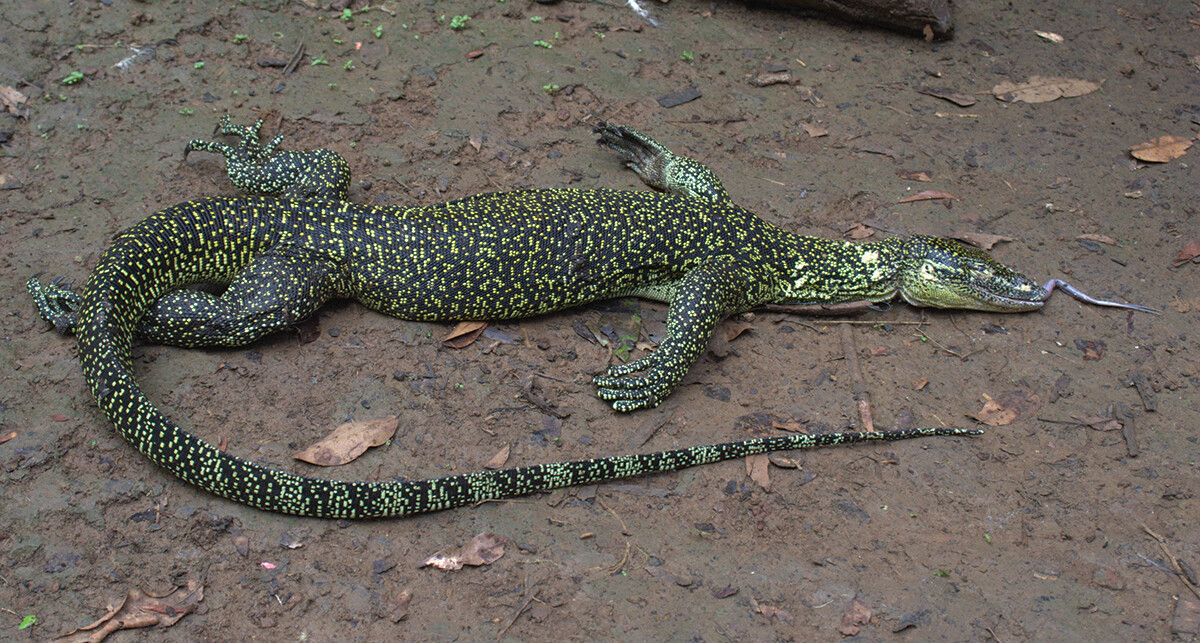
Adult

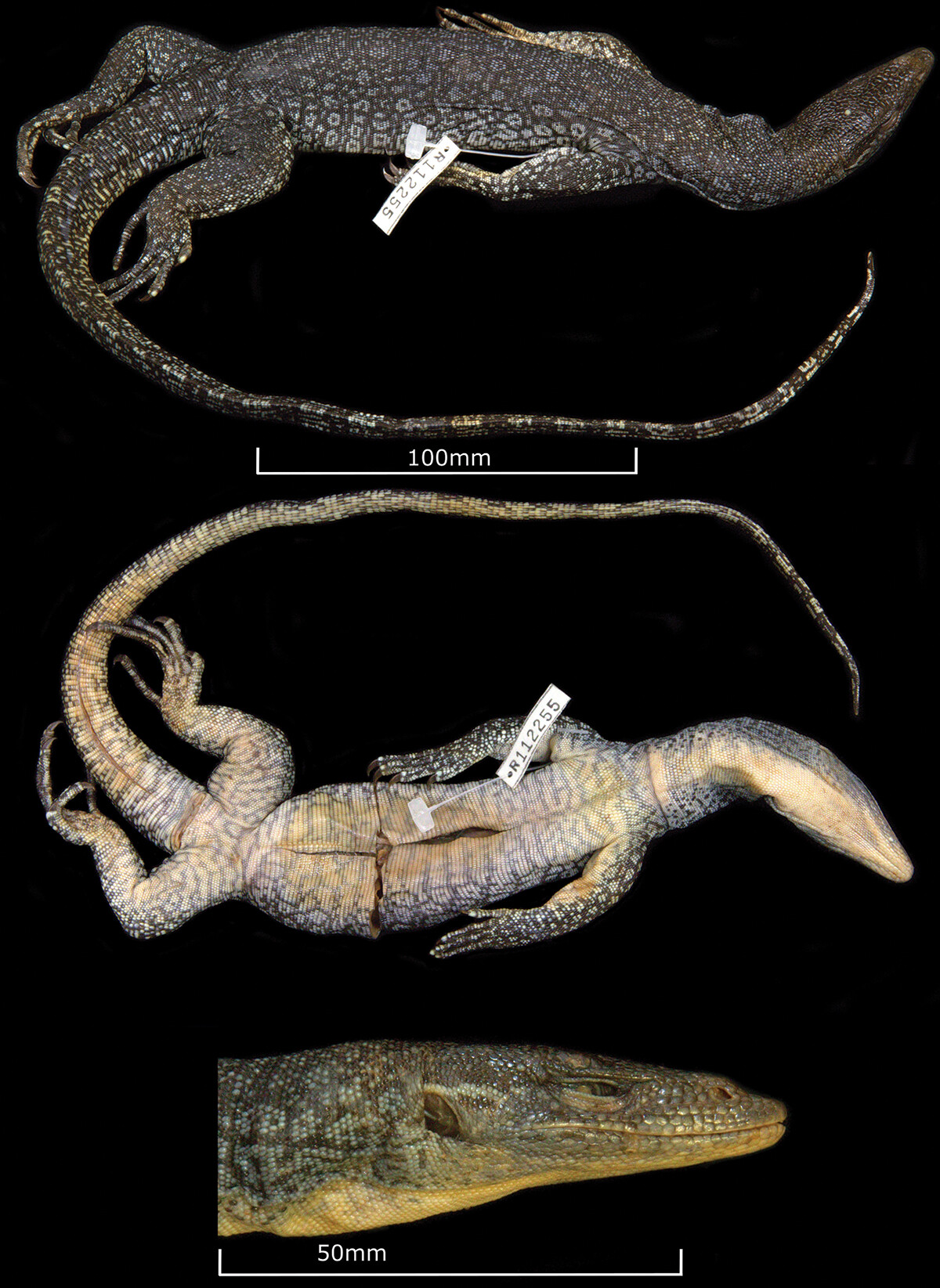
Juvenile holotype

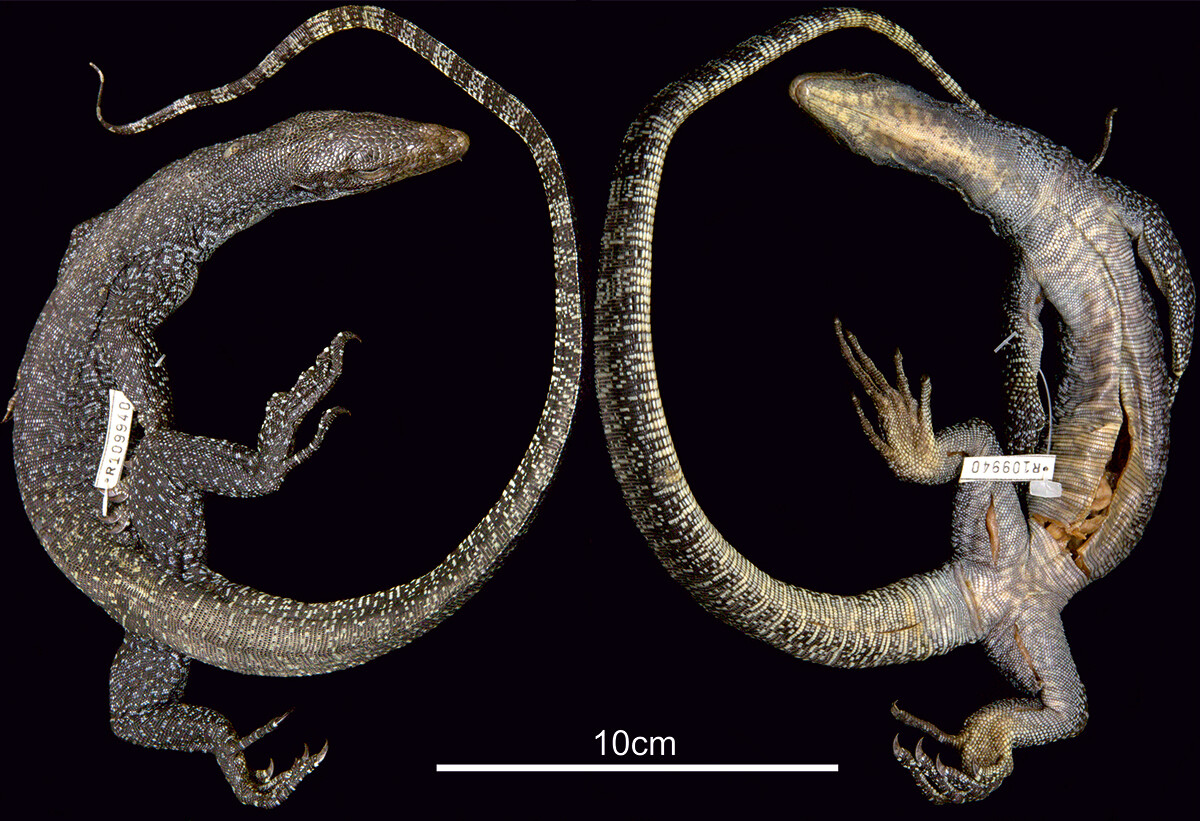
Paratype
