= Seluwasan language =

Austronesian language spoken in Maluku, Indonesia

Seluwasan
- Native to: Indonesia
- Region: Tanimbar Islands
- Native speakers: (2,840 cited 1980)
- Language family: Austronesian: Malayo-Polynesian; Central–Eastern; Timor-Babar; Southwest Tanimbar; Seluwasan
- Dialects: Makatian

Language codes
- ISO 639-3: sws
- Glottolog: selu1242

Seluwasan is an Austronesian language of Yamdena, in the Maluku Islands of Indonesia. It is not close to Selaru. The Makatian dialect is distinct.
