= Oratmangun (surname) =

Surname

- Nickname: Oratmangun; Oratmangoen
- Ethnic: Tanimbarese
- Town/Village: Fordata
- Notable people: Ragnar Oratmangoen

Oratmangun is a surname that is common in the Tanimbar Islands of Indonesia.

== Notable people ==
- Dharma Oratmangun - Indonesian musician
- Djauhari Oratmangun - Indonesian ambassador to China and Mongolia
- Ragnar Oratmangoen - Dutch-born Indonesian footballer
