= 132nd meridian east =

Line of longitude

132nd meridian east (interactive map)

The meridian 132° east of Greenwich is a line of longitude that extends from the North Pole across the Arctic Ocean, Asia, Australia, the Indian Ocean, the Southern Ocean, and Antarctica to the South Pole.

The 132nd meridian east forms a great circle with the 48th meridian west.

== From Pole to Pole ==
Starting at the North Pole and heading south to the South Pole, the 132nd meridian east passes through:

Co-ordinates	Country, territory or sea	Notes
90°0′N 132°0′E	Arctic Ocean	
77°0′N 132°0′E	Laptev Sea	
71°16′N 132°0′E	Russia	Sakha Republic; Khabarovsk Krai — from 58°3′N 132°0′E; Sakha Republic — from 57°46′N 132°0′E; Khabarovsk Krai — from 57°40′N 132°0′E; Amur Oblast — from 55°42′N 132°0′E; Khabarovsk Krai — from 54°56′N 132°0′E; Amur Oblast — from 53°9′N 132°0′E; Khabarovsk Krai — from 51°46′N 132°0′E; Jewish Autonomous Oblast — from 49°23′N 132°0′E
47°42′N 132°0′E	China	Heilongjiang
45°15′N 132°0′E	Russia	Primorsky Krai — Passing just east of Vladivostok (at 43°7′N 131°54′E)
43°6′N 132°0′E	Sea of Japan	Passing just east of the Liancourt Rocks (at 37°14′N 131°52′E)
34°51′N 132°0′E	Japan	Island of Honshū — Shimane Prefecture — Yamaguchi Prefecture — from 34°22′N 132°0′E
33°54′N 132°0′E	Inland Sea	
33°19′N 132°0′E	Bungo Channel	
33°5′N 132°0′E	Japan	Island of Kyūshū, Ōita Prefecture
32°49′N 132°0′E	Pacific Ocean	Passing just east of the island of Pulo Anna, Palau (at 4°39′N 131°58′E)
0°33′S 132°0′E	Indonesia	Island of New Guinea
1°59′S 132°0′E	Berau Bay	
2°46′S 132°0′E	Indonesia	Island of New Guinea
2°54′S 132°0′E	Ceram Sea	
5°18′S 132°0′E	Indonesia	Island of Kur
5°22′S 132°0′E	Banda Sea	
6°59′S 132°0′E	Indonesia	Island of Fordata
7°0′S 132°0′E	Arafura Sea	Passing just east of the island of Larat, Indonesia (at 7°12′S 131°59′E)
11°7′S 132°0′E	Australia	Northern Territory — Cobourg Peninsula
11°26′S 132°0′E	Van Diemen Gulf	
12°17′S 132°0′E	Australia	Northern Territory; South Australia — from 26°0′S 132°0′E
31°52′S 132°0′E	Indian Ocean	Australian authorities consider this to be part of the Southern Ocean
60°0′S 132°0′E	Southern Ocean	
66°11′S 132°0′E	Antarctica	Australian Antarctic Territory, claimed by Australia

== See also ==
- 131st meridian east
- 133rd meridian east
