= Scopula deflavaria =

Scientific classification
- Domain: Eukaryota
- Kingdom: Animalia
- Phylum: Arthropoda
- Class: Insecta
- Order: Lepidoptera
- Family: Geometridae
- Genus: Scopula
- Species: S. deflavaria

Binomial name
- Scopula deflavaria (Warren, 1896)

Synonyms
- Ptychopoda deflavaria Warren, 1896; Craspedia calorifica Warren, 1898; Scopula relevata Prout, 1938

Species of geometer moth in subfamily Sterrhinae

Scopula deflavaria is a moth of the family Geometridae. It is found in Indonesia (Tenimber, Bali, Java, Sumatra, Timor and Sulawesi).

== Subspecies ==
- Scopula deflavaria deflavaria (Tanimbar Islands)
- Scopula deflavaria calorifica (Warren, 1898) (Bali)
- Scopula deflavaria relevata Prout, 1938 (Sulawesi)
