= Etiella grisea =

Scientific classification
- Kingdom: Animalia
- Phylum: Arthropoda
- Class: Insecta
- Order: Lepidoptera
- Family: Pyralidae
- Genus: Etiella
- Species: E. grisea

Binomial name
- Etiella grisea Hampson, 1903

Synonyms
- Etiella drososcia Meyrick, 1929

Species of moth

Etiella grisea is a species of snout moth in the genus Etiella. It was described by George Hampson in 1903. It is found in Sri Lanka, the Chagos Archipelago, Tahiti, the Cook Islands, Samoa, Fiji, the New Hebrides, the Solomon Islands, Australia, the Tanimbar Islands, New Guinea and Guam.

== Subspecies ==
- Etiella grisea grisea (Sri Lanka, Chagos Archipelago)
- Etiella grisea drososcia Meyrick, 1929 (Tahiti, Cook Islands, Samoa, Fiji, New Hebrides, Solomon Islands, Australia, Tanimbar, New Guinea, Guam)
