= 131st meridian =

131st meridian may refer to:

- 131st meridian east, a line of longitude east of the Greenwich Meridian
- 131st meridian west, a line of longitude west of the Greenwich Meridian

| 131st meridian west | 131st meridian east |
