= Larat =

Place in Indonesia

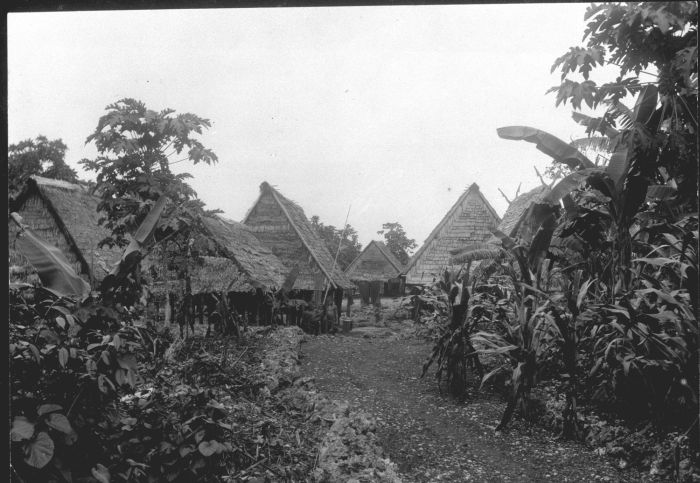
- Kampong in Larat c. 1918

Geography
- Location: Arafura Sea
- Coordinates: 7.22°S 131.97°E
- Archipelago: Tanimbar Islands

Administration
- Indonesia
- Province: Moluccas
- Regency: West Southeast Maluku

Additional information
- Time zone: UTC+9

Larat (Indonesian pronunciation: [ˈlarat̪̚]) is a border island of Indonesia located in the Maluku province, northeast of Yamdena Island. Together with Yamdena and Selaru and a number of other smaller islands, it is part of the Tanimbar Islands archipelago. It is located in the Aru Sea and is part of the government of West Southeast Maluku regency, Maluku province. The main town on the island is also called Larat. The island has seven villages: Ridol, Ritabel, Watidal, Kaliobar, Kelaan, West Lamdesar, and East Lamdesar. The language spoken in Larat is Fordata.

== See also ==
- List of outlying islands of Indonesia
