= Southwest Tanimbar languages =

Language family

Southwest Tanimbar
- South Tanimbar, Selaru
- Geographic distribution: Indonesia (Maluku Islands)
- Linguistic classification: Austronesian: Malayo-Polynesian; Central–Eastern; Timor-Babar; Southwest Tanimbar
- Subdivisions: Selaru; Seluwasan (including Makatian)

Language codes
- Glottolog: sout2890

The Southwest Tanimbar languages, also known as the South Tanimbar languages or Selaru languages, are a pair of Austronesian languages (geographically Central–Eastern Malayo-Polynesian languages) spoken in the Tanimbar Islands of Indonesia. They are not closely related, being 56% lexically similar (Ethnologue).

These languages are Selaru and Seluwasan.
