= 48th meridian west =

Line of longitude

48th meridian west

The meridian 48° west of Greenwich is a line of longitude that extends from the North Pole across the Arctic Ocean, Greenland, the Atlantic Ocean, South America, the Southern Ocean, and Antarctica to the South Pole.

The 48th meridian west forms a great circle with the 132nd meridian east.

The map indexing scheme of Canada's National Topographic System begins in the east at the 48th meridian west.

== From Pole to Pole ==
Starting at the North Pole and heading south to the South Pole, the 48th meridian west passes through:

Co-ordinates	Country, territory or sea	Notes
90°0′N 48°0′W	Arctic Ocean	
83°41′N 48°0′W	Lincoln Sea	
82°53′N 48°0′W	Greenland	John Murray Island
82°46′N 48°0′W	Lincoln Sea	
82°30′N 48°0′W	Victoria Fjord	
82°17′N 48°0′W	Greenland	Wulff Land
60°41′N 48°0′W	Atlantic Ocean	
0°43′S 48°0′W	Brazil	Pará; Maranhão — from 4°45′S 48°0′W; Tocantins — from 5°14′S 48°0′W; Goiás — from 13°15′S 48°0′W; Federal District — from 15°30′S 48°0′W, passing just west of Brasília (at 15°47′S 47°54′W); Goiás — from 16°2′S 48°0′W; Minas Gerais — from 18°27′S 48°0′W; São Paulo — from 20°5′S 48°0′W
25°13′S 48°0′W	Atlantic Ocean	
60°0′S 48°0′W	Southern Ocean	
72°32′S 48°0′W	Antarctica	Claimed by both Argentina (Argentine Antarctica) and United Kingdom (British Antarctic Territory)

== See also ==
- 47th meridian west
- 49th meridian west
