= Etiella walsinghamella =

Scientific classification
- Domain: Eukaryota
- Kingdom: Animalia
- Phylum: Arthropoda
- Class: Insecta
- Order: Lepidoptera
- Family: Pyralidae
- Genus: Etiella
- Species: E. walsinghamella

Binomial name
- Etiella walsinghamella Ragonot, 1888

Synonyms
- Etiella flavofasciella Inoue, 1959

Species of moth

Etiella walsinghamella is a species of snout moth in the genus Etiella. It was described by Émile Louis Ragonot in 1888. It is found from Australia (Queensland) to New Guinea and Japan.
