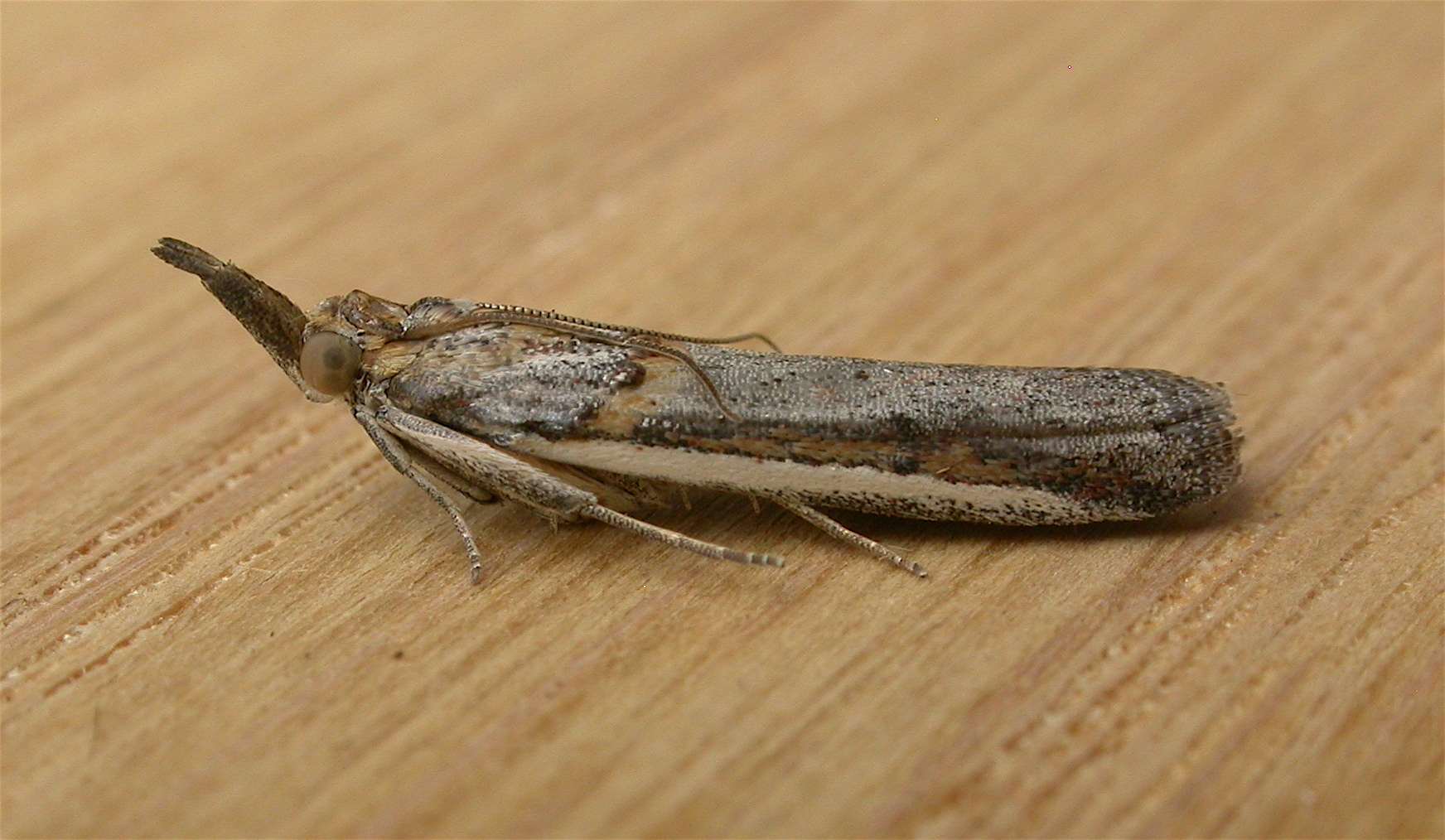

Scientific classification
- Domain: Eukaryota
- Kingdom: Animalia
- Phylum: Arthropoda
- Class: Insecta
- Order: Lepidoptera
- Family: Pyralidae
- Genus: Etiella
- Species: E. behrii

Binomial name
- Etiella behrii (Zeller, 1848)

Synonyms
- Pempelia behrii Zeller, 1848; Alata subaurella Walker, 1866; Pempelia subaurella; Alata consociella Walker, 1866; Etiella ochristrigella Ragonot, 1888

= Etiella behrii =

Species of moth

Etiella behrii (common names include lucerne seed web moth, small tabby and pyralid moth) is a species of moth of the family Pyralidae, occurring sporadically but when present considered a serious pest of agricultural crops throughout parts of Australia.

The name "lucerne seed web moth" comes from the behaviour of a newly hatched larva spinning a protective web around itself.

== Distribution ==
Etiella behrii is found in much of South East Asia including Hong Kong, Indonesia, Malaysia. and most of Australia. It also occurs throughout Australia in Northern Territory, Queensland, New South Wales, ACT, Victoria, and Western Australia.

More recently E. behrii has been discovered to migrate 250 km (160 mi) over the Bass Strait to Tasmania where its detection coincides with the arrival of multiple known migratory species usually after suitable airflows for migration occur across the Bass Strait. However, it theorised that E. behrii is prevented from breeding and establishing in Tasmania due to a lack of winter diapause and the absence of observed larvae.

== Taxonomy ==
This species was first described by German entomologist Philipp Christoph Zeller in 1848 in his works, Exotische Phycideen (Isis 1848). Zeller was known as the greatest lepidopterist of the century as he named over 186 new genera of moths.

Etiella behrii is classified under the pyralid and crambid snout moth superfamily Pyraloidea, the pyralid Snout moth family Pyralidae, the knot horn moth subfamily Phycitinae, and the tribe Phycintini.

== Description ==
The early instar larva of E. behrii is pale green with a mottled brown head and pink markings. As the caterpillars mature, they become pinker and the stripes redden. The larvae grow up to 12 mm (0.47 in) long, and have a dark brown head casing, four pairs of abdominal prolegs and one anal proleg. The eggs are oval-shaped, clear or off-white and turn to orange before hatching.

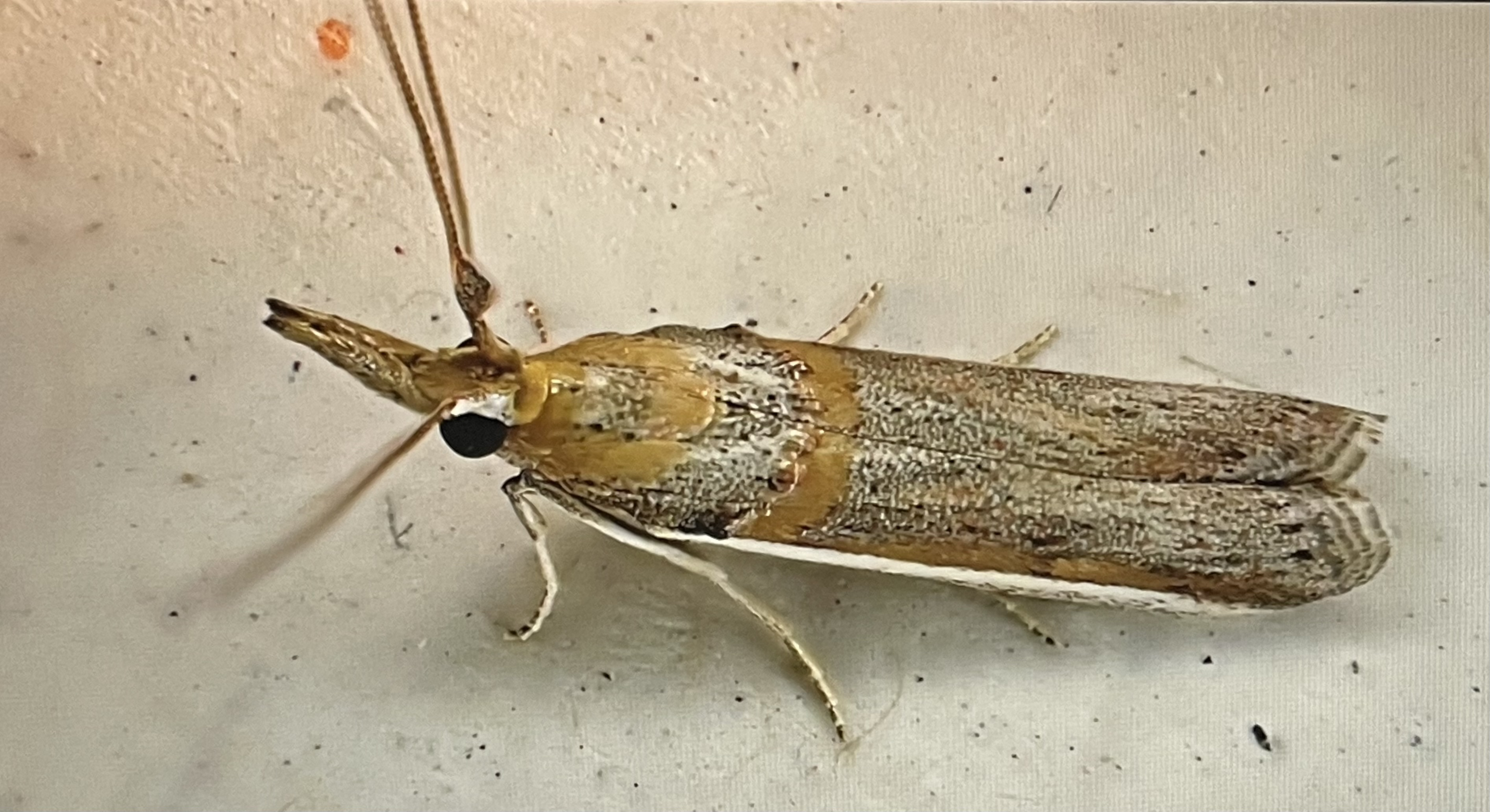
Male E.behrii with knob on antennae

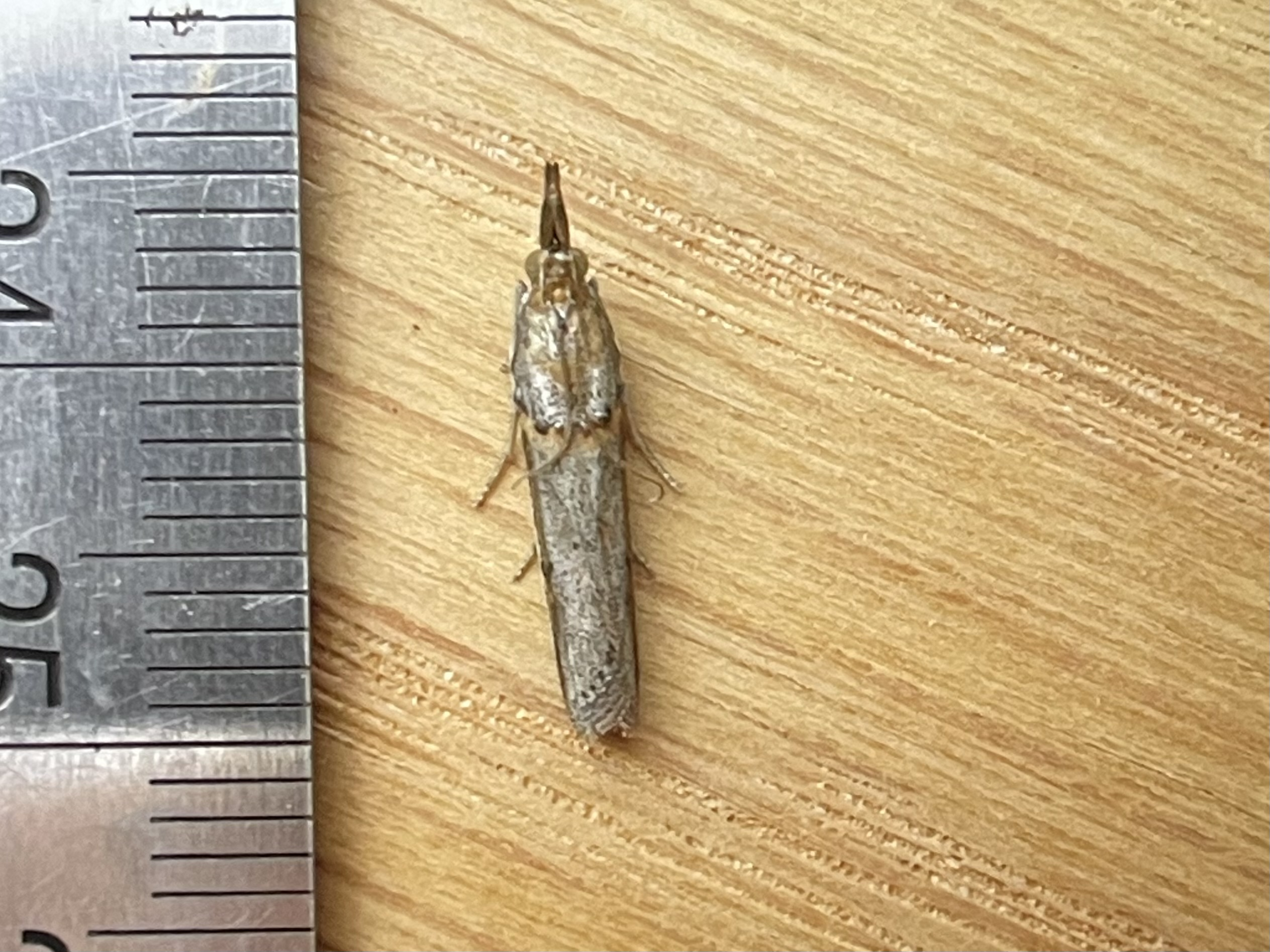
Adult Etiella behrii

The adult lucerne seed web moth are long and slender when at rest. They have a protruding beak and are brown or grey, with a brown pattern on the forewing and a transverse orange stripe near the base. The forewings also have a white line along the leading edge or costa. The hind wings have brown veins running through satin beige/white with a dark brown outer edge. The males have knobs at the base of the antennae. The wingspan is about 10 mm (0.39 in).

== Lifecycle ==
In Australia, the lucerne seed web moth occurs sporadically but can have up to three generations per year, occurring from spring to autumn. In south-east South Australia, E. behrii has at least four overlapping generations each year and a hint of other small generations in autumn.

The female can lay up to 200 eggs on the surface of leaves, stems and flowers of their food. The eggs typically hatch in 10–14 days. Once eggs have hatched, larvae will bore into green lucerne seed pods where they will feed as they grow, causing significant crop damage. Larvae from summer pulses usually complete the life cycle in a single seed pod before boring out in a pin-sized hole. The first flight of the adult moths take place in September.

Larvae from the previous autumn develop in the soil and adults emerge in the spring. Peaks of flight occur in late September, late November, late December and late February.

== Behaviour and ecology ==
Etiella behrii as both adult and larvae feed on at least six native and 18 introduced legume species including those in the genera Lens, Lupinus and Medicago and are considered a serious but sporadic pest of lucerne seed crops (Medicago sativa) in South Australia.

The larvae are considered an agricultural pest on other leguminous crops such as peanut (Arachis hypogaea), Chamaecytisus prolifer, sky lupine (Lupinus nanus), alfalfa (Medicago sativa), pea (Pisum sativum) and soybean (Glycine species).

Shortly after hatching, the larvae will bore into green seed pods, creating pin-holes. During early larval development, only one seed pod will be damaged. The larva feeds initially internally but subsequently externally on seed in the seed pods. The mature larvae are known to web together multiple seed pods to continue a feeding regime.

Etiella behrii is thought to live on native plants in scrubland and along roadside during spring and early summer before infesting lucerne seed crops in January.

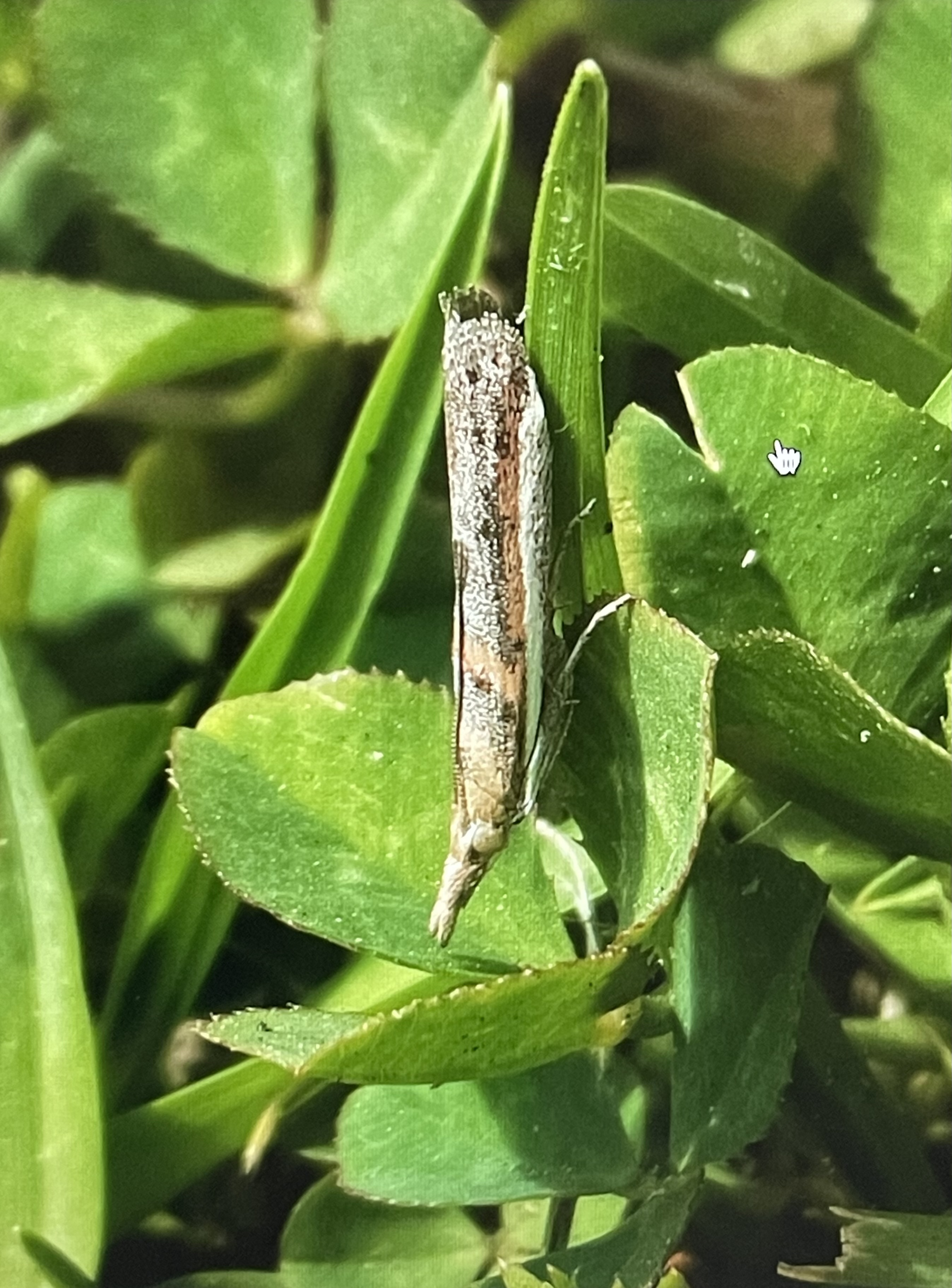
Adult

Many infestations are slight and can go unnoticed but occasionally there is a very heavy infestation in one season. The cause of sporadic widespread E. behrii infestations in lucerne crops is relatively unknown. Multiple factors are thought to contribute to changes in the size of infestation each year, such as the timing of crops, the scarcity of native plants, and the presence of predators. It has been observed that early lucerne crops are more likely to experience a heavier infestation of E. behrii than late crops. The abundance of predators and parasites can be a factor leading to decreased larval numbers in mid to late January, a time when lucerne crops contain a large proportion of green seed pods suitable for larval development. There are ten recorded species of parasitic wasps and flies, two pathogens and several predatory insects that attack the larvae of lucerne seed web moth.
