= Etiella chrysoporella =

Scientific classification
- Kingdom: Animalia
- Phylum: Arthropoda
- Class: Insecta
- Order: Lepidoptera
- Family: Pyralidae
- Genus: Etiella
- Species: E. chrysoporella

Binomial name
- Etiella chrysoporella Meyrick, 1879

Species of moth

Etiella chrysoporella is a species of snout moth in the genus Etiella. It is found in Australia and the Tanimbar Islands.
