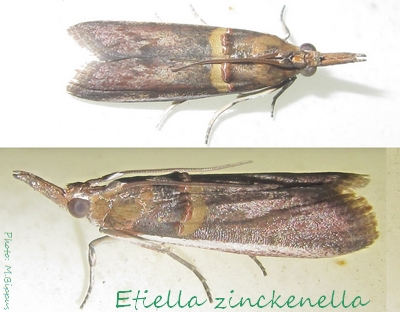
- Etiella zinckenella

Scientific classification
- Domain: Eukaryota
- Kingdom: Animalia
- Phylum: Arthropoda
- Class: Insecta
- Order: Lepidoptera
- Family: Pyralidae
- Subfamily: Phycitinae
- Tribe: Phycitini
- Genus: Etiella; Zeller, 1839

Synonyms
- List: Alata Walker, 1863; Arucha Walker, 1863; Ceratamma Butler, 1881; Mella Walker, 1859; Modiana Walker, 1863; Rhamphodes Guenée, 1845

= Etiella =

Genus of moth

Etiella is a genus of snout moths. It was described by Philipp Christoph Zeller in 1839.

== Species ==
- Etiella behrii (Zeller, 1848)
- Etiella chrysoporella Meyrick, 1879
- Etiella grisea Hampson, 1903
- Etiella hobsoni (Butler, 1880)
- Etiella scitivittalis (Walker, 1863)
- Etiella walsinghamella Ragonot, 1888
- Etiella zinckenella (Treitschke, 1832)
