= 50th meridian west =

Line of longitude

50th meridian west

The meridian 50° west of Greenwich is a line of longitude that extends from the North Pole across the Arctic Ocean, Greenland, the Atlantic Ocean, South America, the Southern Ocean, and Antarctica to the South Pole.

The 50th meridian west forms a great circle with the 130th meridian east.

== From Pole to Pole ==
Starting at the North Pole and heading south to the South Pole, the 50th meridian west passes through:

Co-ordinates	Country, territory or sea	Notes
90°0′N 50°0′W	Arctic Ocean	
83°40′N 50°0′W	Lincoln Sea	
82°48′N 50°0′W	Greenland	Beaumont Island
82°46′N 50°0′W	Lincoln Sea	
82°31′N 50°0′W	Greenland	Wulff Land
82°1′N 50°0′W	Sherard Osborn Fjord	
81°53′N 50°0′W	Greenland	
62°18′N 50°0′W	Atlantic Ocean	
1°42′N 50°0′W	Brazil	Amapá — mainland and the island of Bailique
0°56′N 50°0′W	Atlantic Ocean	Mouth of the Amazon River
0°18′N 50°0′W	Brazil	Pará — islands of Caviana and Marajó, and the mainland Tocantins — from 9°15′S 50°0′W; Goiás — from 13°3′S 50°0′W; Minas Gerais — from 18°36′S 50°0′W; São Paulo — from 19°56′S 50°0′W; Paraná — from 22°55′S 50°0′W; Santa Catarina — from 26°1′S 50°0′W; Rio Grande do Sul — from 28°27′S 50°0′W; Santa Catarina — for about 11 km from 29°8′S 50°0′W; Rio Grande do Sul — from 29°13′S 50°0′W
29°44′S 50°0′W	Atlantic Ocean	
60°0′S 50°0′W	Southern Ocean	
77°12′S 50°0′W	Antarctica	Claimed by both Argentina (Argentine Antarctica) and United Kingdom (British Antarctic Territory)

== See also ==
- 49th meridian west
- 51st meridian west
