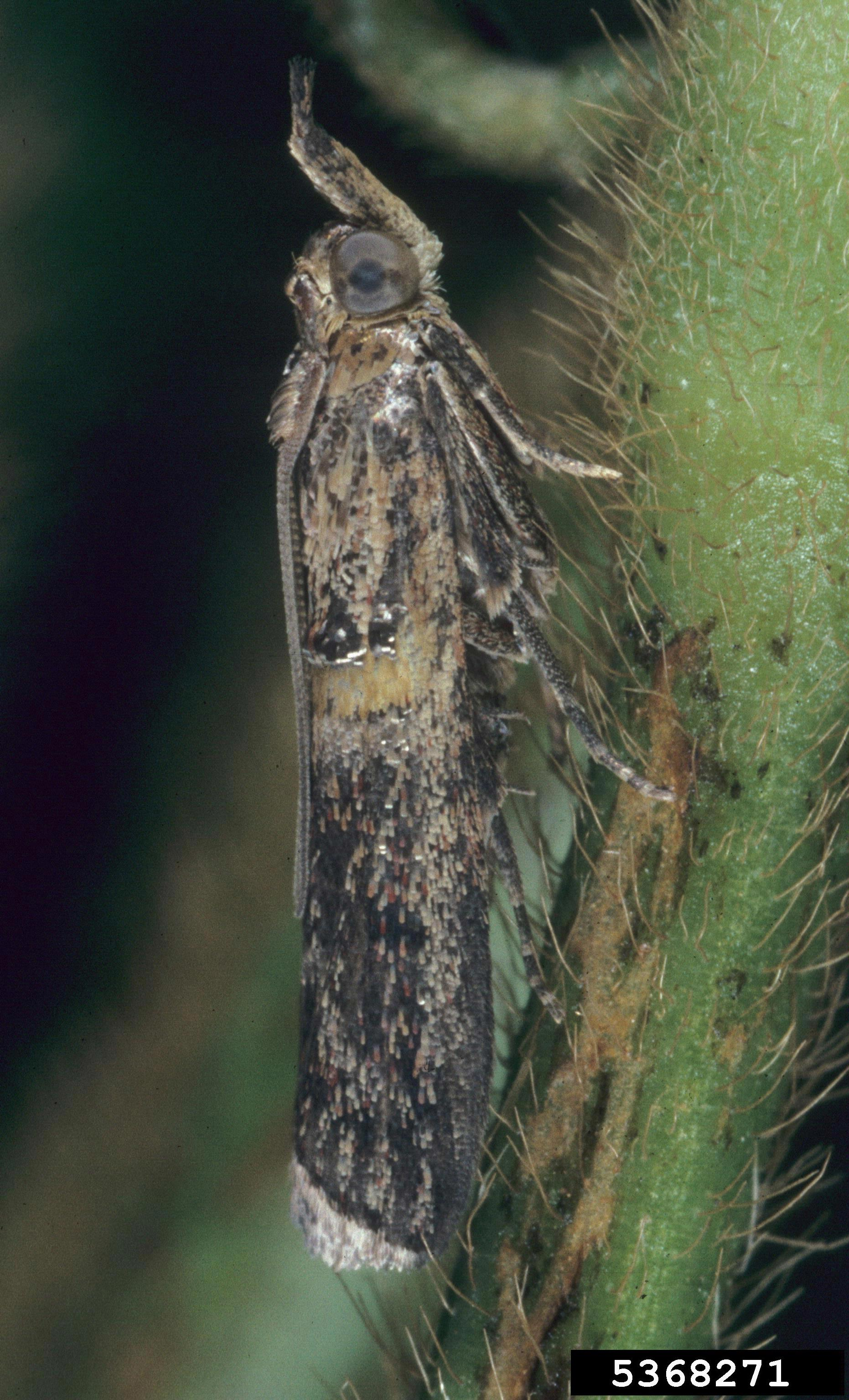

Scientific classification
- Domain: Eukaryota
- Kingdom: Animalia
- Phylum: Arthropoda
- Class: Insecta
- Order: Lepidoptera
- Family: Pyralidae
- Genus: Etiella
- Species: E. hobsoni

Binomial name
- Etiella hobsoni Butler, 1881

Synonyms
- Etiella melanella Hampson & Ragonot 1901

= Etiella hobsoni =

Species of moth

Etiella hobsoni is a species of snout moth in the genus Etiella. It was described by Arthur Gardiner Butler in 1881. It is found in Australia and Indonesia.

The larvae are podborers of soybean.
