= 131st meridian east =

Line of longitude

131st meridian east (interactive map)

The meridian 131° east of Greenwich is a line of longitude that extends from the North Pole across the Arctic Ocean, Asia, Australia, the Indian Ocean, the Southern Ocean, and Antarctica to the South Pole.

The 131st meridian east forms a great circle with the 49th meridian west.

== From Pole to Pole ==
Starting at the North Pole and heading south to the South Pole, the 131st meridian east passes through:

| Co-ordinates | Country, territory or sea | Notes |
|---|---|---|
| 90°0′N 131°0′E | Arctic Ocean | |
| 77°7′N 131°0′E | Laptev Sea | |
| 70°44′N 131°0′E | Russia | Sakha Republic; Khabarovsk Krai — from 56°10′N 131°0′E; Amur Oblast — from 55°42′N 131°0′E; Khabarovsk Krai — from 54°18′N 131°0′E; Amur Oblast — from 53°49′N 131°0′E; Khabarovsk Krai — from 51°10′N 131°0′E; Amur Oblast — from 50°24′N 131°0′E; Jewish Autonomous Oblast — from 48°58′N 131°0′E |
| 47°41′N 131°0′E | China | Heilongjiang |
| 44°52′N 131°0′E | Russia | Primorsky Krai — for about 6 km (3.7 mi) |
| 44°48′N 131°0′E | China | Heilongjiang; Jilin — from 43°29′N 131°0′E |
| 42°51′N 131°0′E | Russia | Primorsky Krai |
| 42°38′N 131°0′E | Sea of Japan | Passing just east of the island of Ulleungdo, South Korea (at 37°30′N 130°55′E); Passing just west of the island of Mishima, Yamaguchi Prefecture, Japan (at 34°47′N 131°7′E) |
| 34°26′N 131°0′E | Japan | Island of Honshū, Yamaguchi Prefecture (passing through Chōfu station in eastern Shimonoseki) |
| 33°59′N 131°0′E | Kanmon Straits | |
| 33°57′N 131°0′E | Japan | Island of Kyūshū — Fukuoka Prefecture — Ōita Prefecture — from 33°31′N 131°0′E — Kumamoto Prefecture — from 33°10′N 131°0′E — Ōita Prefecture — from 33°7′N 131°0′E — Kumamoto Prefecture — from 33°1′N 131°0′E — Miyazaki Prefecture — from 32°9′N 131°0′E — Kagoshima Prefecture — from 31°44′N 131°0′E |
| 31°11′N 131°0′E | East China Sea | |
| 30°44′N 131°0′E | Japan | Island of Tanegashima, Kagoshima Prefecture |
| 30°32′N 131°0′E | Pacific Ocean | Passing just west of the island of Minami Daitō, Okinawa Prefecture, Japan (at 25°50′N 131°12′E); Passing just west of the island of Oki Daitō, Okinawa Prefecture, Japan (at 24°28′N 131°11′E); Passing just west of the island of Tobi, Palau (at 3°0′N 131°7′E); Passing just west of the Asia Islands, Indonesia (at 1°0′N 131°13′E); Passing just west of the Ayu Islands, Indonesia (at 3°23′N 131°1′E) |
| 0°3′S 131°0′E | Indonesia | Island of Waigeo |
| 0°21′S 131°0′E | Dampier Strait | |
| 0°56′S 131°0′E | Indonesia | Islands of Salawati and New Guinea |
| 1°28′S 131°0′E | Ceram Sea | Passing just east of the island of Seram, Indonesia (at 3°35′S 130°52′E) |
| 3°54′S 131°0′E | Banda Sea | |
| 7°26′S 131°0′E | Indonesia | Island of Wuliaru |
| 7°30′S 131°0′E | Banda Sea | |
| 7°40′S 131°0′E | Indonesia | Island of Seira |
| 7°44′S 131°0′E | Banda Sea | |
| 8°6′S 131°0′E | Indonesia | Island of Selaru |
| 8°13′S 131°0′E | Arafura Sea | |
| 9°3′S 131°0′E | Timor Sea | |
| 11°21′S 131°0′E | Australia | Northern Territory — Melville Island |
| 11°54′S 131°0′E | Clarence Strait | |
| 12°10′S 131°0′E | Australia | Northern Territory; South Australia — from 26°0′S 131°0′E |
| 31°33′S 131°0′E | Indian Ocean | Australian authorities consider this to be part of the Southern Ocean |
| 60°0′S 131°0′E | Southern Ocean | |
| 66°6′S 131°0′E | Antarctica | Australian Antarctic Territory, claimed by Australia |

== See also ==
- 130th meridian east
- 132nd meridian east
