= Selaru language =

Austronesian language in Central Maluku

Selaru
- tel Masylarkwe
- Native to: Indonesia
- Region: Tanimbar Islands
- Native speakers: (8,000 cited 2001)
- Language family: Austronesian: Malayo-Polynesian; Central–Eastern; Timor-Babar; Southwest Tanimbar; Selaru

Language codes
- ISO 639-3: slu
- Glottolog: sela1259

Selaru is an Austronesian language of Selaru and Yamdena, in the Maluku Islands of Indonesia. Linguistically it is not close to Seluwasan, its nearest relative.

== Phonology ==
=== Consonants ===
		Labial	Alveolar	Dorsal	Glottal
Plosive	voiceless		t	k	ʔ
Plosive	voiced	b	d	(ɡ)	
Fricative		f	s		h
Nasal		m	n		
Trill			r		
Lateral			l		
Approximant		w		j	

- /h/ can be heard as [x] before velar stops.
- /k/ can be heard as [ɡ] within voiced environments.
- Consonants preceding glide sounds are heard as either palatalized or labialized [ʲ, ʷ].

=== Vowels ===
	Front	Central	Back
Close	i		u
Mid	e		o
Open		a	
