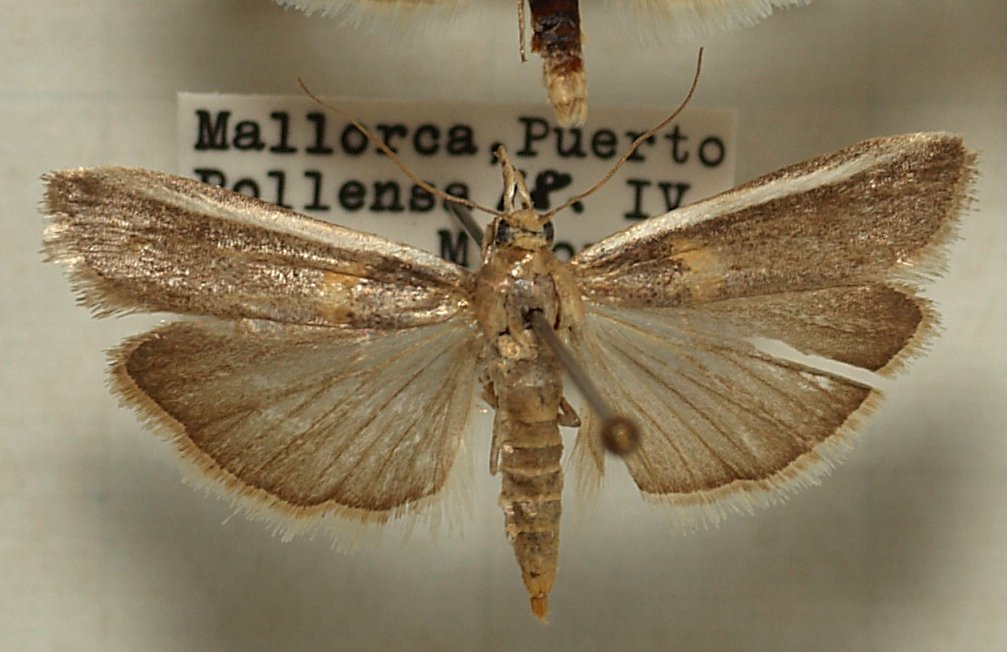

Scientific classification
- Kingdom: Animalia
- Phylum: Arthropoda
- Class: Insecta
- Order: Lepidoptera
- Family: Pyralidae
- Genus: Etiella
- Species: E. zinckenella

Binomial name
- Etiella zinckenella (Treitschke, 1832)

Synonyms
- List: Phycis zinckenella Treitschke, 1832; Tinea marginella Fabricius, 1781 (preocc. Denis & Schiffermüller, 1775); Phycis etiella Treitschke, 1835; Tinea (Chilo) colonnellus Costa, [1836]; Tinea (Chilo) majorellus Costa, [1836]; Mella dymnusalis Walker, 1859; Rhamphodes heraldella Guenée, 1862; Alata anticalis Walker, 1863; Arucha indicatalis Walker, 1863; Alata hastiferella Walker, 1866; Etiella zinckenella ab. decipiens Staudinger, 1870; Pempelia spartiella Rondani, 1876; Crambus sabulinus Butler, 1879; Etiella madagascariensis Saalmüller, 1880; Etiella schisticolor Zeller, 1881; Etiella villosella Hulst, 1887; Etiella rubribasella Hulst, 1890

= Etiella zinckenella =

Species of moth

Etiella zinckenella, the pulse pod borer moth, is a moth of the family Pyralidae. It is found in southern and eastern Europe and in the tropics and subtropics of Africa and Asia. They have also been introduced to North America and Australia. It is usually a minor pest for many legumes, but can be a serious pest.

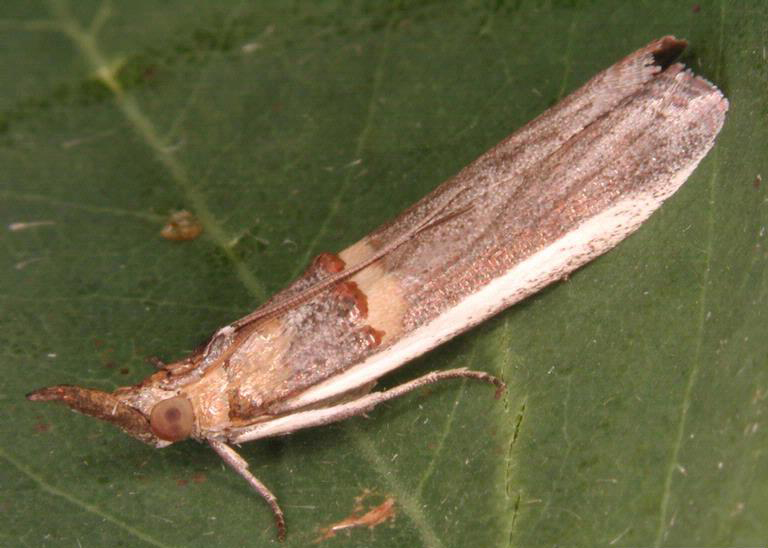

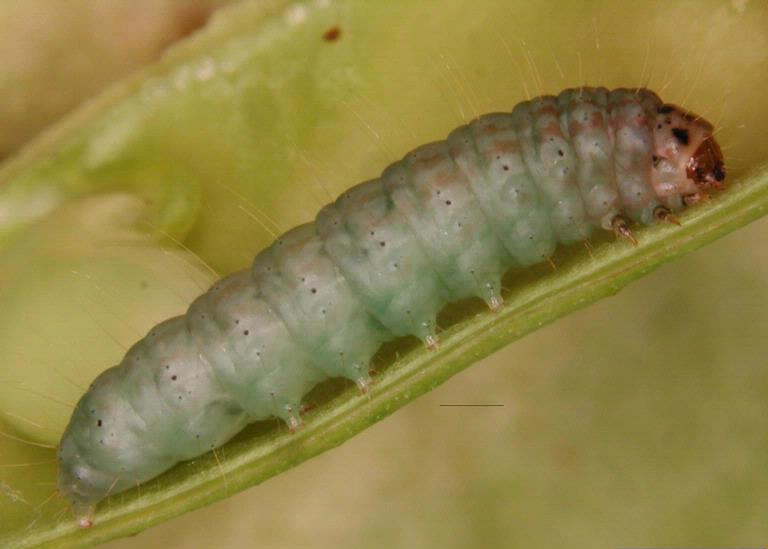
Caterpillar

The wingspan is 22–26 mm.19-27 mm The forewings are yellow brown to brownish grey with a lighter costal stripe and a yellowish and chestnut fascia at one third. Hindwings are pale grey with black venation and a dark double line before the fringe.

== Ecology ==
The caterpillars feed on the mung bean, Phaseolus lunatus and other species of Fabaceae such as pigeonpea, cowpea, lablab, soybean, peas, chickpea, horse gram, green and black grams, Crotalaria juncea, C. micans, C. saltiana, Lathyrus sativus, and Vigna unguiculata. They have also been recorded on Catha edulis (Celastraceae).

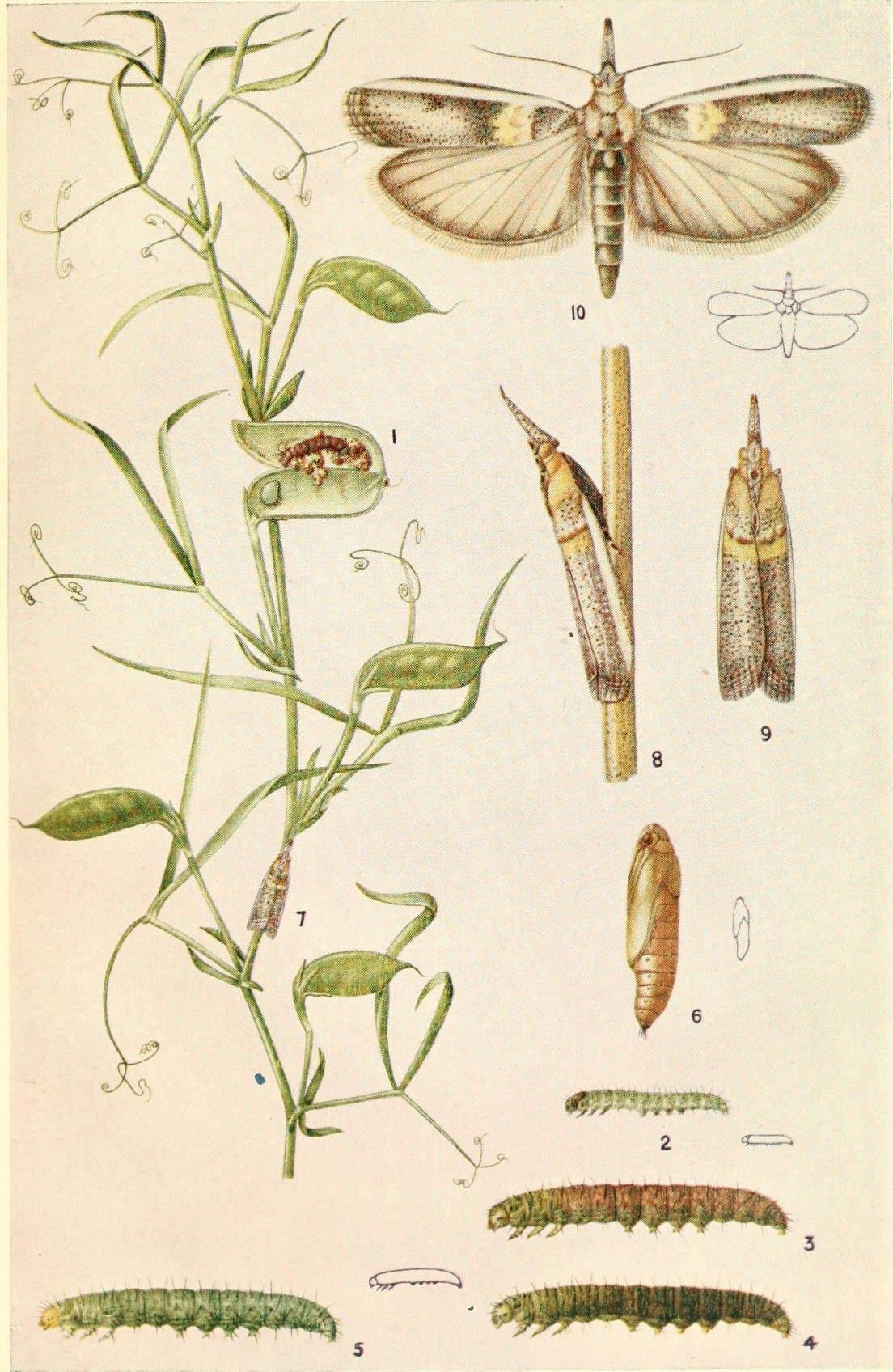
Life history
