= 130th meridian east =

Line of longitude

130th meridian east (interactive map)

The meridian 130° east of Greenwich is a line of longitude that extends from the North Pole across the Arctic Ocean, Asia, Australia, the Indian Ocean, the Southern Ocean, and Antarctica to the South Pole.

The 130th meridian east forms a great ellipse with the 50th meridian west.

== From Pole to Pole ==
Starting at the North Pole and heading south to the South Pole, the 130th meridian east passes through:

| Co-ordinates | Country, territory or sea | Notes |
|---|---|---|
| 90°0′N 130°0′E | Arctic Ocean | |
| 77°14′N 130°0′E | Laptev Sea | |
| 71°5′N 130°0′E | Russia | Sakha Republic; Amur Oblast — from 55°44′N 130°0′E |
| 49°0′N 130°0′E | China | Heilongjiang; Jilin — from 43°51′N 130°0′E |
| 42°58′N 130°0′E | North Korea | |
| 42°0′N 130°0′E | Sea of Japan | |
| 33°27′N 130°0′E | Japan | Island of Kyūshū — Saga Prefecture — Nagasaki Prefecture — from 33°2′N 130°0′E |
| 32°45′N 130°0′E | East China Sea | |
| 32°23′N 130°0′E | Japan | Island of Shimoshima — Kumamoto Prefecture |
| 32°14′N 130°0′E | East China Sea | Passing just east of the Koshikijima Islands, Kagoshima Prefecture, Japan (at 31°49′N 129°56′E); Passing just east of the island of Kuroshima, Kagoshima Prefecture, Japan (at 31°49′N 129°57′E); Passing just west of the island of Kuchinoerabujima, Kagoshima Prefecture, Japan (at 30°28′N 130°8′E) |
| 30°0′N 130°0′E | Pacific Ocean | Passing just east of the island of Kuchinoshima, Kagoshima Prefecture, Japan (at 29°57′N 129°56′E) |
| 28°21′N 130°0′E | Japan | Island of Kikai — Kagoshima Prefecture |
| 28°18′N 130°0′E | Pacific Ocean | |
| 0°14′N 130°0′E | Halmahera Sea | Passing by numerous small islands of Indonesia |
| 1°45′S 130°0′E | Indonesia | Island of Misool |
| 2°1′S 130°0′E | Ceram Sea | |
| 2°59′S 130°0′E | Indonesia | Island of Seram |
| 3°29′S 130°0′E | Banda Sea | Passing through the Banda Islands (at 4°33′S 130°0′E) |
| 6°18′S 130°0′E | Indonesia | Island of Serua, Indonesia |
| 6°19′S 130°0′E | Banda Sea | |
| 7°42′S 130°0′E | Indonesia | Island of Dawera |
| 7°44′S 130°0′E | Timor Sea | Passing just west of Bathurst Island, Northern Territory, Australia (at 11°47′S 130°1′E) |
| 13°31′S 130°0′E | Australia | Northern Territory; South Australia — from 26°0′S 130°0′E |
| 31°35′S 130°0′E | Indian Ocean | Australian authorities consider this to be part of the Southern Ocean |
| 60°0′S 130°0′E | Southern Ocean | |
| 65°59′S 130°0′E | Antarctica | Australian Antarctic Territory, claimed by Australia |

== See also ==
- 129th meridian east
- 131st meridian east
