= Etiella scitivittalis =

Scientific classification
- Kingdom: Animalia
- Phylum: Arthropoda
- Class: Insecta
- Order: Lepidoptera
- Family: Pyralidae
- Genus: Etiella
- Species: E. scitivittalis

Binomial name
- Etiella scitivittalis (Walker, 1863)

Synonyms
- Modiana scitivittalis Walker, 1863; Etiella sincerella Meyrick, 1879

Species of moth

Etiella scitivittalis is a species of snout moth in the genus Etiella. It was described by Francis Walker in 1863. It is found in Australia (Queensland and New South Wales).
