= 49th meridian west =

Line of longitude

49th meridian west

The meridian 49° west of Greenwich is a line of longitude that extends from the North Pole across the Arctic Ocean, Greenland, the Atlantic Ocean, South America, the Southern Ocean, and Antarctica to the South Pole.

The 49th meridian west forms a great circle with the 131st meridian east.

== From Pole to Pole ==
Starting at the North Pole and heading south to the South Pole, the 49th meridian west passes through:

- DD Coordinates: 90.0 -49.0
- DMS Coordinates: 90°00'0.00" N -49°00'0.00" W
- Geohash Coordinates: fzvpu
- UTM Coordinates: 22Z 500000 9997964.9432367

Co-ordinates	Country, territory or sea	Notes
90°0′N 49°0′W	Arctic Ocean	
83°40′N 49°0′W	Lincoln Sea	
82°26′N 49°0′W	Greenland	Wulff Land
61°24′N 49°0′W	Atlantic Ocean	
0°8′S 49°0′W	Brazil	Pará — Marajó island and the mainland Tocantins — from 6°46′S 49°0′W; Goiás — from 12°45′S 49°0′W; Minas Gerais — from 18°21′S 49°0′W; São Paulo — from 20°9′S 49°0′W; Paraná — from 24°40′S 49°0′W; Santa Catarina — from 26°1′S 49°0′W
28°41′S 49°0′W	Atlantic Ocean	
60°0′S 49°0′W	Southern Ocean	
77°20′S 49°0′W	Antarctica	Claimed by both Argentina (Argentine Antarctica) and United Kingdom (British Antarctic Territory)

== See also ==
- 48th meridian west
- 50th meridian west
- 51st meridian west
- 52nd meridian west
