= Fordata language =

Austronesian language spoken in Maluku, Indonesia

Fordata
- Vaidida
- Native to: Indonesia
- Region: Tanimbar Islands
- Native speakers: (50,000 cited 2000)
- Language family: Austronesian: Malayo-Polynesian; Central–Eastern; Kei–Tanimbar; Kei–Fordata; Fordata

Language codes
- ISO 639-3: frd
- Glottolog: ford1242

Fordata (Vai Fordata, Vai Tnebar) is an Austronesian language spoken in the Tanimbar Islands of the Moluccas. It is closely related to Kei, and more distantly to Yamdena, both also spoken in the Tanimbar Islands.

== Phonology ==
=== Consonants ===
		Labial	Dental/ Alveolar	Palatal	Velar	Glottal
Nasal		m	n		ŋ ⟨ng⟩	
Plosive	voiceless		t̪		k	ʔ ⟨'⟩
Plosive	voiced	b	d			
Fricative	voiceless	f	s			h
Fricative	voiced	v				
Lateral			l			
Trill			r			
Semivowel		w		j ⟨y⟩		

- Glottal sounds /h ʔ/ only occur intervocalically.
- /v/ can often be heard as [w] among younger speakers.
- /r/ can also be heard in free variation with a flap sound [ɾ].

=== Vowels ===
	Front	Central	Back
Close	i		u
Mid	e		o
Open		a	

- Sounds /i e/ have lax sounds of [ɪ ɛ]
- /a/ can have an allophone of [ə] when before a consonant, or in word-final position.
