= Yamdena language =

Austronesian language in Indonesia

Yamdena
- Native to: Indonesia
- Region: Maluku Islands
- Native speakers: 69,000 (2023)
- Language family: Austronesian: Malayo-Polynesian (MP); Central–Eastern MP; Kei–Tanimbar; Yamdena–North Bomberai; Yamdena

Language codes
- ISO 639-3: jmd
- Glottolog: yamd1240

Yamdena is an Austronesian language of Yamdena and surrounding islands in the Maluku Islands in Indonesia. In 1991, there were an estimated 25,000 speakers of the language. Current BPS data has the present number of speakers at 69,000.

== Phonology ==
=== Consonants ===
		Labial	Alveolar	Palatal	Velar
Plosive	voiceless	p	t		k
Plosive	voiced	b	d		
Plosive	prenasalized	ᵐp	ⁿd		
Fricative		f	s		
Nasal		m	n		ŋ
Rhotic			r		
Lateral			l		
Approximant		w		j	

- Stops /b, t/ can very rarely be realized as coarticulated sounds [ɡ͡b, k͡t] by some speakers.
- /m/ can be heard as voiceless [m̥] in free variation when before initial voiceless stops, or after voiceless stops.
- /ŋ/ is heard as labialized [ŋʷ] when occurring before liquids, or in word-final position.
- /r/ can be heard as [ɺ] in free variation intervocalically, and as [ɾ] when before voiceless consonants.
- /d, ⁿd/ when occurring before /i/ can also be heard as palatal stops [ɟ, ᶮɟ].

=== Vowels ===
	Front	Central	Back
Close	i		u
Mid	e		o
Open		a	

- Vowels /a, o/ can be heard as [ə] within unstressed syllables.
- /i/ can be heard as [ɪ] word-finally, after vowels.
- /o/ can be heard as [ɔ] when before /r/.
