= Selaru =

Island in Indonesia

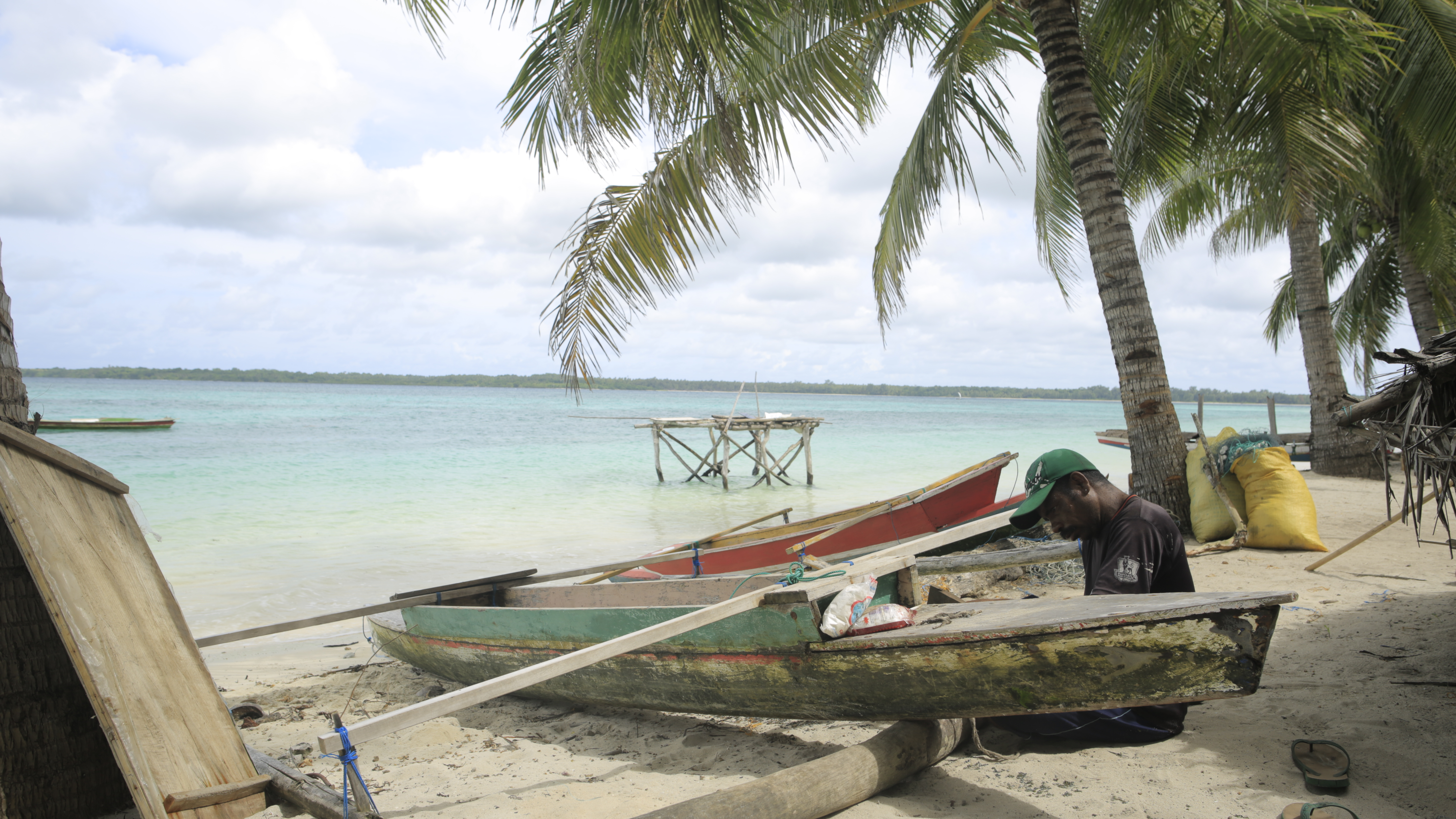
Beach at Selaru

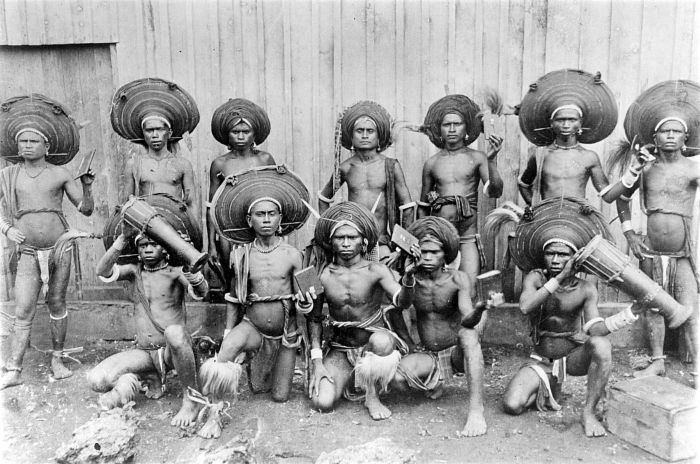
A group of young men at Adaut in Selaru, Tanimbar Islands, probably in the early 20th century.

Selaru is an island in Indonesia in the Tanimbar Islands group, Southeast Maluku. It is located south of Yamdena. It is one of the 92 officially listed outlying islands of Indonesia.

== See also ==
- Selaru language
- Tanimbar Islands
