= Yamdena =

Indonesian island

- Location within Maluku

Geography
- Location: South East Asia
- Coordinates: 7°36′S 131°25′E
- Archipelago: Tanimbar Islands
- Area: 2,981 km^{2} (1,151 sq mi)

Administration
- Indonesia
- Province: Maluku
- Largest settlement: Saumlaki

Yamdena (spelled Jamdena during the Dutch colonial period) is the largest of the Tanimbar Islands in the Maluku province of Indonesia. Saumlaki is the chief town, located on the south end of the island.

The island has a range of forested hills along its eastern coast, while its western coast is lower. The forests are inhabited by wild water buffalo.

The Yamdena language is spoken on and around the island. Christianity is the main religion, but ancestor worship is still practised. Handicrafts on the island include woodcarving, fine goldwork, and Ikat weaving (mainly on nearby Selaru Island). In 1987 a new species of Bush Warbler was recorded on the island.

Megalith: In the village of Sangliat Dol there is an antique stone stairway that leads from the beach to a boat shaped stone platform. There are several similar less preserved sites on the island, which originally represented the boats on which the inhabitants' ancient ancestors arrived on the island.

== Transport ==
Saumlaki is linked by air and sea to Langgur-Tual in the Kei Islands.

== Gallery ==
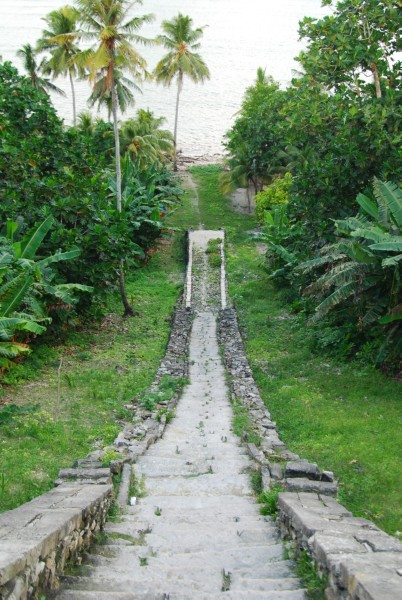
Stone staircase leading from the beach in the village of Songliat Dol, East Yamdena

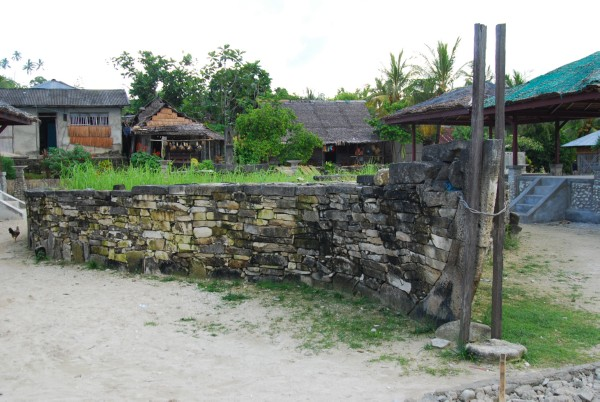
Stone boat used for ancestor worship ceremonies in Songliat Dol, East Yamdena

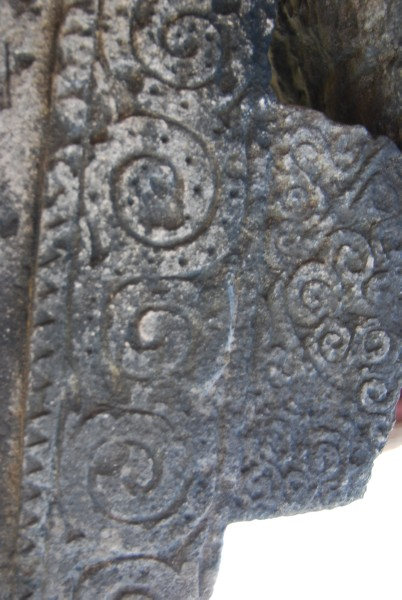
Motifs on the stone boat of Sangliat Dol, East Yamdena

Kristus Raja Christ statue at Weluan, reflecting the region's strong Christian faith

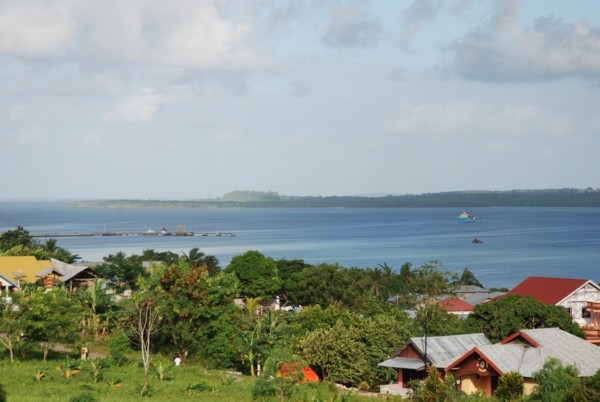
Saumlaki Harbour, the principal port for Yamdena and the Tanimbar Islands
