= Tanimbar Islands =

Group of islands in Maluku, Indonesia

Coordinates: 7.500°S 131.500°E

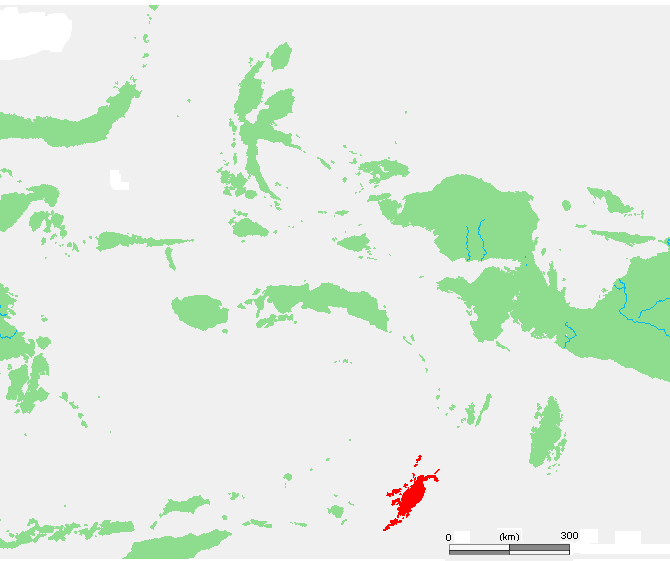
Tanimbar Islands in the south of Maluku Islands

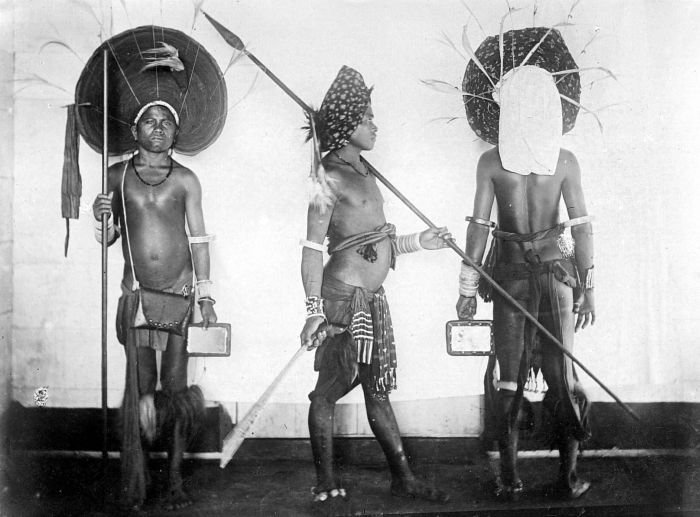
Tanimbar warriors.

The Tanimbar Islands (Indonesian: Kepulauan Tanimbar; Indonesian pronunciation: [kəpuˌlawan̪ t̪aˈnimbar]), also called Timur Laut (literally, "North East"; Indonesian pronunciation: [ˌt̪imʊr ˈlaʊt̪̚]), are a group of about 65 islands in the Maluku province of Indonesia. The largest and most central of the islands is Yamdena; others include Selaru to the southwest of Yamdena, Larat and Fordata to the northeast, Maru and Molu to the north, and Seira, Wuliaru, Selu, Wotap and Makasar to the west. The Indonesian phrase timur laut means "east of the sea" or "northeast".

The Tanimbar Islands are administered as the Tanimbar Islands Regency (Indonesian: Kabupaten Kepulauan Tanimbar), a regency of Maluku. The Regency covers a land area of 10,166.82 km^{2}, and it had a population of 105,341 at the 2010 census, rising to 123,572 at the 2020 census; the official estimate as at mid 2024 was 132,337. The principal town and administrative centre lies at Saumlaki which (with the suburban North Saumlaki (Saumlaki Utara) and the villages of Olilit and Sifnana) occupies a peninsula in the southeast of Yamdena Island.

== Geography ==
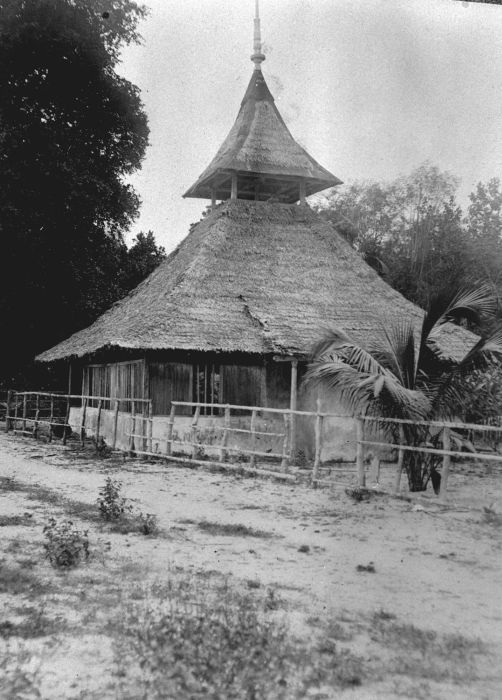
A building in Tanimbar

Geographically, the northeast islands are still part of the Lesser Sunda Islands. The Aru Islands and Kai Islands lie to the northeast, and Babar Island and Timor lie to the west. The islands separate the Banda Sea and the Arafura Sea. The total land area of the Islands is 10,166.82 km^{2} (3,900.76 sq mi).

The largest of the group is Yamdena. Yamdena Island has a range of thickly forested hills along its eastern coast, while its western coast is lower. Saumlaki is the chief town, located on the southeast peninsula of Yamdena. Other islands include Larat, Selaru, and Wuliaru.

The population was 123,572 at the 2020 census, of whom about 94% are Christian, and the remainder Muslim or other. The official estimate as at mid 2024 was 132,337.

The tiny island of Tanimbarkei is not part of Tanimbar, but of the Kai Islands and inhabited by less than 1,000 very traditional people.

The Tanimbar Islands are part of the Banda Sea Islands moist deciduous forests ecoregion.

== History ==
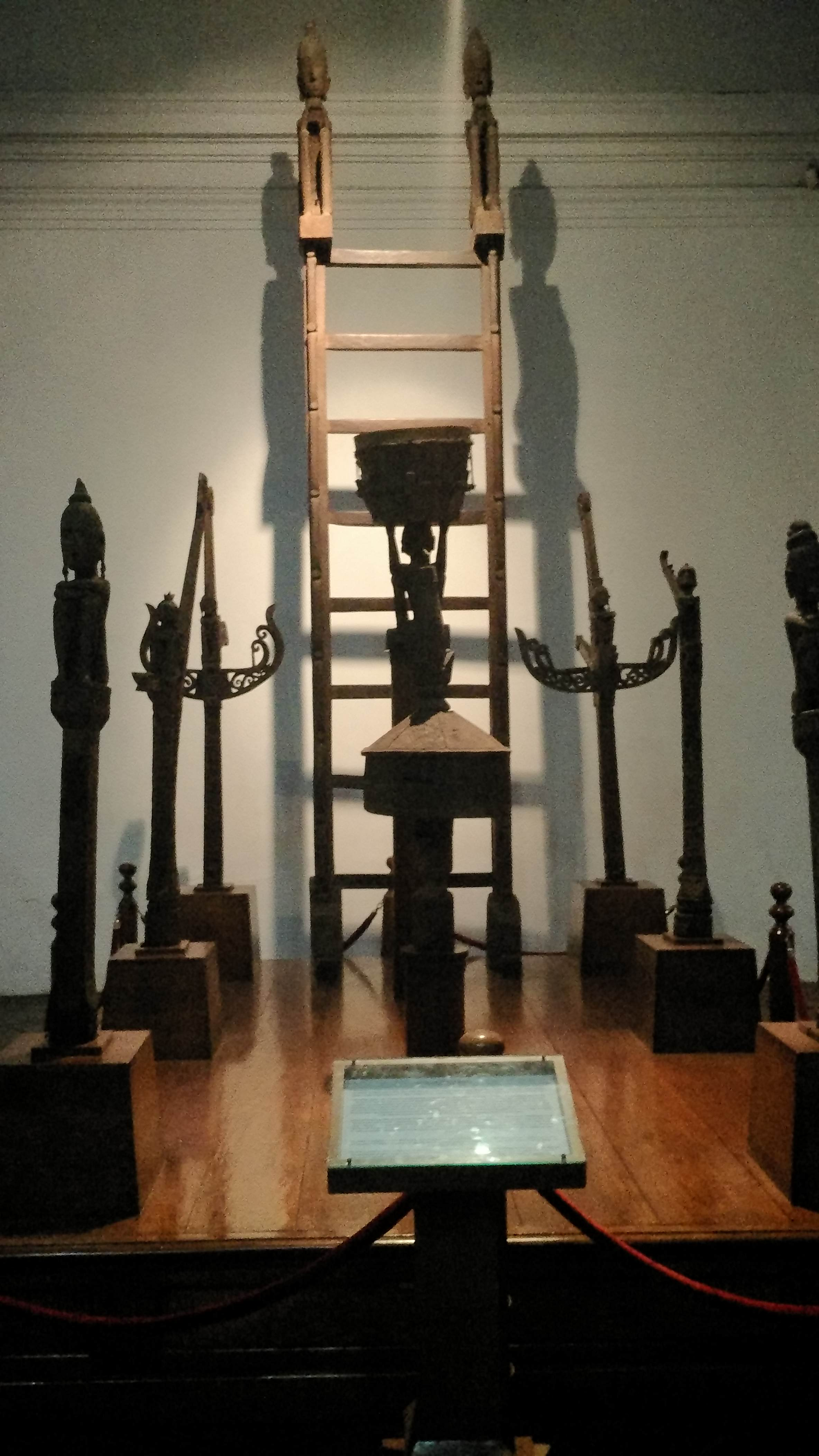
The ancestor statue from Tanimbar Islands, Western Southeast Maluku Regency

In modern history, the Tanimbar islands (as the Aru Islands) were mentioned in the 16th century maps of Lázaro Luís (1563), Bartolomeu Velho (c. 1560), Sebastião Lopes (1565), in the 1594 map of the East Indies entitled Insulæ Moluccæ by the Dutch cartographer Petrus Plancius, and in the map of Nova Guinea of 1600 (based on Portuguese sources). The Tanimbar Islands were sighted and possibly visited by Portuguese navigators such as Martim Afonso de Melo Jusarte around 1522–1525, who traveled around the archipelagos of Aru (with the reference "Here wintered Martin Afonso de Melo") and Tanimbar, and possibly Gomes de Sequeira in 1526.

The Tanimbar Islands were part of the Dutch East Indies. During World War II the Dutch sent a detachment of 13 soldiers led by KNIL sergeant Julius Tahija to the town of Saumlaki in the Tanimbar Islands in July 1942. Japanese ships entered the bay at Saumlaki on 30 July and small boats were used to get to the jetty. The Japanese filed in ranks on the jetty and wanted to march in close order into Saumlaki. The garrison opened fire at close range with their two light machine guns. The Japanese retreated to their boats leaving several dead on the jetty. Subsequent enemy landings, however, were made elsewhere while the Japanese ships opened fire on the defenders’ position. Six of the Dutch soldiers were killed and the seven survivors were driven into the bush. On 31 July, a vessel carrying an Australian Army contingent arrived at the jetty at Saumlaki, unaware that the town had fallen to the Japanese. The vessel was fired on from the shore, and the commander of the landing party was killed. The Australians retreated to Darwin. Afterwards, the members of the Dutch garrison came under naval gunfire from the Japanese; this inflicted some casualties, and was followed by attacks by Japanese infantry on a wider front. The seven surviving members of the garrison then boarded a sailing ship and escaped to Australia.

== Economy ==
Important products are copra, tortoiseshell, and trepang (an edible sea cucumber). Recently, the Japanese oil and gas corporation Inpex intended to develop the Masela Block Project with billions of tonnes of natural gas produced. Offshore facilities will be located on the Tanimbar Island.

== Fauna ==
- Bastilla missionarii
- Etiella chrysoporella
- Troides riedeli
- Blue-streaked lory
- Fawn-breasted thrush
- Tanimbar bush-warbler
- Tanimbar corella
- Tanimbar eclectus
- Tanimbar megapode
- Tanimbar starling
- Moluccan masked owl
- Samlakki tree frog
- Cylindrophis yamdena
- Oligodon unicolor
- Simalia nauta
- Tiliqua scincoides
- Varanus tanimbar

== See also ==
- List of islands of Indonesia
- Kei-Tanimbar languages
